= Dubník (nature reserve) =

National nature reserve in Slovakia

- IUCN category IV (habitat/species management area)
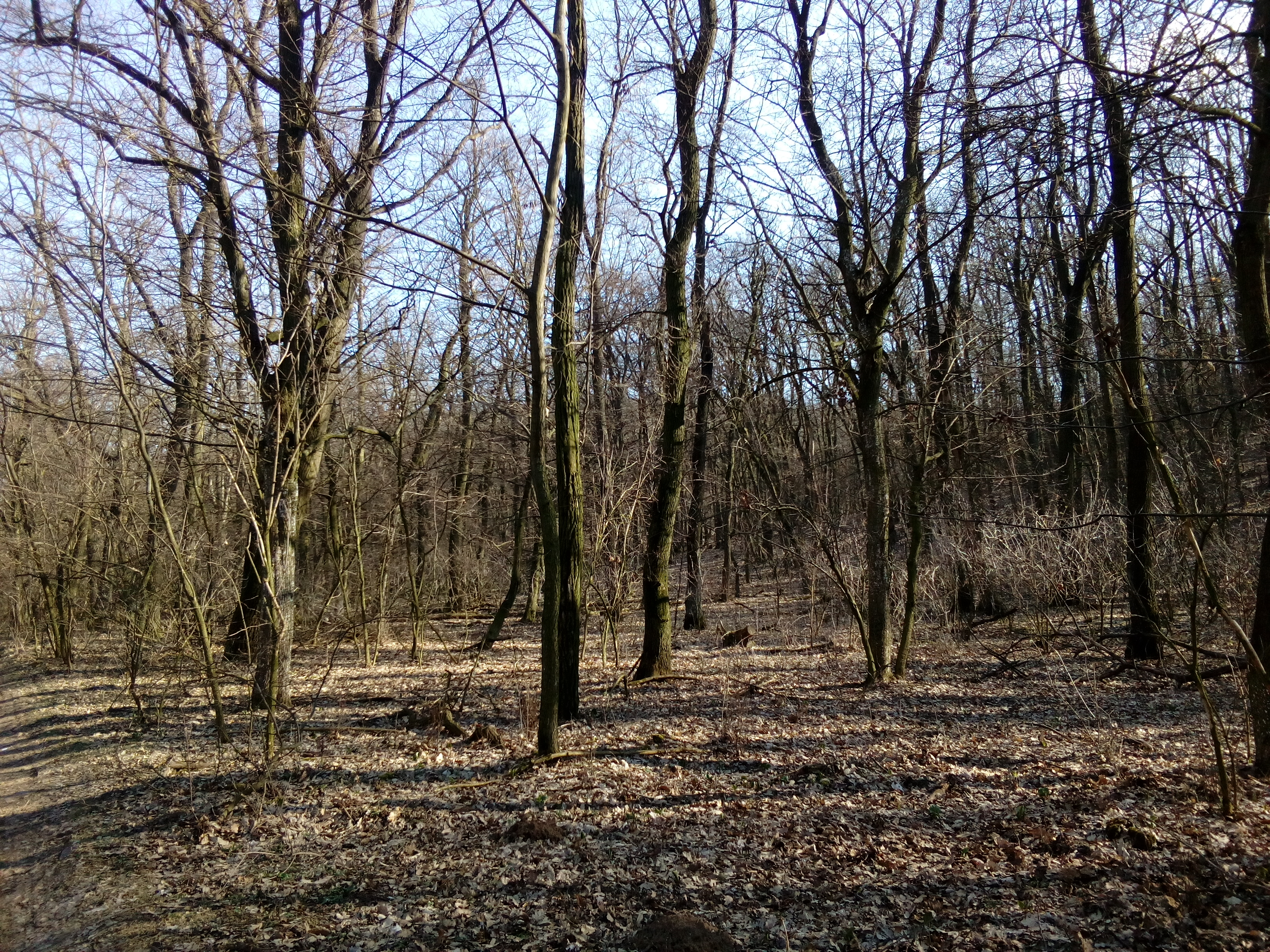
- Interactive map of Dubník
- Coordinates: 48.320°N 17.785°E
- Area: 1.651 km²
- Established: 1954
- Governing body: ŠOP - S-CHKO Dunajské luhy

Dubník is a national nature reserve in the Slovak municipalities of Dvorníky, Pusté Sady, Vinohrady nad Váhom in the Hlohovec District and Galanta District. The nature reserve covers an area of 165 ha in the Váh river valley. It has a protection level of 4 under the Slovak nature protection system. The protected area is an important bird locality especially for Eurasian scops owl. It is a rare remainder of natural forest with protected species in a deforested landscape. The geological substrate is loess and the soil type is black earth. On the edge of the protected landscape is a stand of old oaks which forms an important bird nesting place.

== Fauna ==
Some animals present in the nature reserve are Sand lizard, Eurasian scops owl, Hazel dormouse and Agile frog.
