= Čierna voda =

River in Slovakia

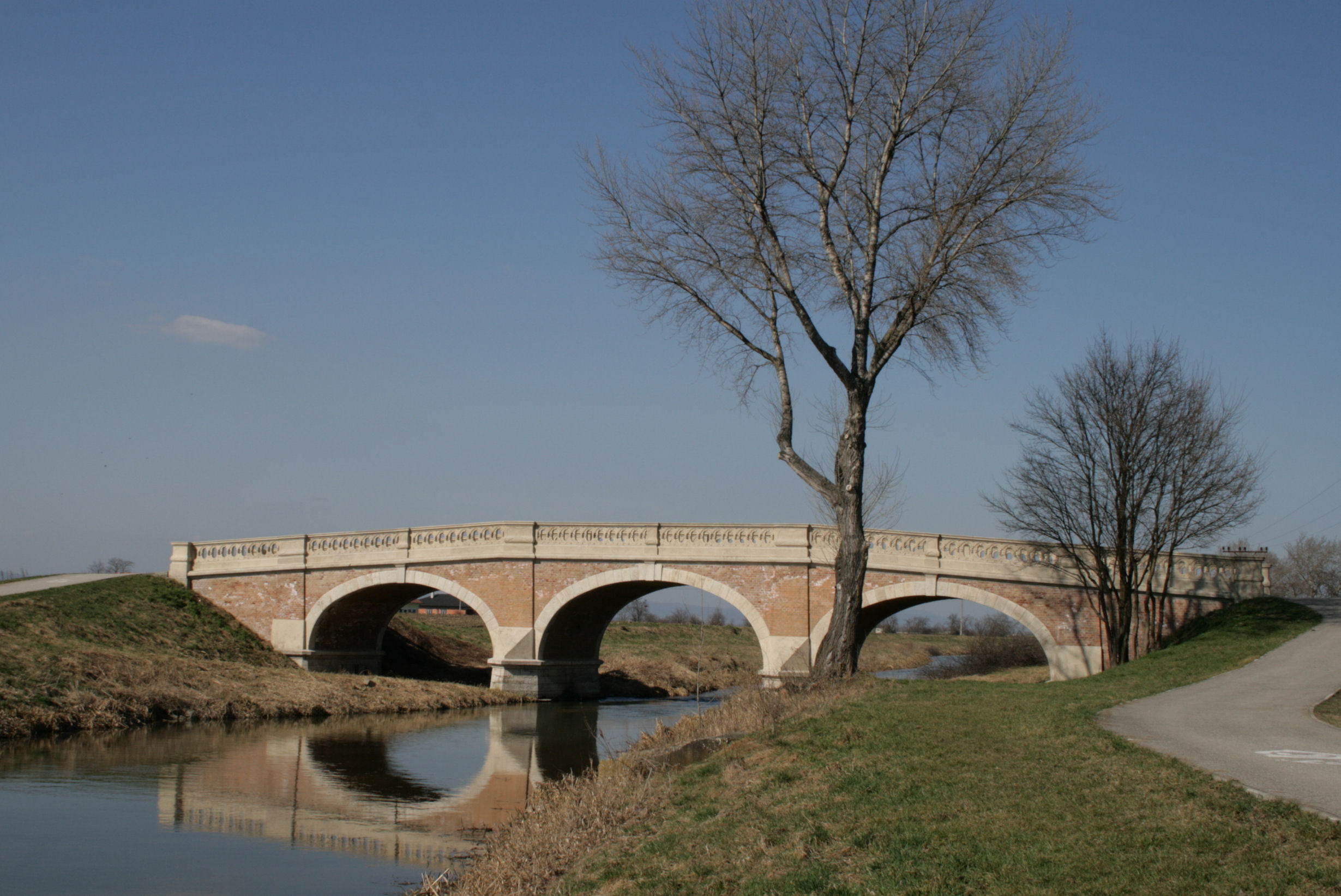
- Bridge near Kráľová pri Senci

Physical characteristics
- Source
  - location: Little Carpathians
- Mouth
  - location: Little Danube
  - coordinates: 47.9593°N 17.8779°E
- Length: 105.5 km (65.6 mi)

Basin features
- Progression: Little Danube→ Váh→ Danube→ Black Sea
- Tributaries
  - left: Dudváh

The Čierna voda is a lowland river in western Slovakia. It is 105.5 km long. Its source is in the Little Carpathians, near the town Svätý Jur. Near the town Čierna Voda, it is joined by its largest tributary: the Dudváh. It discharges into the Little Danube river near the village Dolný Chotár.
