= Janovce =

Janovce may refer to several places in Slovakia:

- Janovce, a village in Bardejov District
- Jánovce, a village in Galanta District
- Jánovce, a village in Poprad District
