= Peter Petráš =

Slovak soccer player

Personal information
- Date of birth: 7 May 1979 (age 47)
- Place of birth: Vinohrady nad Váhom, Czechoslovakia
- Height: 1.82 m (6 ft 0 in)
- Position: Fullback

Team information
- Current team: Prešov (player-manager)

Youth career
- Vinohrady nad Váhom
- VTJ Borský Mikuláš
- Senica

Senior career*
Years	Team	Apps	(Gls)
1999–2001	Dubnica	0	(0)
2001–2005	Inter Bratislava	106	(3)
2005	Petržalka	16	(0)
2006–2008	Saturn Ramenskoe	54	(0)
2009	Slovan Bratislava	24	(1)
2010	Levski Sofia	12	(2)
2010–2014	Prešov	108	(4)
2014	Sereď	18	(0)
2014–2015	Nitra	32	(1)
2016	Inter Bratislava		
2016	Petržalka	?	(9)
2017–2018	Inter Bratislava	30	(3)
2018	Petržalka	15	(3)
2019–2021	Prešov	15	(3)

International career
2006–2010	Slovakia	9	(0)

Managerial career
- 2017: Inter Bratislava (player-assistant)
- 2019: FC Jelka (player-manager)
- 2019–2021: Tatran Prešov (player-manager)
- 2021–2022: FC Jelka (player-manager)
- 2022–: FK Bestrent Horná Krupá
- * Club domestic league appearances and goals

Peter Petráš (born 7 May 1979) is a Slovak football manager and a former defender.

== Club career ==
=== Slovak teams ===
Peter Petráš played for three different teams in Slovakia between 1999 and 2006. Peter capped 120 times in this period, scoring 3 goals.

=== FC Saturn ===
In January 2006 Petráš joined Saturn Ramenskoe in Russia, where he played 54 matches in 3 years.

=== ŠK Slovan Bratislava ===
After three years in Saturn, Petráš joined ŠK Slovan Bratislava in January 2009. He spent a year there and played 24 times, scoring 2 goals.

=== PFC Levski Sofia ===
On 25 February 2010, Petráš signed 6-months contract with PFC Levski Sofia. Peter chose kit number 21. Peter made his official debut for Levski on 7 March 2010 against Minyor Pernik. The result of the match was 3:1 for Levski. Petráš played very well during the match. On 14 March 2010, he was sent off for a second booking in the away match against Litex Lovech.

In 2009/2010 season, after couple of bad games and results, Levski however achieved qualifying for UEFA Europa League becoming 3rd in the final ranking.

His contract with Levski expired in June 2010 and was not renewed.

== International career ==
Petráš has been playing for Slovakia national football team since 2006 He has already made 9 appearances for the side.

== Coaching career ==
In the summer 2019, Petráš was appointed player-manager of Prešov.

== Club career statistics ==
This statistic includes domestic league, domestic cup and European tournaments.

Season	Team	Country	Division	Apps	Goals
1999-00	MFK Dubnica	Slovakia	1	0	0
2000–01	MFK Dubnica	Slovakia	1	0	0
2000–01	FK Inter Bratislava	Slovakia	1	14
2001–02	FK Inter Bratislava	Slovakia	1	26	1
2002–03	FK Inter Bratislava	Slovakia	1	10	0
2003–04	FK Inter Bratislava	Slovakia	1	21	0
2004–05	FK Inter Bratislava	Slovakia	1	30	1
2005–06	FK Inter Bratislava	Slovakia	1	3	1
2005–06	Artmedia Petržalka	Slovakia	1	16	1
2006	Saturn Ramenskoe	Russia	1	28	0
2007	Saturn Ramenskoe	Russia	1	23	0
2008	Saturn Ramenskoe	Russia	1	2	0
2008–09	ŠK Slovan Bratislava	Slovakia	1	11	1
2009–10	ŠK Slovan Bratislava	Slovakia	1	13	1
2009–10	PFC Levski Sofia	Bulgaria	1	10	2
2010–11	1.FC Tatran Prešov	Slovakia	1	25	0
2011–12	1.FC Tatran Prešov	Slovakia	1	26	1
2012–13	1.FC Tatran Prešov	Slovakia	1	30	2

Last update: 7 June 2013

== Awards ==
- (Slovakia) Slovak Superliga 2009
