= Vozokany =

Vozokany may refer to:

- Vozokany, Galanta District
- Vozokany, Topoľčany District
