= Sládkovičovo =

Sládkovičovo Diószeg
- Municipality
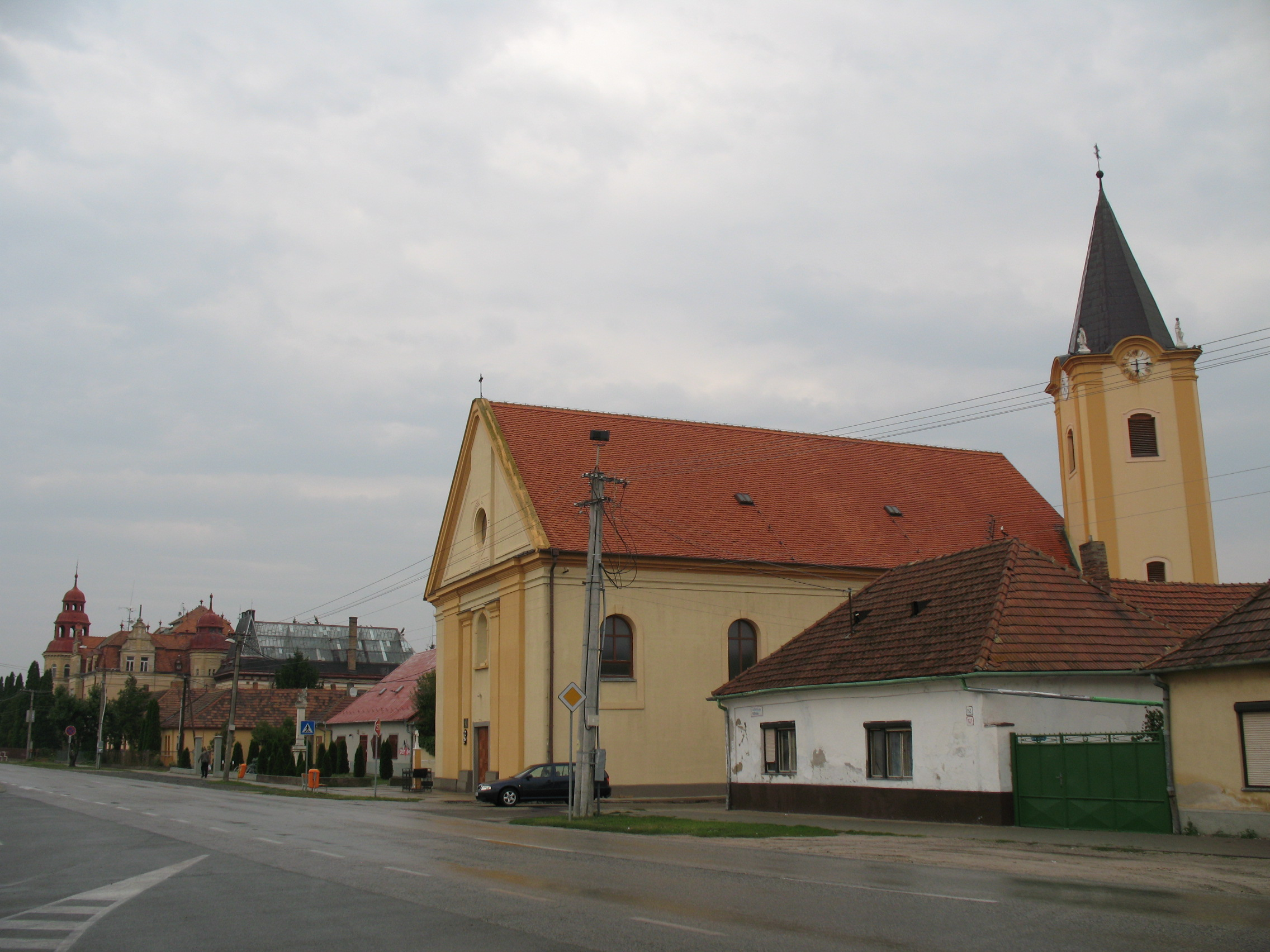

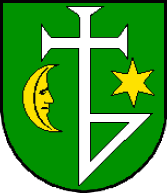
- Flag Coat of arms

- Location of Sládkovičovo in the Trnava Region Location of Sládkovičovo in Slovakia
- Coordinates: 48.21°N 17.64°E
- Country: Slovakia
- Region: Trnava Region
- District: Galanta District
- First mentioned: 1326

Government
  - Mayor: Gábor Krommer

Area
  - Total: 37.07 km^{2} (14.31 sq mi)
- Elevation: 120 m (390 ft)

Population (2025)
  - Total: 5,365
- Time zone: UTC+1 (CET)
  - Summer (DST): UTC+2 (CEST)
- Postal code: 925 21
- Area code: +421 31
- Vehicle registration plate (until 2022): GA
- Website: www.sladkovicovo.sk

Sládkovičovo (until 1948 Diosek, German: Diosek, Hungarian: Diószeg) is a town in the Galanta District, Trnava Region in southwestern Slovakia.

== Geography ==
The municipality lies at an altitude of 120 metres (390 ft) and covers an area of 37.07 km^{2} (14.31 sq mi) (2025).

It is located on the Danubian Lowland, in the region known as Dolné Považie (Lower Váh region) on the Dudváh river, around 45 km east of Slovak capital Bratislava and 8 km from district seat Galanta.

== History ==
The first written record about the town was in 1252 in a document of King Béla II of Hungary, possibly named after a forest with walnut trees. In 1530 it was raided by the Ottomans. It received town privileges in 1582 and in the 17th century a royal way was passing through the town, but in 1709 the town burned down. Throughout time, the Church, later Erdődys, Esterházys and in the 19th century Zichys owned the town. During the reign of Joseph II, German farmers and craftsmen settled in the village and two separate villages were created - smaller German Diószeg and larger Hungarian Diószeg. In 1850 a railway track from Pressburg to Budapest was built and the town gained a railway station and in 1867 a sugar factory was built. Later in 1870 the settlement got renewed town privileges. Before the establishment of independent Czechoslovakia in 1918, the town was part of Pozsony County within the Kingdom of Hungary. After the break-up of Austria-Hungary in 1918, the town passed into Czechoslovakia, confirmed by the Treaty of Trianon in 1920. As a result of the First Vienna Award the town belonged from 1938 to 1945 to Hungary. In 1948 the town was renamed from Diosek to Sládkovičovo in the honor of Andrej Sládkovič, a Slovak poet.

== Population ==
Population statistic (10 years)
Year	1995	2005	2015	2025
Count	5990	5677	5309	5365
Difference		−5.22%	−6.48%	+1.05%

Population statistic
Year	2024	2025
Count	5386	5365
Difference		−0.38%

It has a population of 5365 people (31 December 2025).

=== Ethnicity ===
Census 2021 (1+ %)
Ethnicity	Number	Fraction
Slovak	3930	72.57%
Hungarian	1475	27.23%
Not found out	134	2.47%
Total	5415	

In year 2021 was 5415 people by ethnicity 3930 as Slovak, 1475 as Hungarian, 134 as Not found out, 45 as Romani, 31 as Czech, 18 as Other, 14 as German, 8 as Vietnamese, 8 as Romanian, 7 as Rusyn, 6 as English, 5 as Italian, 5 as Russian, 3 as Ukrainian, 2 as Jewish, 2 as Korean, 2 as Greek, 2 as Croatian, 1 as Austrian and 1 as Polish.

Note on population: The difference values of population numbers in the table "Population statistic" and in the sections "Ethnicity" & "Religion" is caused by the use of various statistical methods.

=== Religion ===
Census 2021 (1+ %)
Religion	Number	Fraction
Roman Catholic Church	2481	45.82%
None	2108	38.93%
Evangelical Church	308	5.69%
Not found out	269	4.97%
Total	5415	

In year 2021 was 5415 people by religion 2481 from Roman Catholic Church, 2108 from None, 308 from Evangelical Church, 269 from Not found out, 52 from United Methodist Church, 40 from Greek Catholic Church, 35 from Christian Congregations in Slovakia, 30 from Calvinist Church, 18 from Other and not ascertained christian church, 18 from Apostolic Church, 11 from Ad hoc movements, 10 from Other, 8 from Eastern Orthodox Church, 7 from Jehovah's Witnesses, 6 from Buddhism, 4 from Jewish community, 3 from Old Catholic Church, 3 from Islam, 2 from Paganism and natural spirituality, 1 from Seventh-day Adventist Church and 1 from Baptists Church.

According to the 2001 census, the town had 6,078 inhabitants. 59.46% of inhabitants were Slovaks, 38.50% Hungarians, 0.92% Roma and 0.53% Czechs. The religious makeup was 66.78% Roman Catholics, 18.02% people with no religious affiliation and 9.62% Lutherans.

== Twin towns – sister cities ==
Sládkovičovo is twinned with:

- Csorvás, Hungary
- Diosig, Romania
- Ivančice, Czech Republic
