= Dudváh =

Physical characteristics
- Source
  - location: Little Carpathians
- Mouth
  - location: Váh
  - coordinates: 48.3598°N 17.7547°E
- Length: 41.7 km (25.9 mi)
- Basin size: 499 km^{2} (193 sq mi)

Basin features
- Progression: Váh→ Danube→ Black Sea

The Dudváh (also: Horný Dudváh, Hungarian: Dudvág) is a lowland river in western Slovakia. Its source is located in the Čachtice Little Carpathians, and it mostly runs in parallel to the Váh river. It flows into the Váh near the village of Siladice. Its average discharge flow is 1.3 m³/s near Siladice. It is 41.7 km (25.9 mi) long and its basin size is 499 km^{2} (193 sq mi). Its former lower course, the Dolný Dudváh ("lower Dudváh"), branches off close to Siladice and flows towards the south. Near the town Čierna Voda, the Dolný Dudváh flows into the river Čierna voda, which in turn flows into the Little Danube. The Dolný Dudváh is 34.2 km (21.3 mi) long and its basin size is 751 km^{2} (290 sq mi).
