= Dolné Saliby =

Dolné Saliby Alsószeli
- Municipality
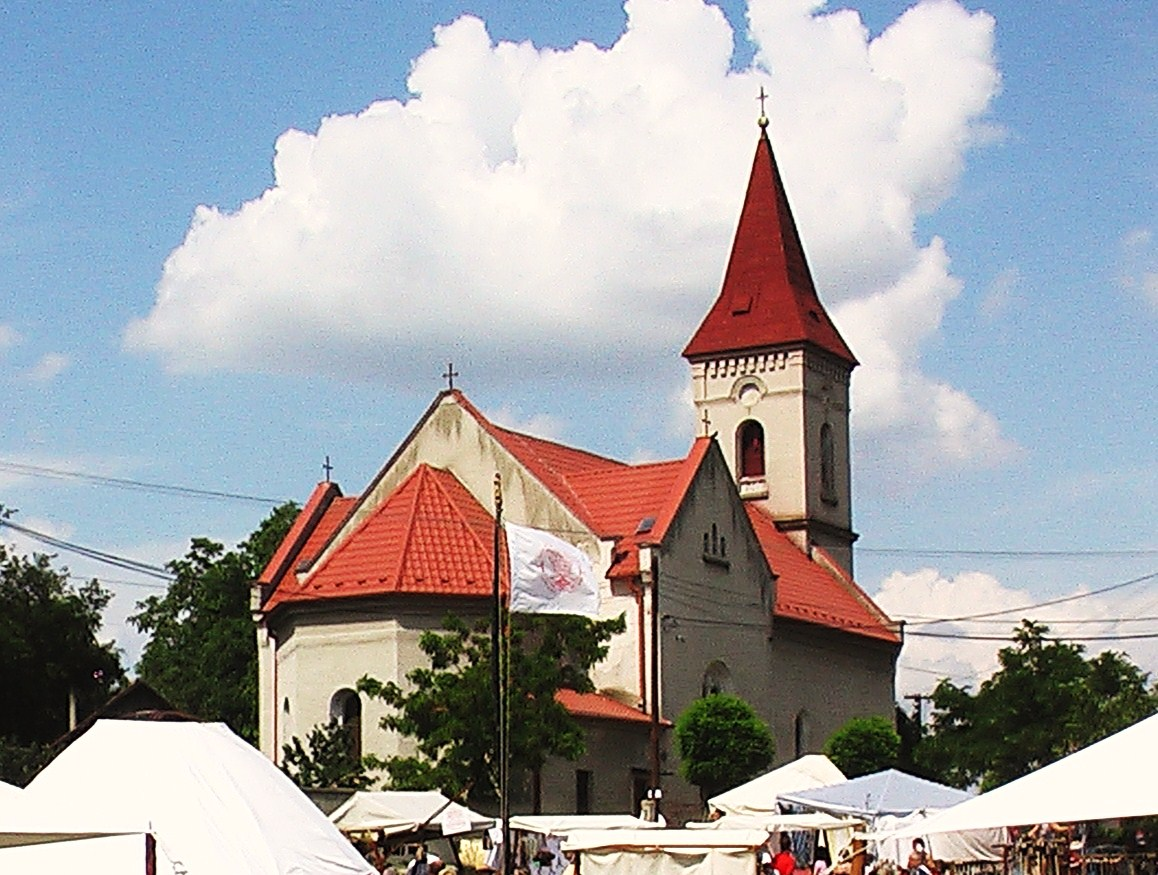
- Church of Saint John the Baptist

- Flag

- Location of Dolné Saliby in the Trnava Region Location of Dolné Saliby in Slovakia
- Coordinates: 48.10°N 17.78°E
- Country: Slovakia
- Region: Trnava Region
- District: Galanta District
- First mentioned: 1158

Government
  - Mayor: Lajos Kovács (SMK-MKP)

Area
  - Total: 18.71 km^{2} (7.22 sq mi)
- Elevation: 115 m (377 ft)

Population (2025)
  - Total: 2,016
- Time zone: UTC+1 (CET)
  - Summer (DST): UTC+2 (CEST)
- Postal code: 925 02
- Area code: +421 31
- Vehicle registration plate (until 2022): GA
- Website: dolnesaliby.sk

Dolné Saliby (Hungarian: Alsószeli) is a village and municipality in Galanta District of the Trnava Region of south-west Slovakia.

== Geography ==
The municipality lies at an altitude of 115 metres (377 ft) and covers an area of 18.71 km^{2} (7.22 sq mi) (2025).

== History ==
In the 9th century, the territory of Dolné Saliby became part of the Kingdom of Hungary. In historical records, the village was first mentioned in 1158. Before the establishment of independent Czechoslovakia in 1918, it was part of Pozsony County. After the Austro-Hungarian army disintegrated in November 1918, Czechoslovak troops occupied the area, later acknowledged internationally by the Treaty of Trianon. Between 1938 and 1945, Dolné Saliby once more became part of Miklós Horthy's Hungary through the First Vienna Award. From 1945 until the Velvet Divorce, it was part of Czechoslovakia. Since then it has been part of Slovakia.

== Population ==
Population statistic (10 years)
Year	1995	2005	2015	2025
Count	1937	1953	1964	2016
Difference		+0.82%	+0.56%	+2.64%

Population statistic
Year	2024	2025
Count	2024	2016
Difference		−0.39%

It has a population of 2016 people (31 December 2025).

=== Ethnicity ===
Census 2021 (1+ %)
Ethnicity	Number	Fraction
Hungarian	1396	69.1%
Slovak	654	32.37%
Not found out	48	2.37%
Total	2020	

In year 2021 was 2020 people by ethnicity 1396 as Hungarian, 654 as Slovak, 48 as Not found out, 16 as Romanian, 6 as Czech, 6 as Other, 3 as Romani, 2 as Ukrainian, 2 as Austrian, 2 as English, 1 as Serbian, 1 as Polish and 1 as German.

Note on population: The difference values of population numbers in the table "Population statistic" and in the sections "Ethnicity" & "Religion" is caused by the use of various statistical methods.

=== Religion ===
Census 2021 (1+ %)
Religion	Number	Fraction
None	812	40.2%
Roman Catholic Church	738	36.53%
Evangelical Church	324	16.04%
Not found out	69	3.42%
Calvinist Church	25	1.24%
Total	2020	

In year 2021 was 2020 people by religion 812 from None, 738 from Roman Catholic Church, 324 from Evangelical Church, 69 from Not found out, 25 from Calvinist Church, 9 from Greek Catholic Church, 8 from Other, 7 from Apostolic Church, 6 from Christian Congregations in Slovakia, 5 from United Methodist Church, 3 from Other and not ascertained christian church, 3 from Ad hoc movements, 2 from Jewish community, 2 from Eastern Orthodox Church, 2 from Jehovah's Witnesses, 2 from Buddhism, 1 from Old Catholic Church, 1 from Seventh-day Adventist Church and 1 from Baptists Church.

== Genealogical resources ==
The records for genealogical research are available at the state archive "Statny Archiv in Bratislava, Banska Bystrica, Bytca, Kosice, Levoca, Nitra, Presov, Slovakia"

- Roman Catholic church records (births/marriages/deaths): 1678-1931 (parish B)
- Lutheran church records (births/marriages/deaths): 1784-1896 (parish A)
- Reformated church records (births/marriages/deaths): 1792-1896 (parish B)

== See also ==
- List of municipalities and towns in Slovakia
