= Topoľnica =

Topoľnica Tósnyárasd
- Municipality
- Flag Coat of arms

- Location of Topoľnica in the Trnava Region Location of Topoľnica in Slovakia
- Coordinates: 48.17°N 17.80°E
- Country: Slovakia
- Region: Trnava Region
- District: Galanta District
- First mentioned: 1307

Government
  - Mayor: Zoltán Szilvási

Area
  - Total: 10.47 km^{2} (4.04 sq mi)
- Elevation: 116 m (381 ft)

Population (2025)
  - Total: 1,017
- Time zone: UTC+1 (CET)
  - Summer (DST): UTC+2 (CEST)
- Postal code: 925 92
- Area code: +421 31
- Vehicle registration plate (until 2022): GA
- Website: www.topolnica.sk

Topoľnica (Hungarian: Tósnyárasd) is a village and municipality in Galanta District of the Trnava Region of south-west Slovakia.

== Geography ==
The municipality lies at an altitude of 116 metres (381 ft) and covers an area of 10.47 km^{2} (4.04 sq mi) (2025).

== History ==
In the 9th century, the territory of Topoľnica became part of the Kingdom of Hungary. In historical records the village was first mentioned in 1307. Before the establishment of independent Czechoslovakia in 1918, it was part of Pozsony County. After the Austro-Hungarian army disintegrated in November 1918, Czechoslovak troops occupied the area, later acknowledged internationally by the Treaty of Trianon. Between 1938 and 1945 Topoľnica once more became part of Miklós Horthy's Hungary through the First Vienna Award. From 1945 until the Velvet Divorce, it was part of Czechoslovakia. Since then it has been part of Slovakia.

== Population ==
Population statistic (10 years)
Year	1995	2005	2015	2025
Count	786	835	815	1017
Difference		+6.23%	−2.39%	+24.78%

Population statistic
Year	2024	2025
Count	992	1017
Difference		+2.52%

It has a population of 1017 people (31 December 2025).

=== Ethnicity ===
Census 2021 (1+ %)
Ethnicity	Number	Fraction
Slovak	467	58.44%
Hungarian	351	43.92%
Not found out	24	3%
Total	799	

In year 2021 was 799 people by ethnicity 467 as Slovak, 351 as Hungarian, 24 as Not found out, 4 as Czech, 2 as Other, 1 as Irish, 1 as Romanian, 1 as Polish and 1 as Korean.

Note on population: The difference values of population numbers in the table "Population statistic" and in the sections "Ethnicity" & "Religion" is caused by the use of various statistical methods.

=== Religion ===
Census 2021 (1+ %)
Religion	Number	Fraction
Roman Catholic Church	441	55.19%
None	282	35.29%
Evangelical Church	43	5.38%
Not found out	12	1.5%
Total	799	

In year 2021 was 799 people by religion 441 from Roman Catholic Church, 282 from None, 43 from Evangelical Church, 12 from Not found out, 7 from Christian Congregations in Slovakia, 5 from Greek Catholic Church, 4 from Calvinist Church, 1 from Old Catholic Church, 1 from Paganism and natural spirituality, 1 from Other and not ascertained christian church, 1 from Buddhism and 1 from Ad hoc movements.
