= Matúškovo =

Matúškovo Taksony
- Municipality
- Flag

- Location of Matúškovo in the Trnava Region Location of Matúškovo in Slovakia
- Coordinates: 48.17°N 17.73°E
- Country: Slovakia
- Region: Trnava Region
- District: Galanta District
- First mentioned: 1138

Government
  - Mayor: Márta Mészáros

Area
  - Total: 11.97 km^{2} (4.62 sq mi)
- Elevation: 118 m (387 ft)

Population (2025)
  - Total: 2,223
- Time zone: UTC+1 (CET)
  - Summer (DST): UTC+2 (CEST)
- Postal code: 925 01
- Area code: +421 31
- Vehicle registration plate (until 2022): GA
- Website: www.matuskovo.sk

Matúškovo (formerly Takšoň; Hungarian: Taksony, until 1899 Taksonyfalva) is a village and municipality in the Galanta District of the Trnava Region of south-west Slovakia.

== Geography ==
The municipality lies at an altitude of 118 metres (387 ft) and covers an area of 11.97 km^{2} (4.62 sq mi) (2025).

== History ==
In the 9th century, the territory of Matúškovo became part of the Kingdom of Hungary. In historical records the village was first mentioned in 1138. Before the establishment of independent Czechoslovakia in 1918, it was part of Pozsony County. After the Austro-Hungarian army disintegrated in November 1918, Czechoslovak troops occupied the area, later acknowledged internationally by the Treaty of Trianon. Between 1938 and 1945 Matúškovo once more became part of Miklós Horthy's Hungary through the First Vienna Award. From 1945 until the Velvet Divorce, it was part of Czechoslovakia. Since then, it has been part of Slovakia.

== Population ==
Population statistic (10 years)
Year	1995	2005	2015	2025
Count	1781	1945	2121	2223
Difference		+9.20%	+9.04%	+4.80%

Population statistic
Year	2024	2025
Count	2248	2223
Difference		−1.11%

It has a population of 2223 people (31 December 2025).

=== Ethnicity ===
Census 2021 (1+ %)
Ethnicity	Number	Fraction
Hungarian	1229	54.33%
Slovak	1069	47.25%
Not found out	57	2.51%
Total	2262	

In year 2021 was 2262 people by ethnicity 1229 as Hungarian, 1069 as Slovak, 57 as Not found out, 5 as Other, 4 as Czech, 4 as Vietnamese, 3 as Jewish, 2 as Korean, 1 as Italian, 1 as Romani, 1 as Rusyn, 1 as Russian, 1 as Austrian, 1 as German and 1 as French.

Note on population: The difference values of population numbers in the table "Population statistic" and in the sections "Ethnicity" & "Religion" is caused by the use of various statistical methods.

=== Religion ===
Census 2021 (1+ %)
Religion	Number	Fraction
Roman Catholic Church	1216	53.76%
None	676	29.89%
Evangelical Church	192	8.49%
Not found out	64	2.83%
Calvinist Church	40	1.77%
Total	2262	

In year 2021 was 2262 people by religion 1216 from Roman Catholic Church, 676 from None, 192 from Evangelical Church, 64 from Not found out, 40 from Calvinist Church, 16 from Jehovah's Witnesses, 16 from Apostolic Church, 8 from Greek Catholic Church, 7 from Jewish community, 7 from Other, 6 from Other and not ascertained christian church, 5 from Christian Congregations in Slovakia, 3 from United Methodist Church, 2 from Eastern Orthodox Church, 2 from Ad hoc movements, 1 from Islam and 1 from Hinduism.
