= Veľký Grob =

- Municipality
- Flag

- Location of Veľký Grob in the Trnava Region Location of Veľký Grob in Slovakia
- Coordinates: 48.25°N 17.50°E
- Country: Slovakia
- Region: Trnava Region
- District: Galanta District
- First mentioned: 1335

Area
  - Total: 23.54 km^{2} (9.09 sq mi)
- Elevation: 122 m (400 ft)

Population (2025)
  - Total: 1,444
- Time zone: UTC+1 (CET)
  - Summer (DST): UTC+2 (CEST)
- Postal code: 925 27
- Area code: +421 31
- Vehicle registration plate (until 2022): GA
- Website: www.velkygrob.sk

Veľký Grob (Hungarian: Magyargurab) is a village and municipality in Galanta District of the Trnava Region of south-west Slovakia.

== History ==
In historical records the village was first mentioned in 1335 (Grwb). The name derives from German Graben ("ditch"). An extended historic name Nemecký ("German") Grob (Hungarian: Német-Gurab) dates back to the 16th century. It distinguished the village from Chorvátsky ("Croatian") Grob and Slovenský ("Slovak") Grob. Before the establishment of independent Czechoslovakia in 1918, Veľký Grob was part of Pozsony County within the Kingdom of Hungary.

== Geography ==
The municipality lies at an altitude of 122 metres (400 ft) and covers an area of 23.54 km^{2} (9.09 sq mi) (2025).

== Population ==
Population statistic (10 years)
Year	1995	2005	2015	2025
Count	1246	1288	1321	1444
Difference		+3.37%	+2.56%	+9.31%

Population statistic
Year	2024	2025
Count	1451	1444
Difference		−0.48%

It has a population of 1444 people (31 December 2025).

=== Ethnicity ===
Census 2021 (1+ %)
Ethnicity	Number	Fraction
Slovak	1314	92.21%
Not found out	79	5.54%
Hungarian	35	2.45%
Total	1425	

In year 2021 was 1425 people by ethnicity 1314 as Slovak, 79 as Not found out, 35 as Hungarian, 10 as Romani, 9 as Czech, 6 as Rusyn, 3 as Other, 3 as English, 2 as Ukrainian, 2 as Romanian, 1 as Russian, 1 as Austrian, 1 as Polish and 1 as Bulgarian.

Note on population: The difference values of population numbers in the table "Population statistic" and in the sections "Ethnicity" & "Religion" is caused by the use of various statistical methods.

=== Religion ===
Census 2021 (1+ %)
Religion	Number	Fraction
Roman Catholic Church	541	37.96%
None	394	27.65%
Evangelical Church	326	22.88%
Not found out	99	6.95%
Calvinist Church	17	1.19%
Greek Catholic Church	15	1.05%
Total	1425	

In year 2021 was 1425 people by religion 541 from Roman Catholic Church, 394 from None, 326 from Evangelical Church, 99 from Not found out, 17 from Calvinist Church, 15 from Greek Catholic Church, 9 from Eastern Orthodox Church, 6 from Jehovah's Witnesses, 4 from Christian Congregations in Slovakia, 3 from Other and not ascertained christian church, 3 from Other, 2 from United Methodist Church, 2 from Baptists Church, 2 from Ad hoc movements, 1 from Church of Jesus Christ of Latter-day Saints and 1 from Apostolic Church.
