= Kráľová =

Reservoir in Slovakia

- Kaskády
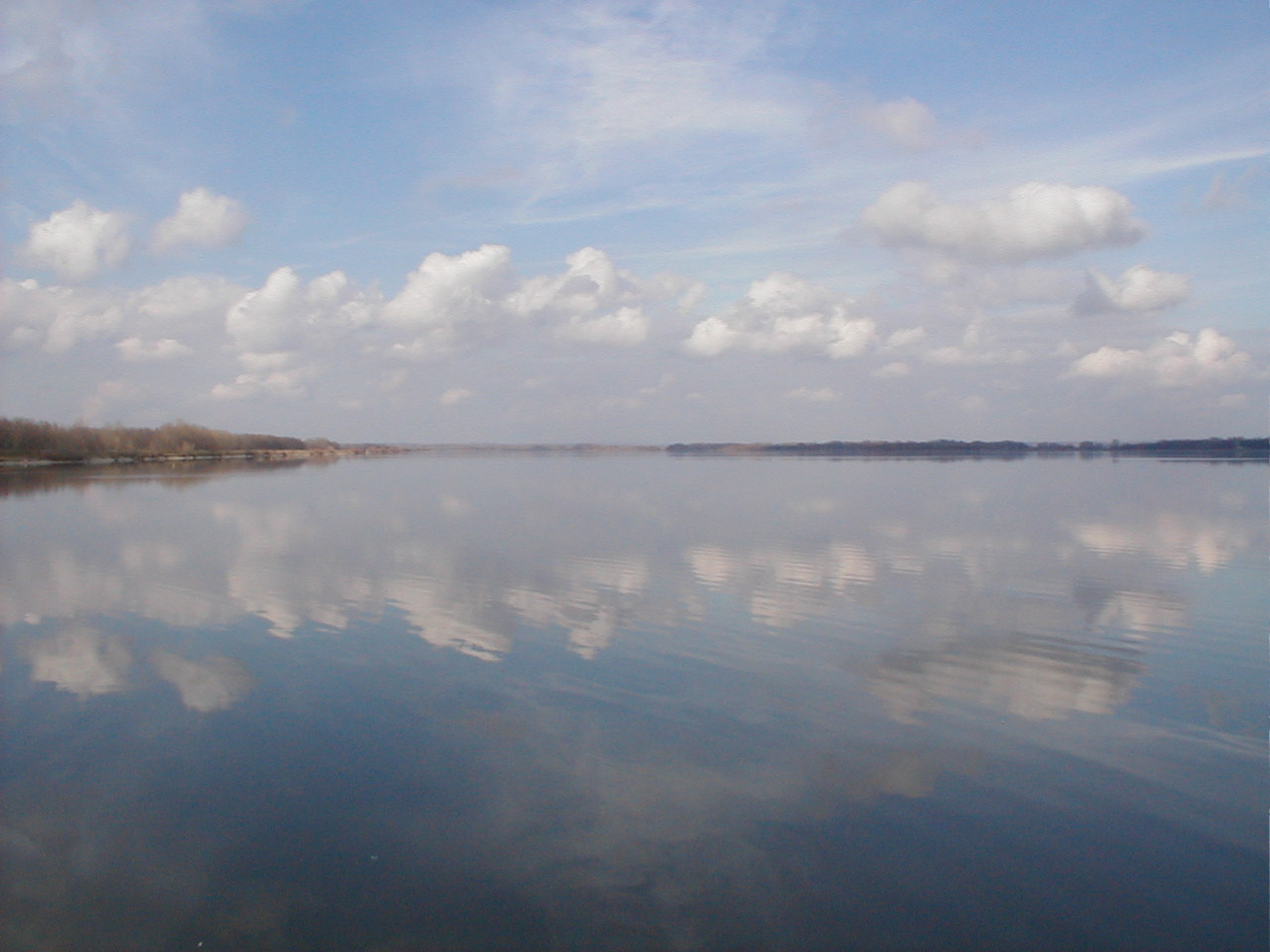
- Interactive map of Kráľová
- Location: Galanta, Trnava Region, Slovakia
- Coordinates: 48.190233°N 17.82935°E
- Type: Reservoir
- Primary inflows: Váh
- Primary outflows: Váh
- Built: 1985
- Surface area: 10.9 km^{2} (4.2 sq mi)
- Water volume: 52 million cubic metres (1.8×10^{9} cu ft)

Kráľová (also known as Kaskády) is a multipurpose water reservoir in Slovakia, between Sereď and Šaľa. It is built on the Váh River between 44.2 and 78.6 river kilometres.

Kráľová was completed in 1985 with the aim of using the Váh River for energy, flood protection of the adjacent area, for gravel mining, as a reservoir for irrigation water, for navigability of the given section of the Váh, for fish farming and as an environment for recreation and water sports. It is part of the Váh Cascade dam system.

The reservoir contains a Hydroelectric power plant that was built between the years 1980–1985 according to the Hydroconsult Bratislava project. Nowadays, the building is fully automated and its operation is ensured by only 9 workers.

== History ==
The reservoir was established in 1985 as part of the Váh cascade. In 2008, the reservoir together with the adjacent forests, was declared a protected bird area. In 2019, it celebrated its 40th anniversary by organizing an event for the employees and the public on the occasion.

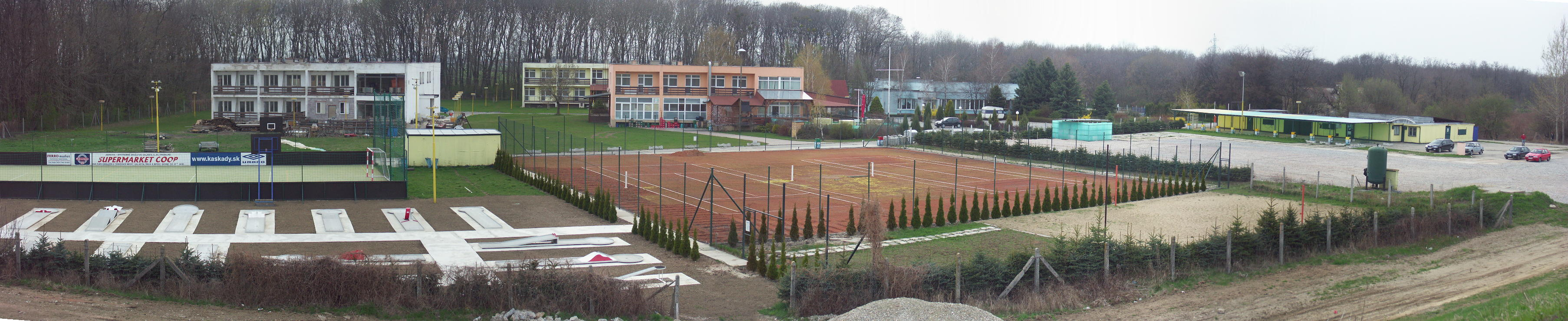
The sports facilities in 2006. It is now abandoned.

Nowadays, Kráľová has a multi-purpose use. It serves as a flood protection, a supply of irrigation water, for gravel mining, there is a fish breeding station and is also used for sports and recreational purposes.

== Life ==
Around the reservoir, species of water birds such as gulls, wild ducks, swans and grey herons have been found. Kráľová is an important nesting site of black-crowned night herons. The reservoir plays a significant role during the migration of water birds. The varying depths and the ancient riverbed of the Váh create favorable conditions for various lowland fish species.

In December 2025, parts of the protected forest were chopped down. The Slovak Ornithological Society criticized the logging of the forest but the state-owned enterprise LESY SR rejected the claims of "destruction of the habitat", speaking of a professional procedure in full compliance with nature protection. The intervention, although carried out outside the breeding season, represented a problem for nature conservation of the protected area, as it threatened half of the breeding habitats in the Kráľová Nature Reserve. In the cut-down parts of the forest, 70 nests of night herons with chicks and 50 nests of grey herons with chicks were recorded earlier during the breeding season of 2025.

== Hydroelectric power plant ==
The Kráľová hydroelectric power plant, situated near the end of the Kráľová reservoir, is the last large hydroelectric power plant on the Váh River. The plant was finished in 1985. Its construction took five years. That year, artist František Chrástek painted his work on large concrete panels in the engine room on the Kráľová plant, taking him three months to complete his works. It is equipped with two units, each capable of handling 210 m3.s-1, resulting in an overall capacity of 420 m3.s-1 for the power station. With a total installed capacity of 45 MW.

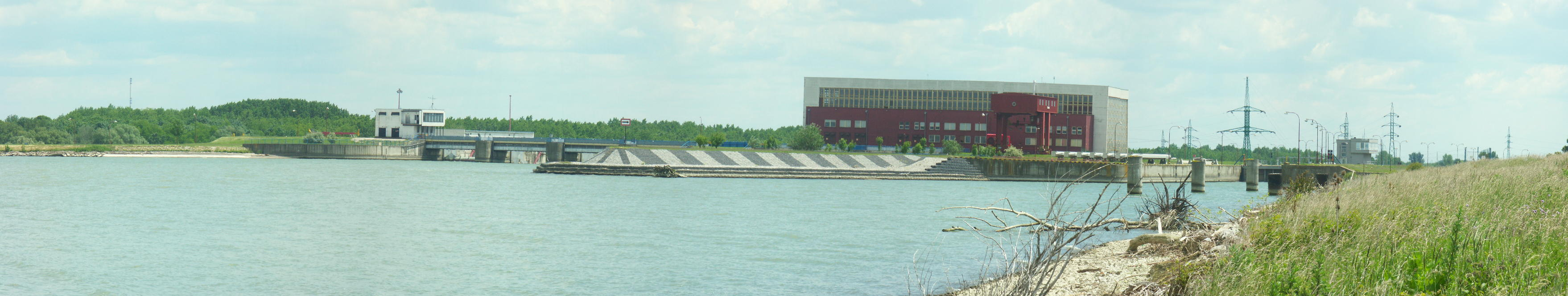
Panorama of the hydroelectric power plant.

== Gallery ==
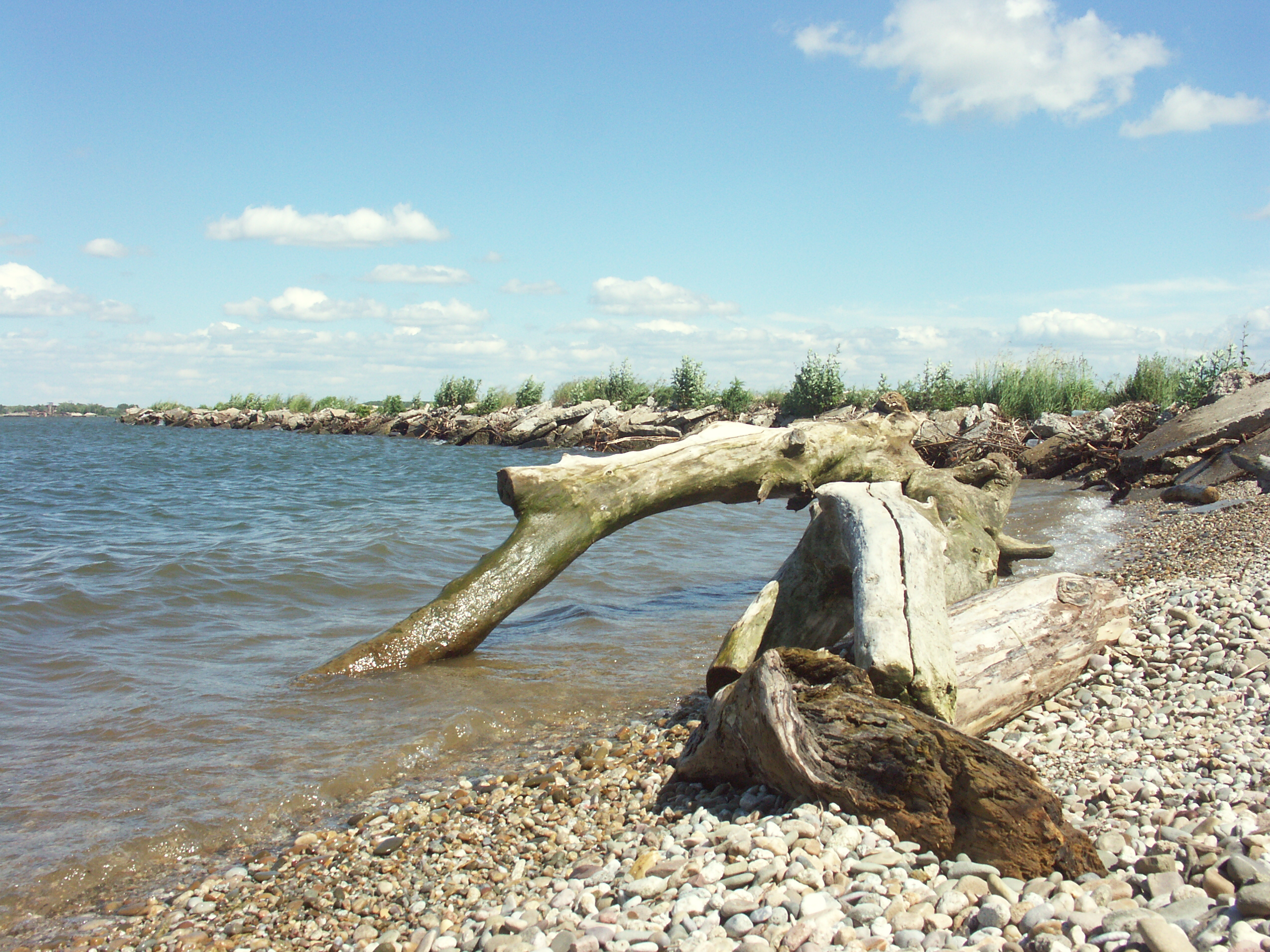
Kráľová waterworks

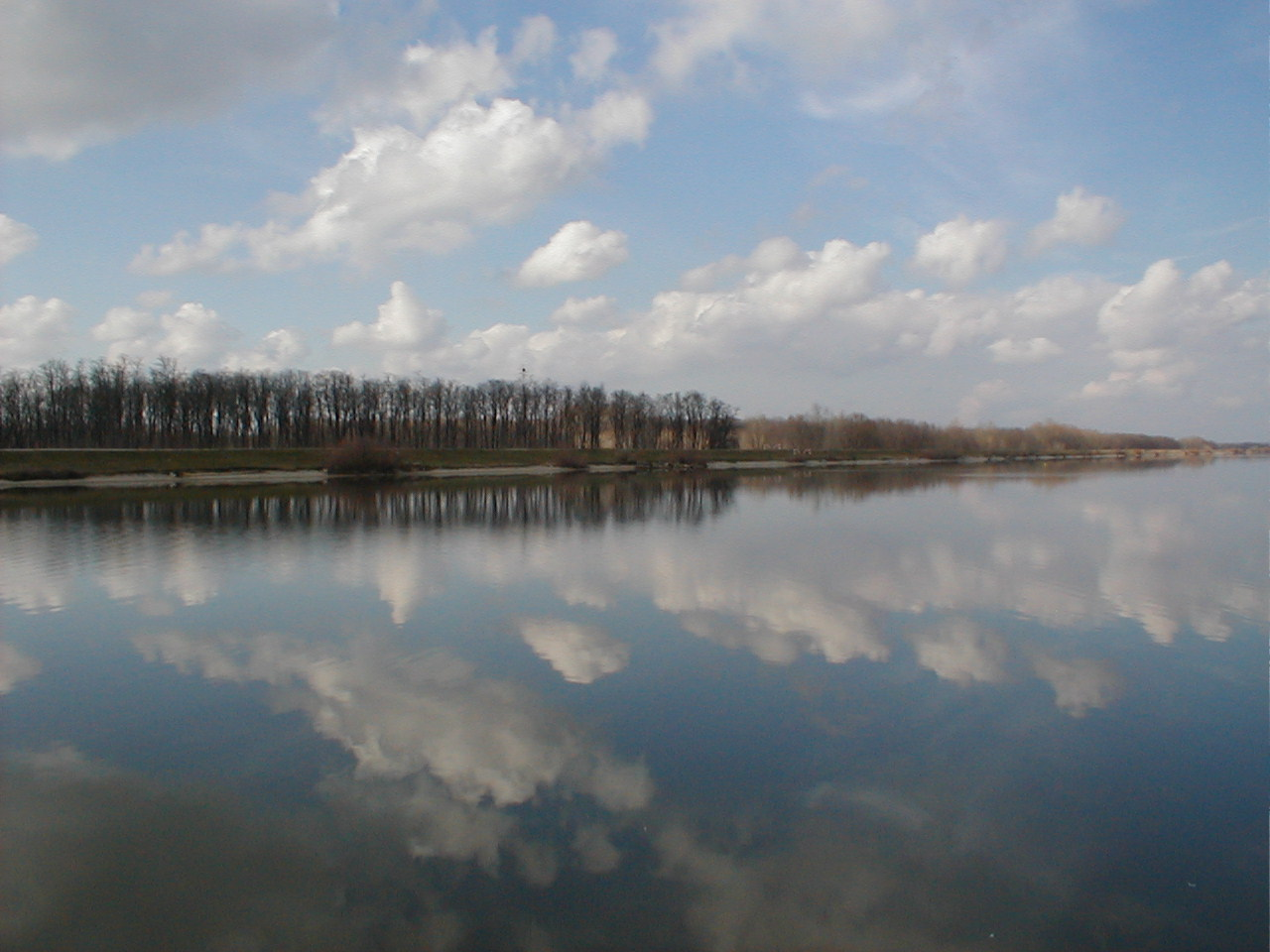
Kráľová in 2006

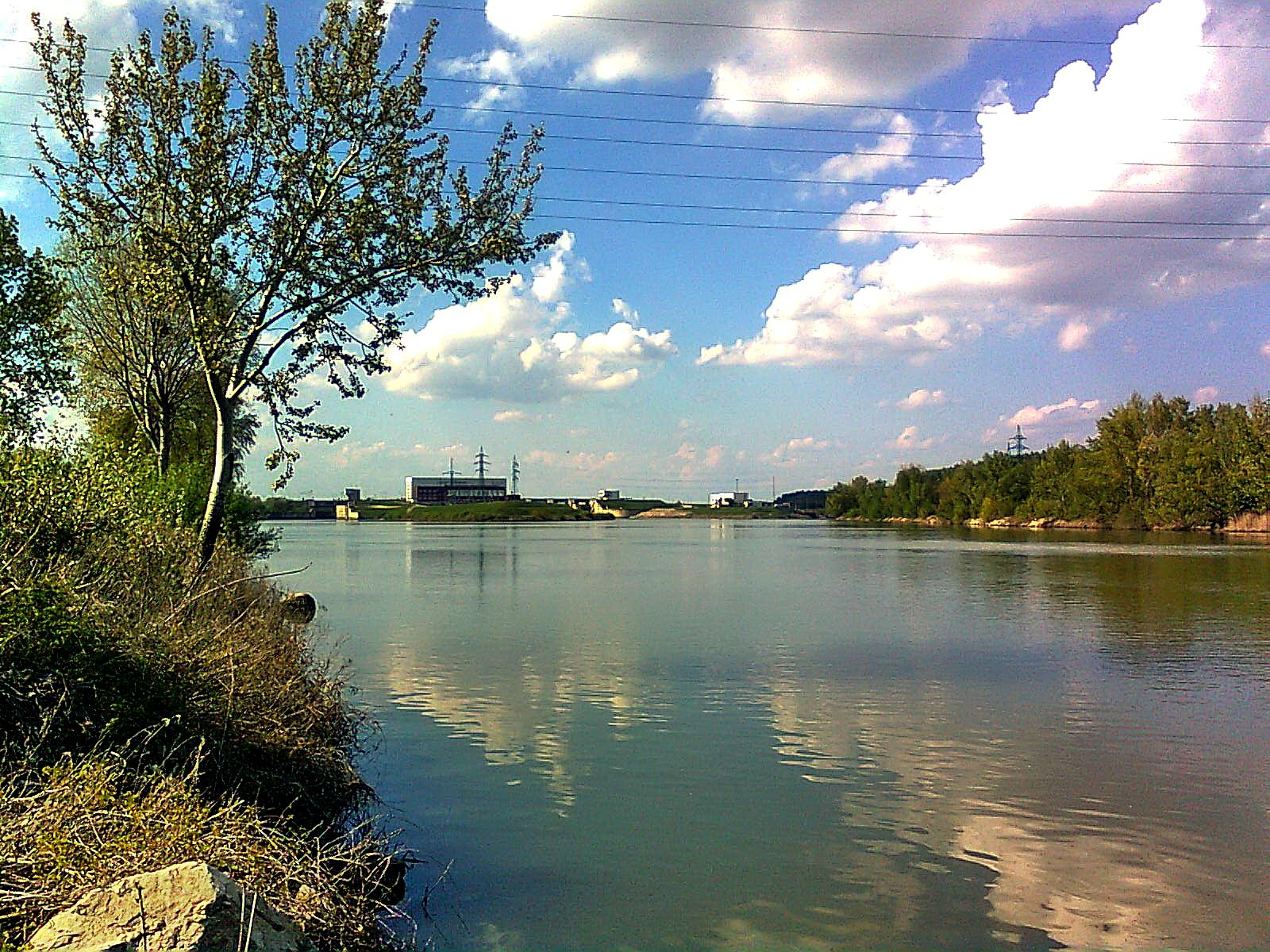
View from Šaľa side

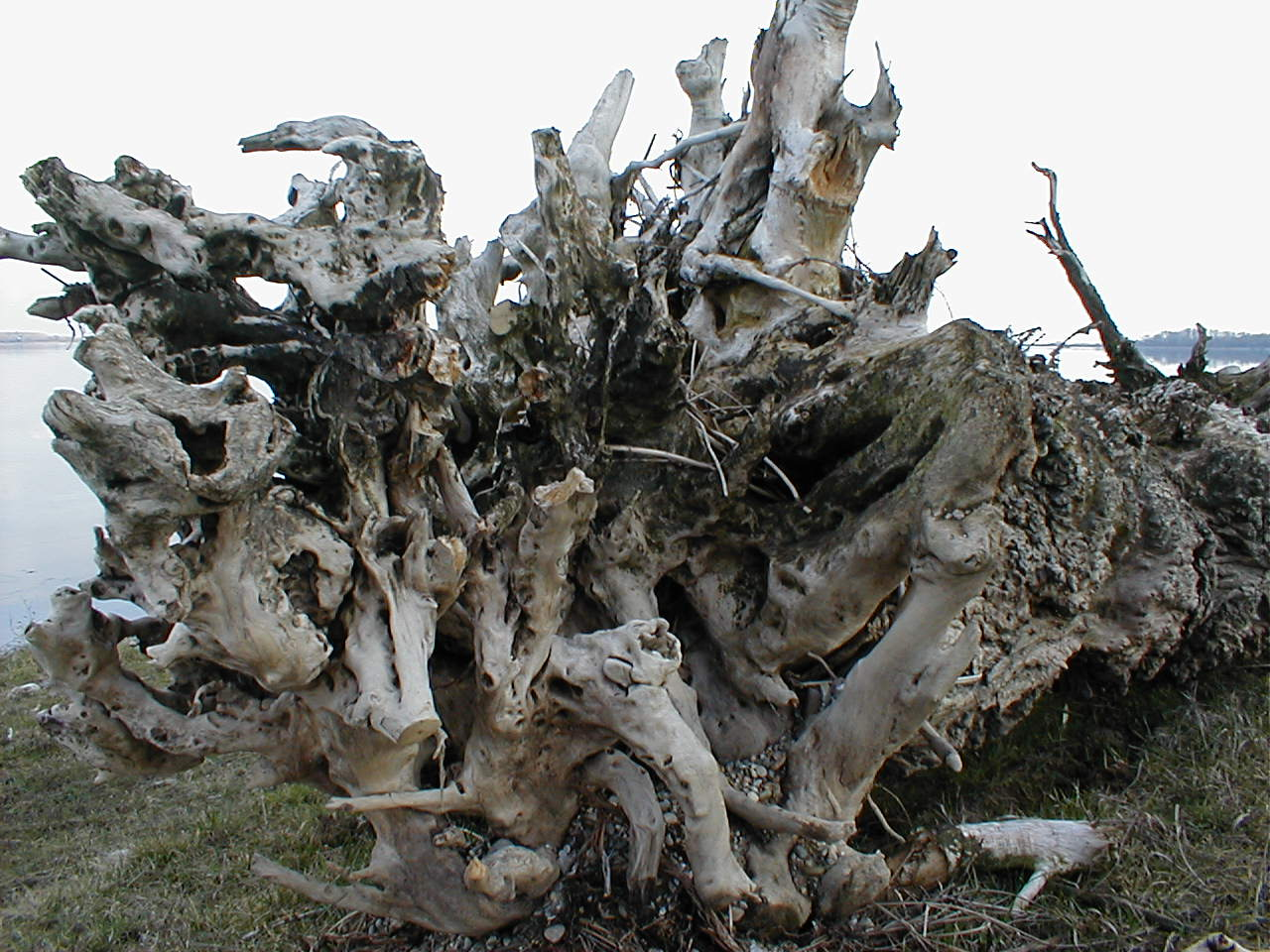
Washed up tree stump
