= Váhovce =

Váhovce Vága
- Municipality
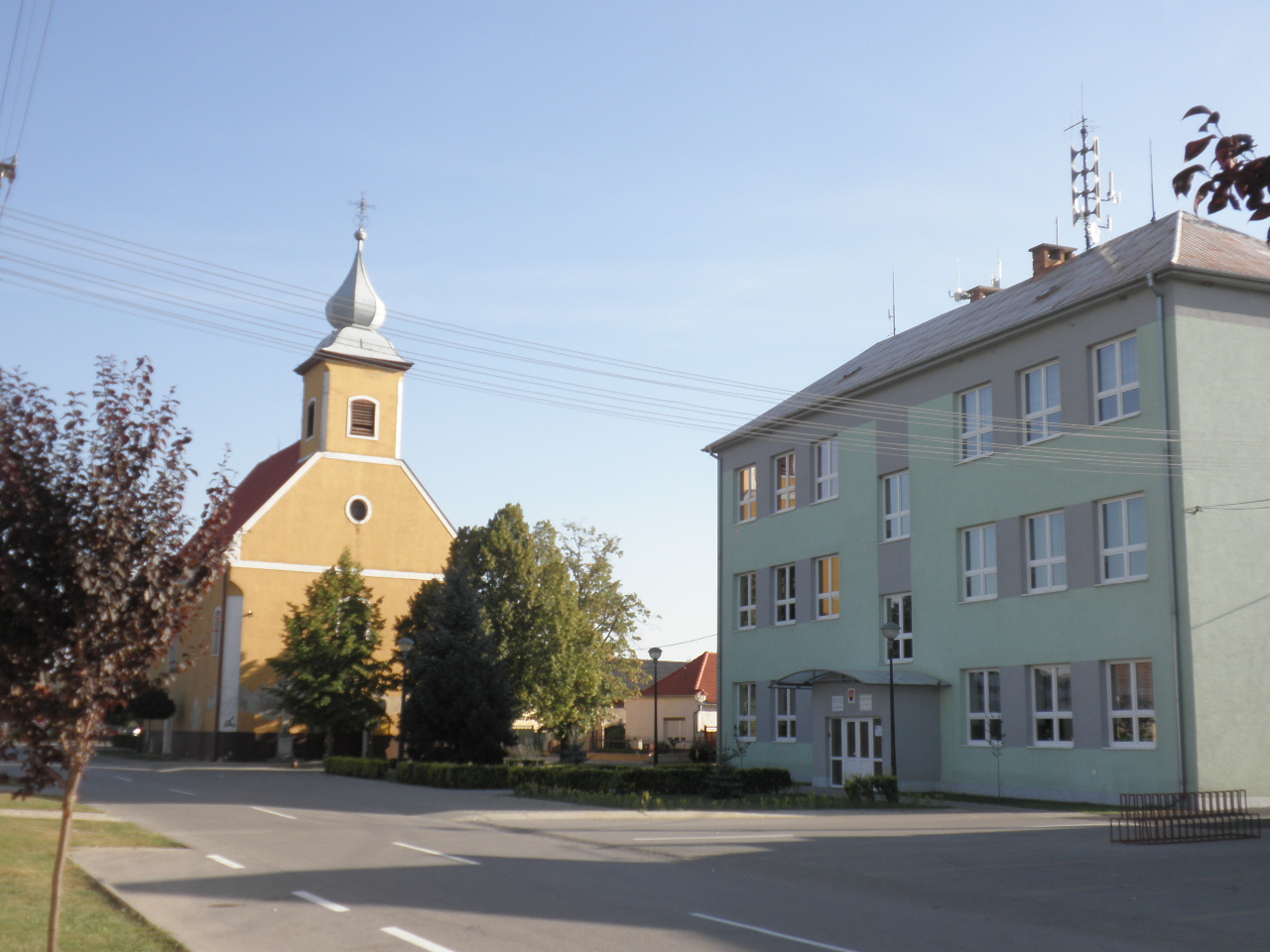

- Flag

- Location of Váhovce in the Trnava Region Location of Váhovce in Slovakia
- Coordinates: 48.25°N 17.78°E
- Country: Slovakia
- Region: Trnava Region
- District: Galanta District
- First mentioned: 1259

Government
  - Mayor: Ferdinand Szalay

Area
  - Total: 15.71 km^{2} (6.07 sq mi)
- Elevation: 123 m (404 ft)

Population (2025)
  - Total: 2,000
- Time zone: UTC+1 (CET)
  - Summer (DST): UTC+2 (CEST)
- Postal code: 925 62
- Area code: +421 31
- Vehicle registration plate (until 2022): GA
- Website: www.obecvahovce.sk

Váhovce (Hungarian: Vága) is a village and municipality in Galanta District of the Trnava Region of south-west Slovakia.

== Geography ==
The municipality lies at an altitude of 123 metres (404 ft) and covers an area of 15.71 km^{2} (6.07 sq mi) (2025).

== History ==
In the 9th century, the territory of Váhovce became part of the Kingdom of Hungary. In historical records the village was first mentioned in 1259. Before the establishment of independent Czechoslovakia in 1918, Váhovce was part of Pozsony County. After the Austro-Hungarian army disintegrated in November 1918, Czechoslovak troops occupied the area, later acknowledged internationally by the Treaty of Trianon. Between 1938 and 1945 Váhovce once more became part of Miklós Horthy's Hungary through the First Vienna Award. From 1945 until the Velvet Divorce, it was part of Czechoslovakia. Since then it has been part of Slovakia.

== Population ==
Population statistic (10 years)
Year	1995	2005	2015	2025
Count	1961	2082	2126	2000
Difference		+6.17%	+2.11%	−5.92%

Population statistic
Year	2024	2025
Count	2008	2000
Difference		−0.39%

It has a population of 2000 people (31 December 2025).

=== Ethnicity ===
Census 2021 (1+ %)
Ethnicity	Number	Fraction
Hungarian	1175	56.03%
Slovak	918	43.77%
Not found out	137	6.53%
Total	2097	

In year 2021 was 2097 people by ethnicity 1175 as Hungarian, 918 as Slovak, 137 as Not found out, 18 as Romani, 9 as Czech, 7 as Other, 3 as German, 2 as Vietnamese, 1 as Serbian, 1 as Romanian and 1 as Moravian.

Note on population: The difference values of population numbers in the table "Population statistic" and in the sections "Ethnicity" & "Religion" is caused by the use of various statistical methods.

=== Religion ===
Census 2021 (1+ %)
Religion	Number	Fraction
Roman Catholic Church	1531	73.01%
None	365	17.41%
Not found out	138	6.58%
Christian Congregations in Slovakia	22	1.05%
Total	2097	

In year 2021 was 2097 people by religion 1531 from Roman Catholic Church, 365 from None, 138 from Not found out, 22 from Christian Congregations in Slovakia, 11 from Evangelical Church, 9 from Greek Catholic Church, 7 from Calvinist Church, 5 from Jehovah's Witnesses, 3 from Ad hoc movements, 2 from Other, 2 from Buddhism, 1 from Eastern Orthodox Church and 1 from Islam.
