= Kajal (village) =

Kajal Nemeskajal
- Municipality
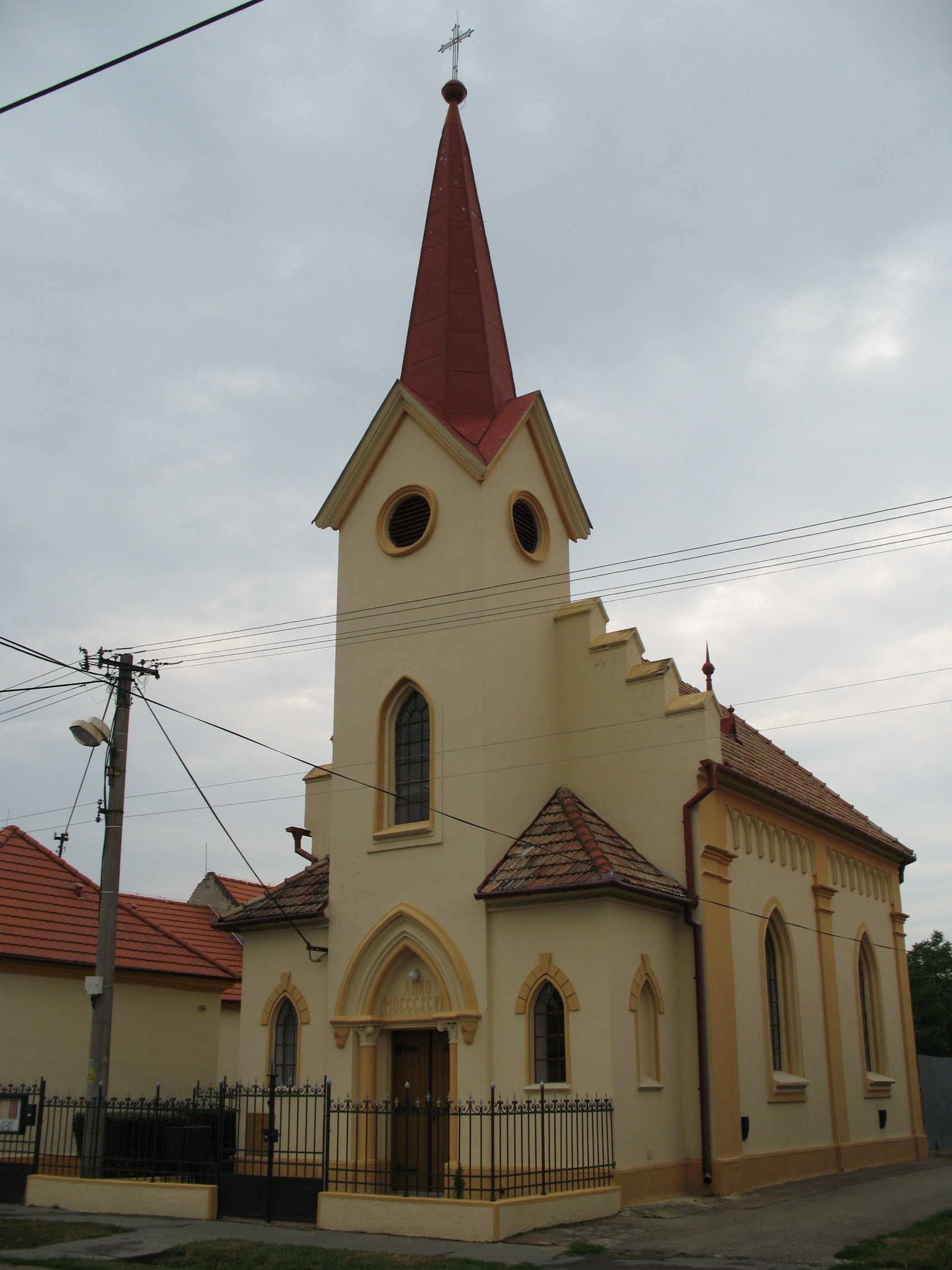

- Location of Kajal in the Trnava Region Location of Kajal in Slovakia
- Coordinates: 48°11′04″N 17°47′14″E
- Country: Slovakia
- Region: Trnava Region
- District: Galanta District
- First mentioned: 1297

Area
  - Total: 13.08 km^{2} (5.05 sq mi)
- Elevation: 117 m (384 ft)

Population (2025)
  - Total: 1,548
- Time zone: UTC+1 (CET)
  - Summer (DST): UTC+2 (CEST)
- Postal code: 925 92
- Area code: +421 31
- Vehicle registration plate (until 2022): GA
- Website: www.kajal.sk

Kajal (Hungarian: Nemeskajal, until 1899 Kajal) is a village and municipality in Galanta District of the Trnava Region of south-west Slovakia.

== Geography ==
The municipality lies at an altitude of 117 metres (384 ft) and covers an area of 13.08 km^{2} (5.05 sq mi) (2025).

== History ==
In the 9th century, the territory of Kajal became part of the Kingdom of Hungary. In historical records the village was first mentioned in 1297. Before the establishment of independent Czechoslovakia in 1918, it was part of Pozsony County. After the Austro-Hungarian army disintegrated in November 1918, Czechoslovak troops occupied the area, later acknowledged internationally by the Treaty of Trianon. Between 1938 and 1945 Kajal once more became part of Miklós Horthy's Hungary through the First Vienna Award. From 1945 until the Velvet Divorce, it was part of Czechoslovakia. Since then it has been part of Slovakia.

== Population ==
Population statistic (10 years)
Year	1995	2005	2015	2025
Count	1339	1459	1538	1548
Difference		+8.96%	+5.41%	+0.65%

Population statistic
Year	2024	2025
Count	1549	1548
Difference		−0.06%

It has a population of 1548 people (31 December 2025).

=== Ethnicity ===
Census 2021 (1+ %)
Ethnicity	Number	Fraction
Hungarian	830	53.41%
Slovak	645	41.5%
Not found out	150	9.65%
Total	1554	

In year 2021 was 1554 people by ethnicity 830 as Hungarian, 645 as Slovak, 150 as Not found out, 9 as Romani, 7 as Czech, 4 as Other, 3 as Rusyn, 3 as German, 2 as Austrian, 2 as English, 1 as Ukrainian and 1 as Croatian.

Note on population: The difference values of population numbers in the table "Population statistic" and in the sections "Ethnicity" & "Religion" is caused by the use of various statistical methods.

=== Religion ===
Census 2021 (1+ %)
Religion	Number	Fraction
Roman Catholic Church	877	56.44%
None	409	26.32%
Not found out	140	9.01%
Evangelical Church	70	4.5%
Total	1554	

In year 2021 was 1554 people by religion 877 from Roman Catholic Church, 409 from None, 140 from Not found out, 70 from Evangelical Church, 11 from Other and not ascertained christian church, 9 from Greek Catholic Church, 8 from Calvinist Church, 8 from Jehovah's Witnesses, 6 from Christian Congregations in Slovakia, 4 from Other, 4 from Buddhism, 3 from Seventh-day Adventist Church, 2 from Apostolic Church, 1 from Eastern Orthodox Church, 1 from Church of the Brethren and 1 from Ad hoc movements.

== Genealogical resources ==
The records for genealogical research are available at the state archive "Statny Archiv in Bratislava, Nitra, Slovakia"

- Roman Catholic church records (births/marriages/deaths): 1691-1902 (parish A)
- Lutheran church records (births/marriages/deaths): 1786-1916 (parish B)
- Reformated church records (births/marriages/deaths): 1792-1896 (parish B)

== See also ==
- List of municipalities and towns in Slovakia
