= Malá Mača =

- Municipality
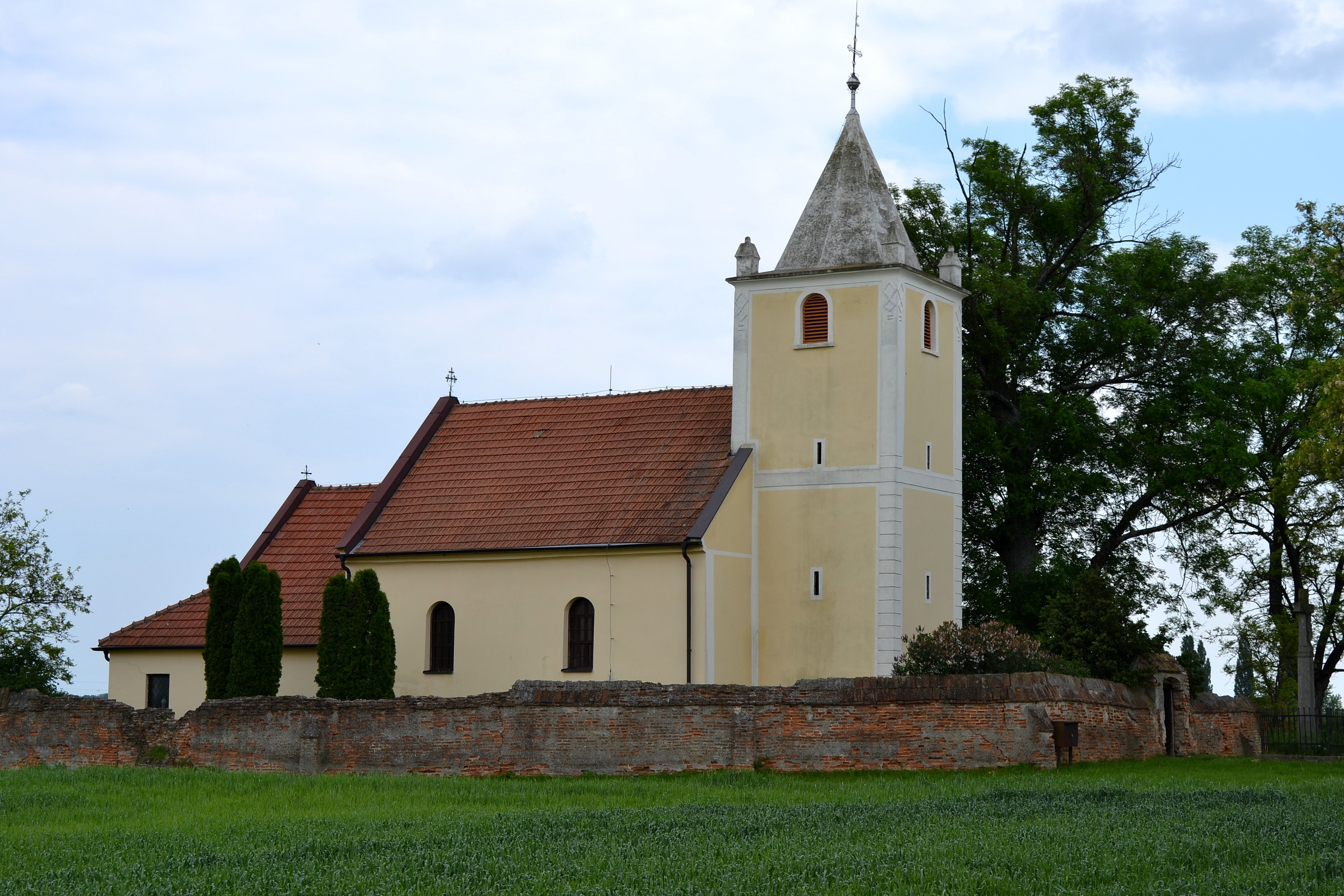

- Flag

- Location of Malá Mača in the Trnava Region Location of Malá Mača in Slovakia
- Coordinates: 48°13′21″N 17°38′24″E
- Country: Slovakia
- Region: Trnava Region
- District: Galanta District
- First mentioned: 1326

Area
  - Total: 0.00 km^{2} (0 sq mi)
- Elevation: 121 m (397 ft)

Population (2025)
  - Total: 587
- Time zone: UTC+1 (CET)
  - Summer (DST): UTC+2 (CEST)
- Postal code: 925 21
- Area code: +421 31
- Vehicle registration plate (until 2022): GA
- Website: www.obecmalamaca.sk

Malá Mača is a village and municipality in the Galanta District of the Trnava Region of south-west Slovakia.

== Geography ==
The municipality lies at an altitude of 121 metres (397 ft) and covers an area of 0.00 km^{2} (0 sq mi) (2025).

== History ==
In the 9th century, the territory of Matúškovo became part of the Kingdom of Hungary. In historical records the village was first mentioned in 1138. Before the establishment of independent Czechoslovakia in 1918, it was part of Pozsony County. After the Austro-Hungarian army disintegrated in November 1918, Czechoslovak troops occupied the area, later acknowledged internationally by the Treaty of Trianon. Between 1938 and 1945 Matúškovo once more became part of Miklós Horthy's Hungary through the First Vienna Award. From 1945 until the Velvet Divorce, it was part of Czechoslovakia. Since then, it has been part of Slovakia.

== Population ==
Population statistic (10 years)
Year	1995	2005	2015	2025
Count	0	601	606	587
Difference		–	+0.83%	−3.13%

Population statistic
Year	2024	2025
Count	607	587
Difference		−3.29%

It has a population of 587 people (31 December 2025).

=== Ethnicity ===
Census 2021 (1+ %)
Ethnicity	Number	Fraction
Slovak	348	59.79%
Hungarian	252	43.29%
Czech	10	1.71%
Not found out	9	1.54%
Total	582	

In year 2021 was 582 people by ethnicity 348 as Slovak, 252 as Hungarian, 10 as Czech, 9 as Not found out, 4 as English, 1 as German and 1 as Greek.

Note on population: The difference values of population numbers in the table "Population statistic" and in the sections "Ethnicity" & "Religion" is caused by the use of various statistical methods.

=== Religion ===
Census 2021 (1+ %)
Religion	Number	Fraction
Roman Catholic Church	328	56.36%
None	152	26.12%
Evangelical Church	56	9.62%
Not found out	16	2.75%
Greek Catholic Church	9	1.55%
Other and not ascertained christian church	6	1.03%
Total	582	

In year 2021 was 582 people by religion 328 from Roman Catholic Church, 152 from None, 56 from Evangelical Church, 16 from Not found out, 9 from Greek Catholic Church, 6 from Other and not ascertained christian church, 5 from Calvinist Church, 3 from Christian Congregations in Slovakia, 3 from Seventh-day Adventist Church, 2 from Jehovah's Witnesses, 1 from Bahá'i Community and 1 from Ad hoc movements.
