= Pusté Úľany =

- Municipality
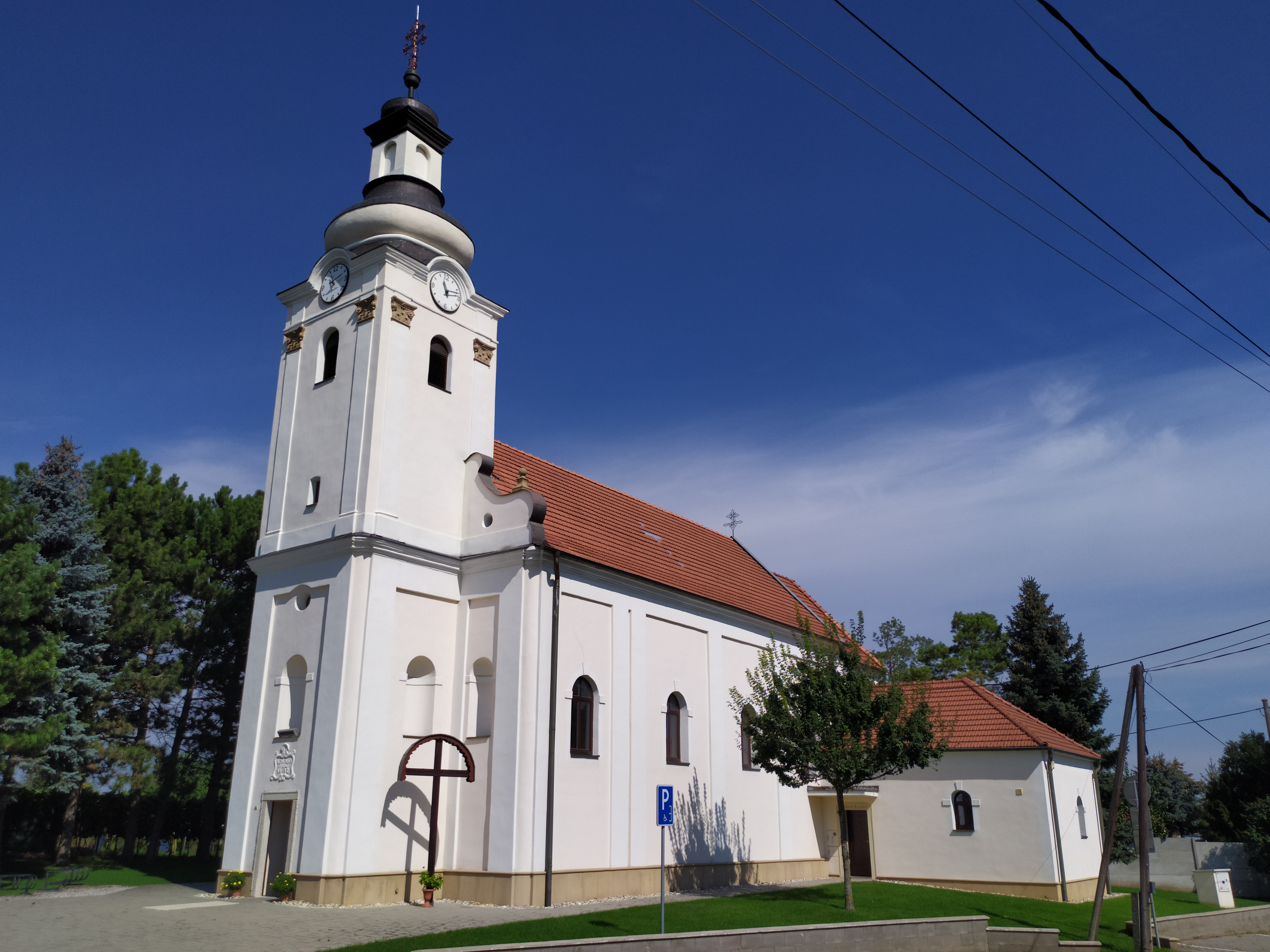

- Flag

- Location of Pusté Úľany in the Trnava Region Location of Pusté Úľany in Slovakia
- Coordinates: 48.23°N 17.57°E
- Country: Slovakia
- Region: Trnava Region
- District: Galanta District
- First mentioned: 1301

Area
  - Total: 24.54 km^{2} (9.47 sq mi)
- Elevation: 124 m (407 ft)

Population (2025)
  - Total: 1,819
- Time zone: UTC+1 (CET)
  - Summer (DST): UTC+2 (CEST)
- Postal code: 925 28
- Area code: +421 31
- Vehicle registration plate (until 2022): GA
- Website: www.pusteulany.sk

Pusté Úľany (Hungarian: Pusztafödémes) is a village and municipality in Galanta District of the Trnava Region of south-west Slovakia.

== History ==
In historical records the village was first mentioned in 1301. Before the establishment of independent Czechoslovakia in 1918, it was part of Pozsony County within the Kingdom of Hungary.

== Geography ==
The municipality lies at an altitude of 124 metres (407 ft) and covers an area of 24.54 km^{2} (9.47 sq mi) (2025).

== Population ==
Population statistic (10 years)
Year	1995	2005	2015	2025
Count	1509	1640	1747	1819
Difference		+8.68%	+6.52%	+4.12%

Population statistic
Year	2024	2025
Count	1822	1819
Difference		−0.16%

It has a population of 1819 people (31 December 2025).

=== Ethnicity ===
Census 2021 (1+ %)
Ethnicity	Number	Fraction
Slovak	1742	95.5%
Hungarian	47	2.57%
Not found out	39	2.13%
Total	1824	

In year 2021 was 1824 people by ethnicity 1742 as Slovak, 47 as Hungarian, 39 as Not found out, 10 as Czech, 7 as Other, 5 as Polish, 4 as Bulgarian, 3 as English, 2 as Romanian, 1 as Romani, 1 as Rusyn, 1 as Russian and 1 as Moravian.

Note on population: The difference values of population numbers in the table "Population statistic" and in the sections "Ethnicity" & "Religion" is caused by the use of various statistical methods.

=== Religion ===
Census 2021 (1+ %)
Religion	Number	Fraction
Roman Catholic Church	1246	68.31%
None	432	23.68%
Evangelical Church	50	2.74%
Not found out	47	2.58%
Total	1824	

In year 2021 was 1824 people by religion 1246 from Roman Catholic Church, 432 from None, 50 from Evangelical Church, 47 from Not found out, 17 from Greek Catholic Church, 9 from Ad hoc movements, 7 from Other, 5 from Paganism and natural spirituality, 4 from Calvinist Church, 3 from Eastern Orthodox Church, 2 from Christian Congregations in Slovakia, 1 from Jehovah's Witnesses and 1 from Buddhism.
