= Abrahám =

Abrahám Ábrahám
- Municipality
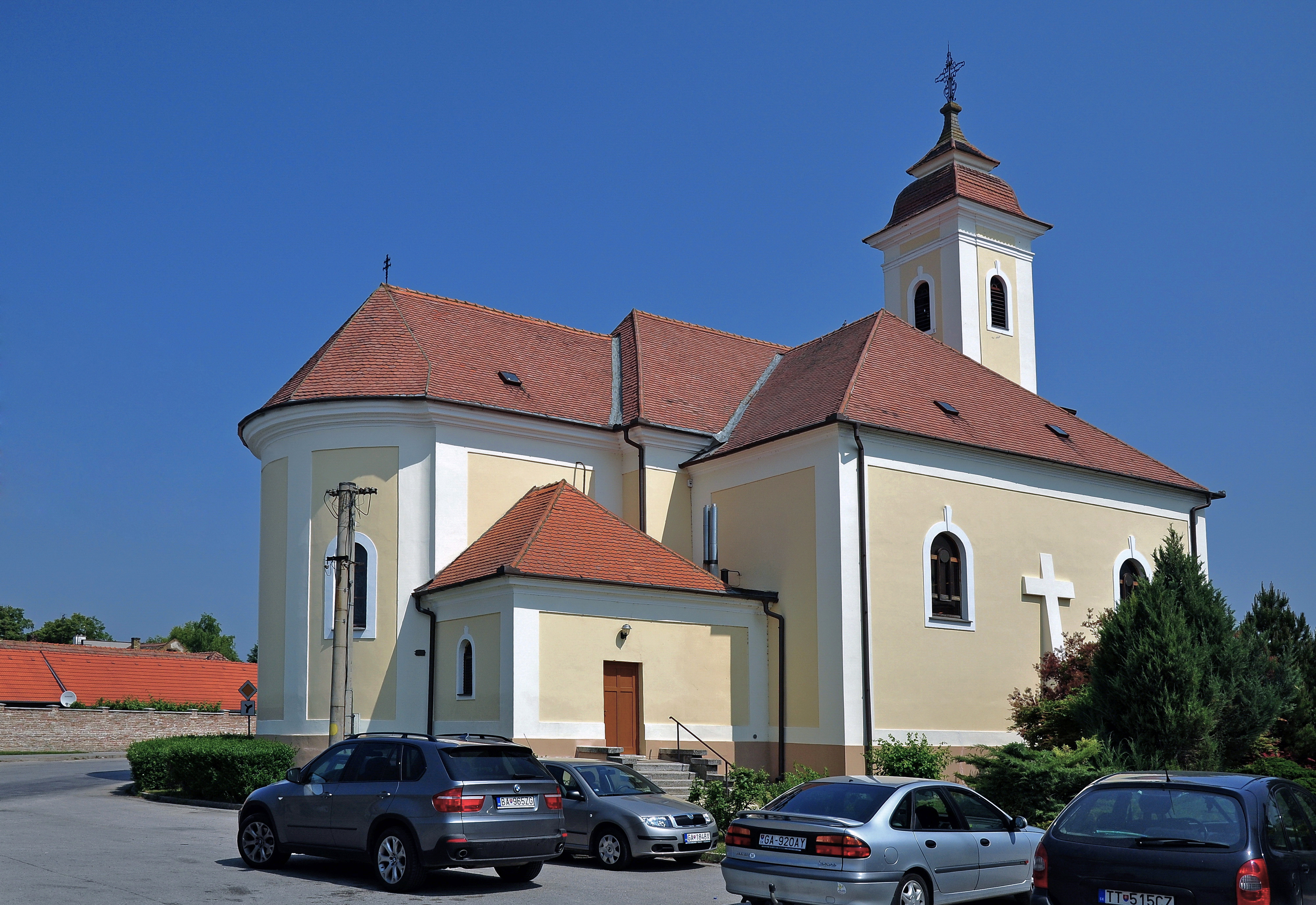

- Flag

- Location of Abrahám in the Trnava Region Location of Abrahám in Slovakia
- Coordinates: 48.25°N 17.62°E
- Country: Slovakia
- Region: Trnava Region
- District: Galanta District
- First mentioned: 1266

Area
  - Total: 15.77 km^{2} (6.09 sq mi)
- Elevation: 125 m (410 ft)

Population (2025)
  - Total: 1,094
- Time zone: UTC+1 (CET)
  - Summer (DST): UTC+2 (CEST)
- Postal code: 925 45
- Area code: +421 31
- Vehicle registration plate (until 2022): GA
- Website: abraham.sk

Abrahám (Hungarian: Ábrahám) is a village and municipality in Galanta District of the Trnava Region of south-west Slovakia.

== History ==
In historical records the village was first mentioned in 1266. Before the establishment of independent Czechoslovakia in 1918, it was part of Pozsony County within the Kingdom of Hungary.

== Geography ==
The municipality lies at an altitude of 125 metres (410 ft) and covers an area of 15.77 km^{2} (6.09 sq mi) (2025).

== Population ==
Population statistic (10 years)
Year	1995	2005	2015	2025
Count	1153	1061	1031	1094
Difference		−7.97%	−2.82%	+6.11%

Population statistic
Year	2024	2025
Count	1112	1094
Difference		−1.61%

It has a population of 1094 people (31 December 2025).

=== Ethnicity ===
Census 2021 (1+ %)
Ethnicity	Number	Fraction
Slovak	1088	97.14%
Not found out	16	1.42%
Hungarian	14	1.25%
Total	1120	

In year 2021 was 1120 people by ethnicity 1088 as Slovak, 16 as Not found out, 14 as Hungarian, 5 as Other, 3 as Jewish, 3 as Russian, 2 as Romani, 1 as Czech, 1 as Ukrainian, 1 as Italian, 1 as German and 1 as English.

Note on population: The difference values of population numbers in the table "Population statistic" and in the sections "Ethnicity" & "Religion" is caused by the use of various statistical methods.

=== Religion ===
Census 2021 (1+ %)
Religion	Number	Fraction
Roman Catholic Church	819	73.13%
None	239	21.34%
Not found out	21	1.88%
Evangelical Church	18	1.61%
Total	1120	

In year 2021 was 1120 people by religion 819 from Roman Catholic Church, 239 from None, 21 from Not found out, 18 from Evangelical Church, 6 from Greek Catholic Church, 4 from Other and not ascertained christian church, 3 from Other, 2 from Jewish community, 2 from Calvinist Church, 2 from Christian Congregations in Slovakia, 2 from Ad hoc movements, 1 from Old Catholic Church and 1 from Eastern Orthodox Church.

== Genealogical resources ==
The records for genealogical research are available at the state archive in Bratislava (Slovak: Štátny archív v Bratislave).

- Roman Catholic church records (births/marriages/deaths): 1688-1895
- Lutheran church records (births/marriages/deaths): 1701-1896
- Census records 1869 of Abram are not available at the state archive.

== See also ==
- List of municipalities and towns in Slovakia
