= Mostová =

Mostová Hidaskürt
- Municipality
- Flag

- Location of Mostová in the Trnava Region Location of Mostová in Slovakia
- Coordinates: 48.14°N 17.68°E
- Country: Slovakia
- Region: Trnava Region
- District: Galanta District
- First mentioned: 1245

Government
  - Mayor: Tibor Rózsár JuDr

Area
  - Total: 25.15 km^{2} (9.71 sq mi)
- Elevation: 117 m (384 ft)

Population (2025)
  - Total: 1,576
- Time zone: UTC+1 (CET)
  - Summer (DST): UTC+2 (CEST)
- Postal code: 925 07
- Area code: +421 31
- Vehicle registration plate (until 2022): GA
- Website: obecmostova.sk

Mostová (Hungarian: Hidaskürt) is a village and municipality in Galanta District of the Trnava Region of south-west Slovakia.

== Geography ==
The municipality lies at an altitude of 117 metres (384 ft) and covers an area of 25.15 km^{2} (9.71 sq mi) (2025).

== History ==
In historical records the village was first mentioned in 1245. Before the establishment of independent Czechoslovakia in 1918, it was part of Pozsony County within the Kingdom of Hungary. After the Austro-Hungarian army disintegrated in November 1918, Czechoslovak troops occupied the area, later acknowledged internationally by the Treaty of Trianon. Between 1938 and 1945 Mostová once more became part of Miklós Horthy's Hungary through the First Vienna Award. From 1945 until the Velvet Divorce, it was part of Czechoslovakia. Since then it has been part of Slovakia.

== Population ==
Population statistic (10 years)
Year	1995	2005	2015	2025
Count	1588	1593	1603	1576
Difference		+0.31%	+0.62%	−1.68%

Population statistic
Year	2024	2025
Count	1562	1576
Difference		+0.89%

It has a population of 1576 people (31 December 2025).

=== Ethnicity ===
Census 2021 (1+ %)
Ethnicity	Number	Fraction
Hungarian	1222	77.43%
Slovak	345	21.86%
Not found out	101	6.4%
Total	1578	

In year 2021 was 1578 people by ethnicity 1222 as Hungarian, 345 as Slovak, 101 as Not found out, 7 as Romani, 3 as Czech, 2 as German, 2 as Albanian, 1 as Italian, 1 as Serbian and 1 as English.

Note on population: The difference values of population numbers in the table "Population statistic" and in the sections "Ethnicity" & "Religion" is caused by the use of various statistical methods.

=== Religion ===
Census 2021 (1+ %)
Religion	Number	Fraction
Roman Catholic Church	1120	70.98%
None	284	18%
Not found out	74	4.69%
Evangelical Church	53	3.36%
Christian Congregations in Slovakia	17	1.08%
Greek Catholic Church	16	1.01%
Total	1578	

In year 2021 was 1578 people by religion 1120 from Roman Catholic Church, 284 from None, 74 from Not found out, 53 from Evangelical Church, 17 from Christian Congregations in Slovakia, 16 from Greek Catholic Church, 5 from Calvinist Church, 2 from Old Catholic Church, 2 from United Methodist Church, 2 from Apostolic Church, 1 from Jewish community, 1 from Eastern Orthodox Church and 1 from Other.
