= Hoste, Galanta District =

Hoste Kisgeszt
- Municipality
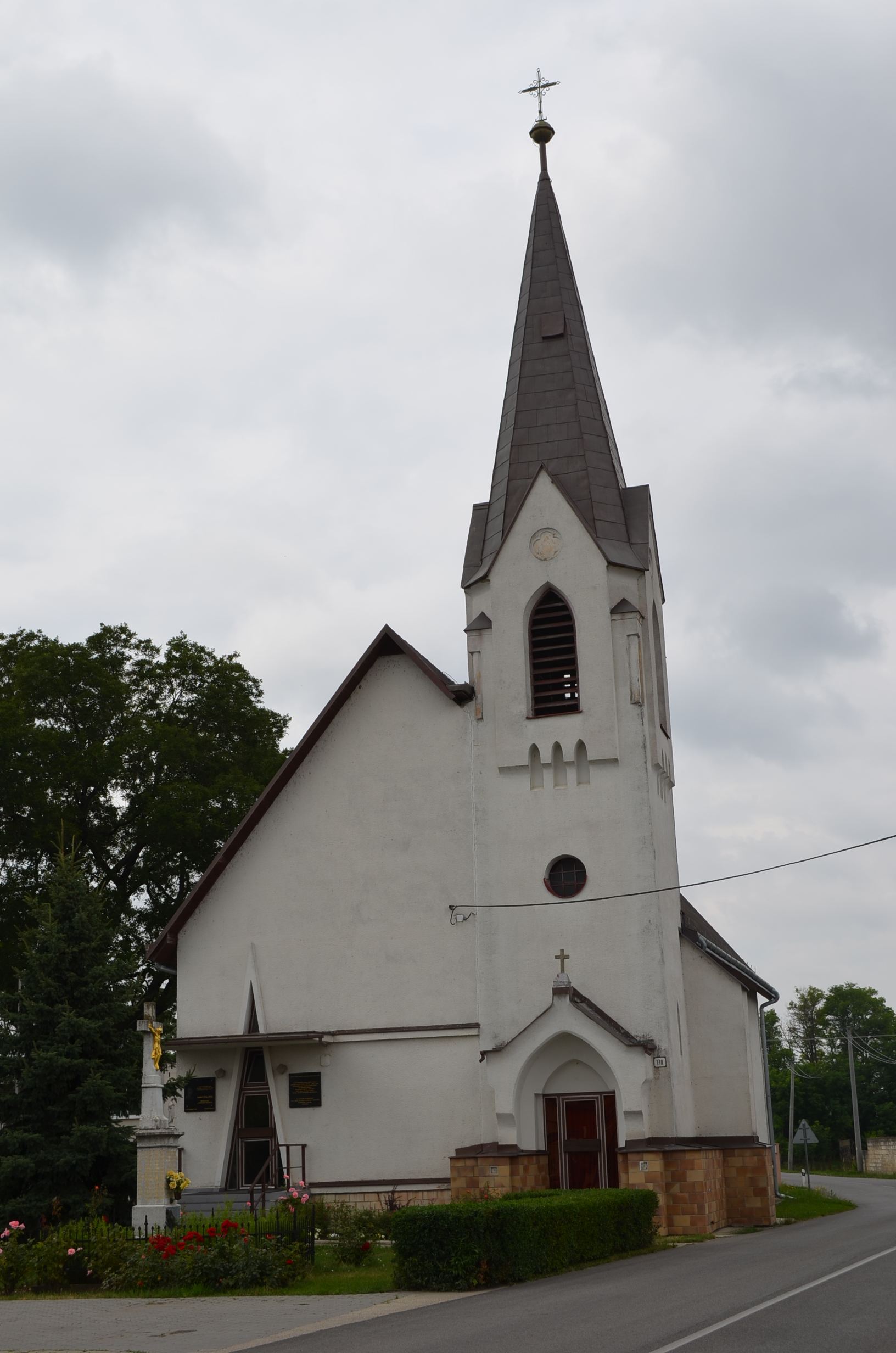

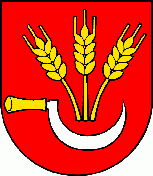
- Flag Coat of arms

- Location of Hoste in the Trnava Region Location of Hoste in Slovakia
- Coordinates: 48°16′N 17°38′E
- Country: Slovakia
- Region: Trnava Region
- District: Galanta District
- First mentioned: 1231

Area
  - Total: 4.48 km^{2} (1.73 sq mi)
- Elevation: 125 m (410 ft)

Population (2025)
  - Total: 443
- Time zone: UTC+1 (CET)
  - Summer (DST): UTC+2 (CEST)
- Postal code: 925 45
- Area code: +421 31
- Vehicle registration plate (until 2022): GA
- Website: hoste-obec.sk

Hoste (Hungarian: Kisgeszt) is a village and municipality in Galanta District of the Trnava Region of south-west Slovakia.

== History ==
In historical records the village was first mentioned in 1231. Before the establishment of independent Czechoslovakia in 1918, it was part of Pozsony County within the Kingdom of Hungary.

== Geography ==
The municipality lies at an altitude of 125 metres (410 ft) and covers an area of 4.48 km^{2} (1.73 sq mi) (2025).

== Population ==
Population statistic (10 years)
Year	1995	2005	2015	2025
Count	491	503	477	443
Difference		+2.44%	−5.16%	−7.12%

Population statistic
Year	2024	2025
Count	431	443
Difference		+2.78%

It has a population of 443 people (31 December 2025).

=== Ethnicity ===
Census 2021 (1+ %)
Ethnicity	Number	Fraction
Slovak	421	96.33%
Not found out	14	3.2%
Total	437	

In year 2021 was 437 people by ethnicity 421 as Slovak, 14 as Not found out, 4 as Hungarian, 3 as Czech, 1 as Moravian, 1 as Canadian and 1 as English.

Note on population: The difference values of population numbers in the table "Population statistic" and in the sections "Ethnicity" & "Religion" is caused by the use of various statistical methods.

=== Religion ===
Census 2021 (1+ %)
Religion	Number	Fraction
Roman Catholic Church	342	78.26%
None	51	11.67%
Not found out	13	2.97%
Evangelical Church	13	2.97%
Total	437	

In year 2021 was 437 people by religion 342 from Roman Catholic Church, 51 from None, 13 from Not found out, 13 from Evangelical Church, 4 from Other and not ascertained christian church, 4 from Buddhism, 3 from Calvinist Church, 3 from Christian Congregations in Slovakia, 2 from Other, 1 from Greek Catholic Church and 1 from Ad hoc movements.

== Genealogical resources ==
The records for genealogical research are available at the state archive "Statny Archiv in Bratislava, Slovakia"

- Roman Catholic church records (births/marriages/deaths): 1688-1895 (parish B)
- Lutheran church records (births/marriages/deaths): 1701-1896 (parish B)

== See also ==
- List of municipalities and towns in Slovakia
