= Šalgočka =

- Municipality
- Flag

- Location of Šalgočka in the Trnava Region Location of Šalgočka in Slovakia
- Coordinates: 48.33°N 17.82°E
- Country: Slovakia
- Region: Trnava Region
- District: Galanta District
- First mentioned: 1248

Area
  - Total: 4.74 km^{2} (1.83 sq mi)
- Elevation: 151 m (495 ft)

Population (2025)
  - Total: 468
- Time zone: UTC+1 (CET)
  - Summer (DST): UTC+2 (CEST)
- Postal code: 925 54
- Area code: +421 31
- Vehicle registration plate (until 2022): GA
- Website: www.salgocka.sk

Šalgočka (Hungarian: Salgócska) is a village and municipality in Galanta District of the Trnava Region of south-west Slovakia.

== History ==
In historical records the village was first mentioned in 1248. Before the establishment of independent Czechoslovakia in 1918, it was part of Nyitra County within the Kingdom of Hungary.

== Geography ==
The municipality lies at an altitude of 151 metres (495 ft) and covers an area of 4.74 km^{2} (1.83 sq mi) (2025).

== Population ==
Population statistic (10 years)
Year	1995	2005	2015	2025
Count	389	460	449	468
Difference		+18.25%	−2.39%	+4.23%

Population statistic
Year	2024	2025
Count	472	468
Difference		−0.84%

It has a population of 468 people (31 December 2025).

=== Ethnicity ===
Census 2021 (1+ %)
Ethnicity	Number	Fraction
Slovak	446	95.91%
Not found out	14	3.01%
Total	465	

In year 2021 was 465 people by ethnicity 446 as Slovak, 14 as Not found out, 4 as Hungarian, 3 as Romani, 2 as German, 2 as Other, 2 as English, 1 as Czech and 1 as Romanian.

Note on population: The difference values of population numbers in the table "Population statistic" and in the sections "Ethnicity" & "Religion" is caused by the use of various statistical methods.

=== Religion ===
Census 2021 (1+ %)
Religion	Number	Fraction
Roman Catholic Church	334	71.83%
None	99	21.29%
Not found out	15	3.23%
Evangelical Church	8	1.72%
Christian Congregations in Slovakia	6	1.29%
Total	465	

In year 2021 was 465 people by religion 334 from Roman Catholic Church, 99 from None, 15 from Not found out, 8 from Evangelical Church, 6 from Christian Congregations in Slovakia and 3 from Jewish community.
