= Dolný Chotár =

Dolný Chotár Alsóhatár
- Municipality
- Flag

- Location of Dolný Chotár in the Trnava Region Location of Dolný Chotár in Slovakia
- Coordinates: 48.00°N 17.87°E
- Country: Slovakia
- Region: Trnava Region
- District: Galanta District
- First mentioned: 1960

Government
  - Mayor: Ferenc Dora

Area
  - Total: 13.88 km^{2} (5.36 sq mi)
- Elevation: 110 m (360 ft)

Population (2025)
  - Total: 359
- Time zone: UTC+1 (CET)
  - Summer (DST): UTC+2 (CEST)
- Postal code: 925 41
- Area code: +421 31
- Vehicle registration plate (until 2022): GA
- Website: www.dolnychotar.sk

Dolný Chotár (Hungarian: Alsóhatár) is a village and municipality in Galanta District of the Trnava Region of south-west Slovakia.

== Geography ==
The municipality lies at an altitude of 110 metres (360 ft) and covers an area of 13.88 km^{2} (5.36 sq mi) (2025).

== History ==
In the 9th century, the territory of Dolný Chotár became part of the Kingdom of Hungary. In historical records, the village was first mentioned in 1960. Before the establishment of independent Czechoslovakia in 1918, it was part of Pozsony County. After the Austro-Hungarian army disintegrated in November 1918, Czechoslovak troops occupied the area, later acknowledged internationally by the Treaty of Trianon. Between 1938 and 1945, Dolný Chotár once more became part of Miklós Horthy's Hungary through the First Vienna Award. From 1945 until the Velvet Divorce, it was part of Czechoslovakia. Since then, it has been part of Slovakia.

== Population ==
Population statistic (10 years)
Year	1995	2005	2015	2025
Count	222	203	411	359
Difference		−8.55%	+102.46%	−12.65%

Population statistic
Year	2024	2025
Count	344	359
Difference		+4.36%

It has a population of 359 people (31 December 2025).

=== Ethnic composition ===
Census 2021 (1+ %)
Ethnicity	Number	Fraction
Hungarian	180	49.86%
Slovak	177	49.03%
Not found out	13	3.6%
Total	361	

In year 2021 was 361 people by ethnicity 180 as Hungarian, 177 as Slovak, 13 as Not found out, 1 as Czech, 1 as Ukrainian and 1 as Serbian.

Note on population: The difference values of population numbers in the table "Population statistic" and in the sections "Ethnicity" & "Religion" is caused by the use of various statistical methods.

=== Religion ===
Census 2021 (1+ %)
Religion	Number	Fraction
Roman Catholic Church	153	42.38%
None	124	34.35%
Not found out	31	8.59%
Evangelical Church	30	8.31%
Christian Congregations in Slovakia	6	1.66%
Jehovah's Witnesses	5	1.39%
Calvinist Church	4	1.11%
Total	361	

In year 2021 was 361 people by religion 153 from Roman Catholic Church, 124 from None, 31 from Not found out, 30 from Evangelical Church, 6 from Christian Congregations in Slovakia, 5 from Jehovah's Witnesses, 4 from Calvinist Church, 3 from Greek Catholic Church, 2 from Baptists Church, 1 from Other and not ascertained christian church, 1 from Islam and 1 from Other.
