= Pusté Sady =

- Municipality
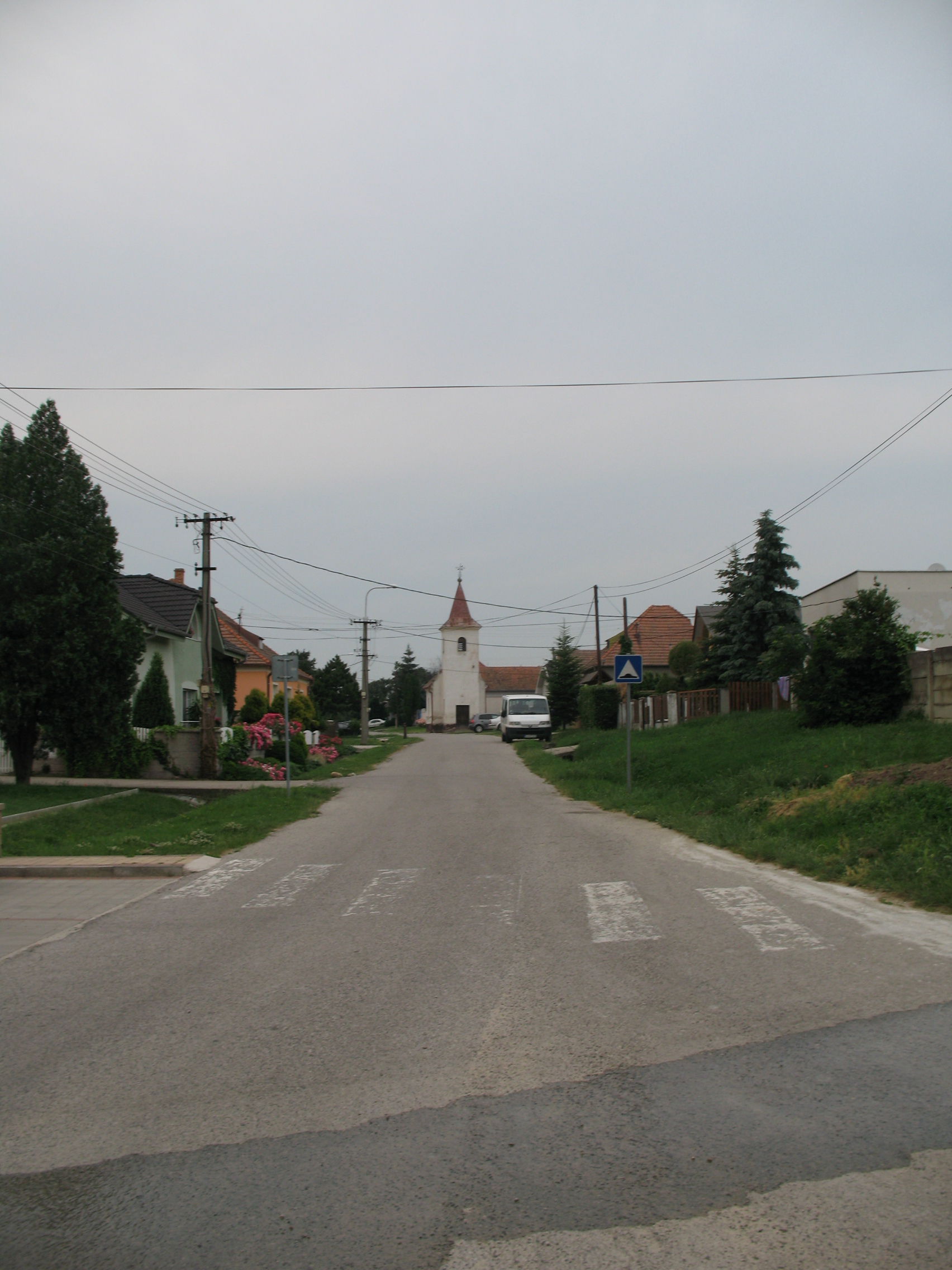

- Flag

- Location of Pusté Sady in the Trnava Region Location of Pusté Sady in Slovakia
- Coordinates: 48.32°N 17.83°E
- Country: Slovakia
- Region: Trnava Region
- District: Galanta District
- First mentioned: 1352

Area
  - Total: 8.03 km^{2} (3.10 sq mi)
- Elevation: 135 m (443 ft)

Population (2025)
  - Total: 600
- Time zone: UTC+1 (CET)
  - Summer (DST): UTC+2 (CEST)
- Postal code: 925 54
- Area code: +421 31
- Vehicle registration plate (until 2022): GA
- Website: obecpustesady.sk

Pusté Sady (Hungarian: Pusztakürt) is a village and municipality in Galanta District of the Trnava Region of south-west Slovakia.

== History ==
In historical records the village was first mentioned in 1352. Before the establishment of independent Czechoslovakia in 1918, it was part of Nyitra County within the Kingdom of Hungary.

== Geography ==
The municipality lies at an altitude of 135 metres (443 ft) and covers an area of 8.03 km^{2} (3.10 sq mi) (2025).

== Population ==
Population statistic (10 years)
Year	1995	2005	2015	2025
Count	617	627	588	600
Difference		+1.62%	−6.22%	+2.04%

Population statistic
Year	2024	2025
Count	601	600
Difference		−0.16%

It has a population of 600 people (31 December 2025).

=== Ethnicity ===
Census 2021 (1+ %)
Ethnicity	Number	Fraction
Slovak	579	95.7%
Not found out	20	3.3%
Total	605	

In year 2021 was 605 people by ethnicity 579 as Slovak, 20 as Not found out, 4 as Hungarian, 3 as Czech, 3 as Polish, 2 as Italian, 2 as Romanian, 1 as Romani, 1 as Rusyn and 1 as Other.

Note on population: The difference values of population numbers in the table "Population statistic" and in the sections "Ethnicity" & "Religion" is caused by the use of various statistical methods.

=== Religion ===
Census 2021 (1+ %)
Religion	Number	Fraction
Roman Catholic Church	489	80.83%
None	80	13.22%
Not found out	17	2.81%
Evangelical Church	8	1.32%
Total	605	

In year 2021 was 605 people by religion 489 from Roman Catholic Church, 80 from None, 17 from Not found out, 8 from Evangelical Church, 2 from Other, 2 from Greek Catholic Church, 2 from Apostolic Church, 1 from Calvinist Church, 1 from Eastern Orthodox Church, 1 from Christian Congregations in Slovakia, 1 from Church of Jesus Christ of Latter-day Saints and 1 from Ad hoc movements.
