= Vozokany, Galanta District =

Vozokany Pozsonyvezekény
- Municipality
- Flag

- Location of Vozokany in the Trnava Region Location of Vozokany in Slovakia
- Coordinates: 48°06′24″N 17°41′11″E
- Country: Slovakia
- Region: Trnava Region
- District: Galanta District
- First mentioned: 1240

Area
  - Total: 12.89 km^{2} (4.98 sq mi)
- Elevation: 115 m (377 ft)

Population (2025)
  - Total: 1,072
- Time zone: UTC+1 (CET)
  - Summer (DST): UTC+2 (CEST)
- Postal code: 925 05
- Area code: +421 31
- Vehicle registration plate (until 2022): GA
- Website: www.obecvozokany.sk

Vozokany (Hungarian: Pozsonyvezekény) is a village and municipality in Galanta District of the Trnava Region of south-west Slovakia.

== Geography ==
The municipality lies at an altitude of 115 metres (377 ft) and covers an area of 12.89 km^{2} (4.98 sq mi) (2025).

== History ==
In the 9th century, the territory of Vozokany became part of the Kingdom of Hungary. In historical records the village was first mentioned in 1240. Before the establishment of independent Czechoslovakia in 1918, it was part of Pozsony County. After the Austro-Hungarian army disintegrated in November 1918, Czechoslovak troops occupied the area, later acknowledged internationally by the Treaty of Trianon. Between 1938 and 1945 Vozokany once more became part of Miklós Horthy's Hungary through the First Vienna Award. From 1945 until the Velvet Divorce, it was part of Czechoslovakia. Since then it has been part of Slovakia.

== Population ==
Population statistic (10 years)
Year	1995	2005	2015	2025
Count	1093	1117	1170	1072
Difference		+2.19%	+4.74%	−8.37%

Population statistic
Year	2024	2025
Count	1089	1072
Difference		−1.56%

It has a population of 1072 people (31 December 2025).

=== Ethnicity ===
Census 2021 (1+ %)
Ethnicity	Number	Fraction
Hungarian	826	73.68%
Slovak	289	25.78%
Not found out	50	4.46%
Romani	14	1.24%
Total	1121	

In year 2021 was 1121 people by ethnicity 826 as Hungarian, 289 as Slovak, 50 as Not found out, 14 as Romani, 6 as Czech, 2 as English and 1 as Ukrainian.

Note on population: The difference values of population numbers in the table "Population statistic" and in the sections "Ethnicity" & "Religion" is caused by the use of various statistical methods.

=== Religion ===
Census 2021 (1+ %)
Religion	Number	Fraction
Roman Catholic Church	784	69.94%
None	215	19.18%
Not found out	64	5.71%
Evangelical Church	28	2.5%
Total	1121	

In year 2021 was 1121 people by religion 784 from Roman Catholic Church, 215 from None, 64 from Not found out, 28 from Evangelical Church, 10 from Calvinist Church, 6 from Greek Catholic Church, 4 from Christian Congregations in Slovakia, 2 from Old Catholic Church, 2 from Eastern Orthodox Church, 2 from United Methodist Church, 2 from Buddhism, 1 from Other and not ascertained christian church and 1 from Other.
