= Jánovce, Galanta District =

Jánovce Dunajánosháza
- Municipality
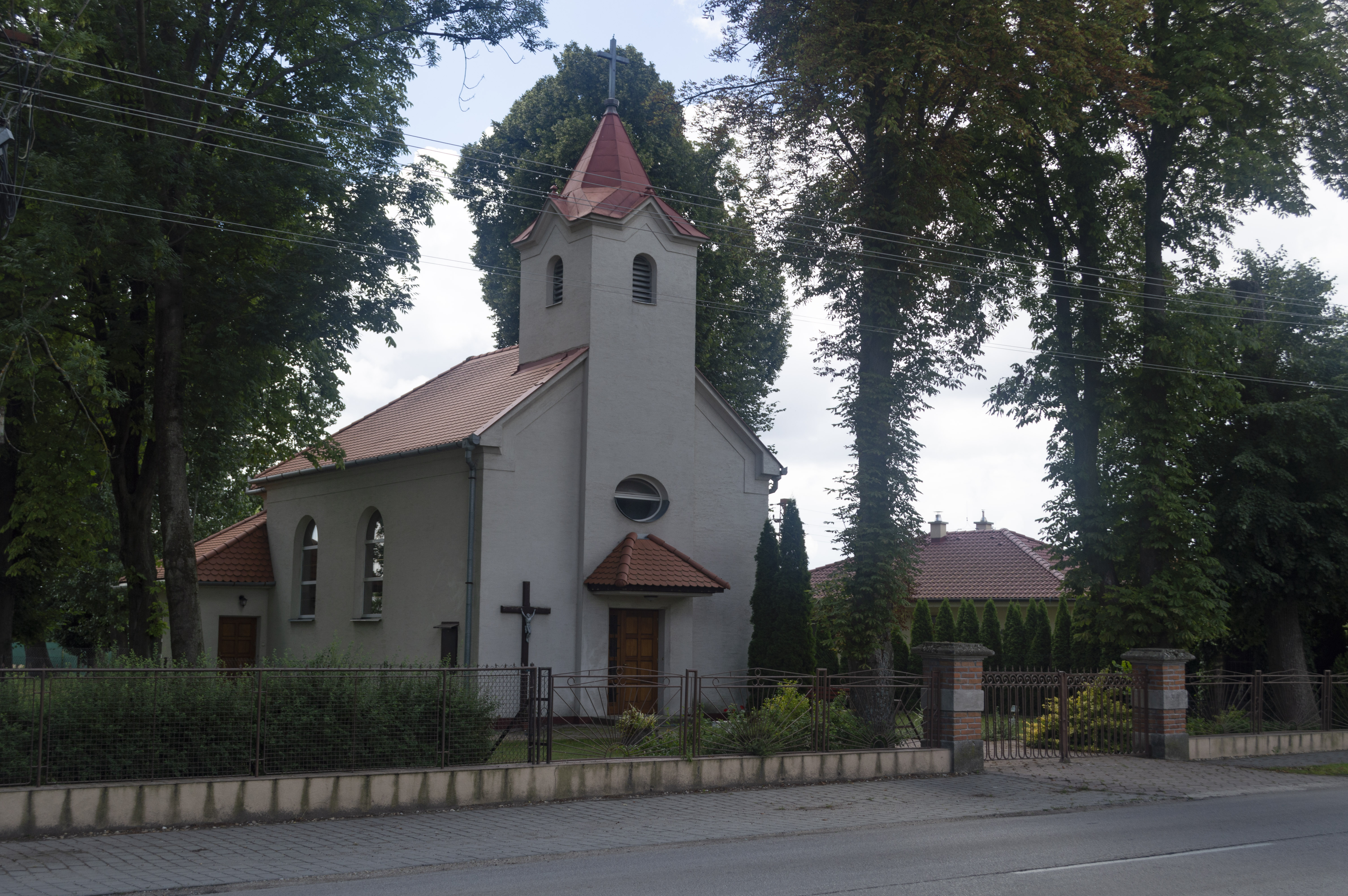

- Flag

- Location of Jánovce in the Trnava Region Location of Jánovce in Slovakia
- Coordinates: 49.02°N 20.43°E
- Country: Slovakia
- Region: Trnava Region
- District: Galanta District
- First mentioned: 1792

Area
  - Total: 2.84 km^{2} (1.10 sq mi)
- Elevation: 120 m (390 ft)

Population (2025)
  - Total: 527
- Time zone: UTC+1 (CET)
  - Summer (DST): UTC+2 (CEST)
- Postal code: 925 22
- Area code: +421 31
- Vehicle registration plate (until 2022): GA
- Website: www.janovce.sk

Jánovce (Hungarian: Dunajánosháza, known colloquially as Jánosháza) is a village and municipality in Galanta District of the Trnava Region of south-west Slovakia. It has a population of about 449 people.

== History ==
In historical records the village was first mentioned in 1792. Before the establishment of independent Czechoslovakia in 1918, it was part of Pozsony County within the Kingdom of Hungary.

== Geography ==
The municipality lies at an altitude of 120 metres (390 ft) and covers an area of 2.84 km^{2} (1.10 sq mi) (2025).

== Population ==
Population statistic (10 years)
Year	1995	2005	2015	2025
Count	431	463	487	527
Difference		+7.42%	+5.18%	+8.21%

Population statistic
Year	2024	2025
Count	515	527
Difference		+2.33%

It has a population of 527 people (31 December 2025).

=== Ethnicity ===
Census 2021 (1+ %)
Ethnicity	Number	Fraction
Slovak	390	79.26%
Hungarian	102	20.73%
Not found out	10	2.03%
Ukrainian	5	1.01%
Total	492	

In year 2021 was 492 people by ethnicity 390 as Slovak, 102 as Hungarian, 10 as Not found out, 5 as Ukrainian, 4 as Other, 2 as Czech, 2 as Romani, 1 as Serbian, 1 as German and 1 as Albanian.

Note on population: The difference values of population numbers in the table "Population statistic" and in the sections "Ethnicity" & "Religion" is caused by the use of various statistical methods.

=== Religion ===
Census 2021 (1+ %)
Religion	Number	Fraction
Roman Catholic Church	284	57.72%
None	133	27.03%
Evangelical Church	36	7.32%
Not found out	19	3.86%
Greek Catholic Church	6	1.22%
Total	492	

In year 2021 was 492 people by religion 284 from Roman Catholic Church, 133 from None, 36 from Evangelical Church, 19 from Not found out, 6 from Greek Catholic Church, 3 from Christian Congregations in Slovakia, 3 from Islam, 2 from Eastern Orthodox Church, 2 from Other and not ascertained christian church, 1 from Old Catholic Church, 1 from Calvinist Church, 1 from Other and 1 from Buddhism.
