= Little Danube =

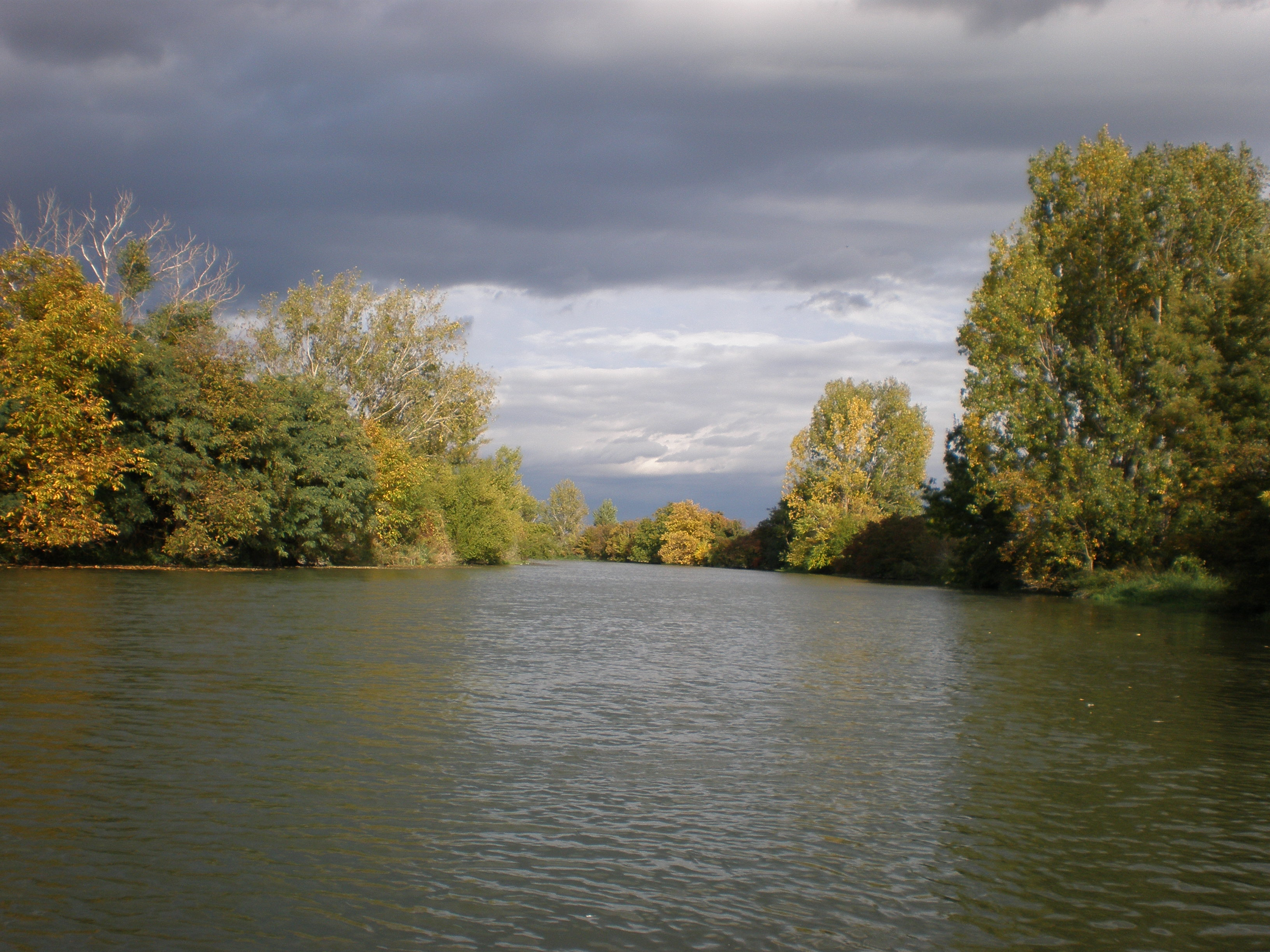
- Malý Dunaj river near Zálesie

Location
- Country: Slovakia

Physical characteristics
- Mouth: Váh
  - coordinates: 47°55′44″N 18°00′04″E
- Length: 137 km (85 mi)
- Basin size: 2,977 km^{2} (1,149 sq mi)

Basin features
- Progression: Váh→ Danube→ Black Sea
- Tributaries
  - left: Čierna voda

The Little Danube (Slovak: Malý Dunaj, Hungarian: Kis-Duna, German: Kleine Donau) is a branch of the river Danube in Slovakia.

It splits from the main river in Bratislava, and flows more or less parallel to the Danube until it flows into the river Váh in Kolárovo. It is 137 km (85 mi) long and its basin size is 2,977 km^{2} (1,149 sq mi).

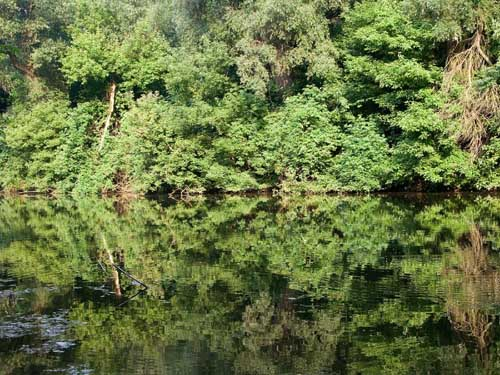
Little Danube

The part of the Váh between Kolárovo and its confluence with the Danube in Komárno is also called Váh Danube (Slovak: Vážsky Dunaj, Hungarian: Vág-Duna). The island between the Danube, the Little Danube and the Váh Danube rivers is Žitný ostrov.
