= Vinohrady nad Váhom =

- Municipality
- Flag

- Location of Vinohrady nad Váhom in the Trnava Region Location of Vinohrady nad Váhom in Slovakia
- Coordinates: 48.31°N 17.76°E
- Country: Slovakia
- Region: Trnava Region
- District: Galanta District
- First mentioned: 1958

Area
  - Total: 10.69 km^{2} (4.13 sq mi)
- Elevation: 166 m (545 ft)

Population (2025)
  - Total: 1,663
- Time zone: UTC+1 (CET)
  - Summer (DST): UTC+2 (CEST)
- Postal code: 925 55
- Area code: +421 31
- Vehicle registration plate (until 2022): GA
- Website: www.vinohradynadvahom.eu

Vinohrady nad Váhom (Hungarian: Szentharaszt) is a village and municipality in Galanta District of the Trnava Region of south-west Slovakia.

== History ==
In historical records the village was first mentioned in 1958. Before the establishment of independent Czechoslovakia in 1918, it was part of Nyitra County within the Kingdom of Hungary.

== Geography ==
The municipality lies at an altitude of 166 metres (545 ft) and covers an area of 10.69 km^{2} (4.13 sq mi) (2025).

== Population ==
Population statistic (10 years)
Year	1995	2005	2015	2025
Count	1436	1524	1570	1663
Difference		+6.12%	+3.01%	+5.92%

Population statistic
Year	2024	2025
Count	1678	1663
Difference		−0.89%

It has a population of 1663 people (31 December 2025).

=== Ethnicity ===
Census 2021 (1+ %)
Ethnicity	Number	Fraction
Slovak	1543	93.12%
Not found out	96	5.79%
Total	1657	

In year 2021 was 1657 people by ethnicity 1543 as Slovak, 96 as Not found out, 15 as Czech, 6 as Hungarian, 5 as Italian, 3 as German, 2 as Turkish, 2 as Rusyn, 2 as Russian, 2 as Korean, 2 as Other, 1 as Serbian, 1 as Austrian and 1 as Greek.

Note on population: The difference values of population numbers in the table "Population statistic" and in the sections "Ethnicity" & "Religion" is caused by the use of various statistical methods.

=== Religion ===
Census 2021 (1+ %)
Religion	Number	Fraction
Roman Catholic Church	1072	64.7%
None	422	25.47%
Not found out	94	5.67%
Total	1657	

In year 2021 was 1657 people by religion 1072 from Roman Catholic Church, 422 from None, 94 from Not found out, 14 from Other and not ascertained christian church, 10 from Evangelical Church, 9 from Greek Catholic Church, 9 from Apostolic Church, 7 from Other, 4 from Calvinist Church, 3 from Paganism and natural spirituality, 3 from Christian Congregations in Slovakia, 3 from Buddhism, 2 from Eastern Orthodox Church, 2 from Ad hoc movements, 1 from Hinduism, 1 from United Methodist Church and 1 from Baptists Church.
