= Čierna Voda =

Čierna Voda Feketenyék
- Municipality
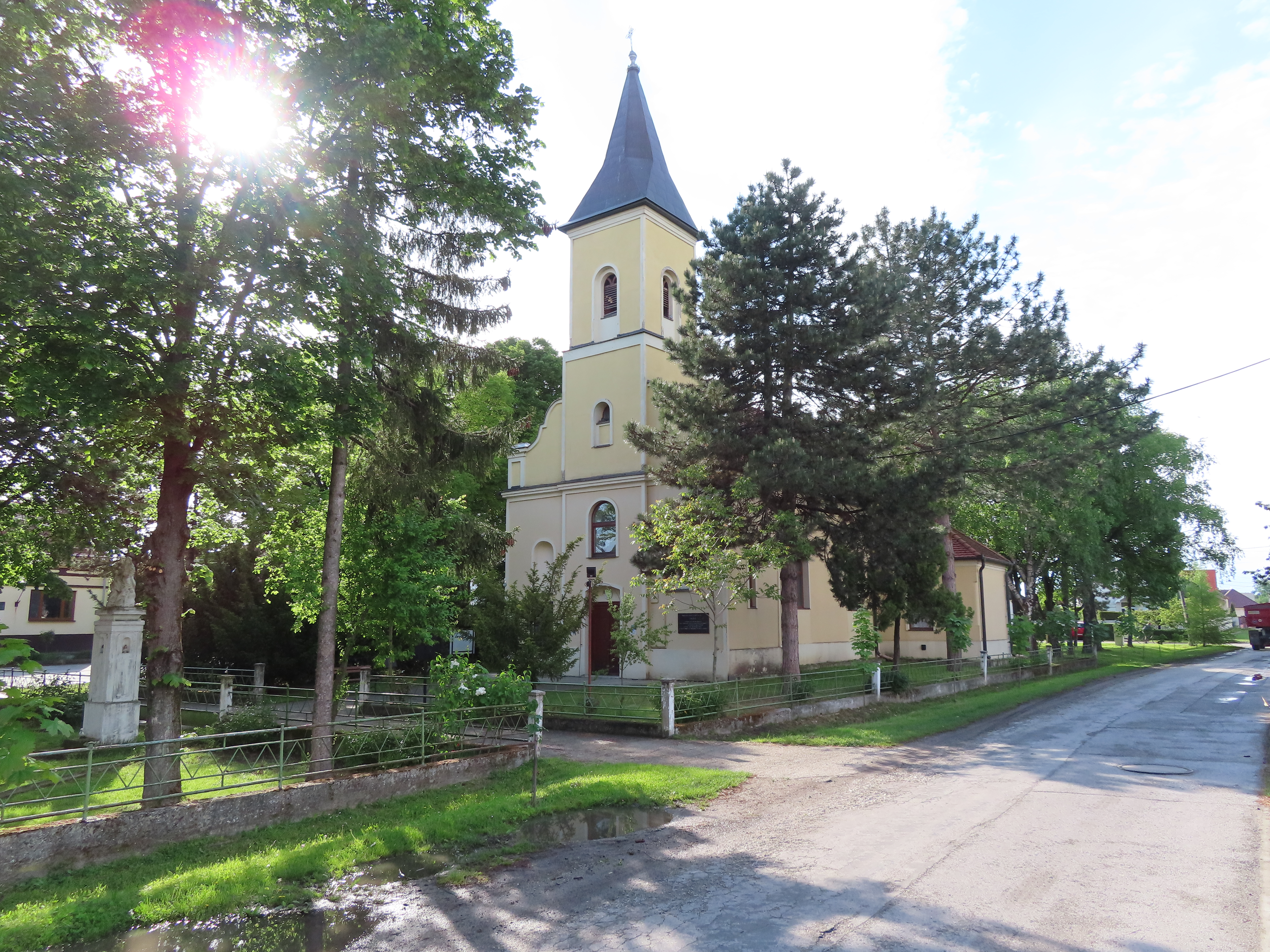

- Flag

- Location of Čierna Voda in the Trnava Region Location of Čierna Voda in Slovakia
- Coordinates: 48.13°N 17.65°E
- Country: Slovakia
- Region: Trnava Region
- District: Galanta District
- First mentioned: 1217

Government
  - Mayor: Zsuzsanna Csady

Area
  - Total: 12.14 km^{2} (4.69 sq mi)
- Elevation: 117 m (384 ft)

Population (2025)
  - Total: 1,391
- Time zone: UTC+1 (CET)
  - Summer (DST): UTC+2 (CEST)
- Postal code: 925 06
- Area code: +421 31
- Vehicle registration plate (until 2022): GA
- Website: www.ciernavoda-nyek.sk

Čierna Voda (Hungarian: Feketenyék) is a village and municipality in Galanta District of the Trnava Region of southwest Slovakia.

== Geography ==
The municipality lies at an altitude of 117 metres (384 ft) and covers an area of 12.14 km^{2} (4.69 sq mi) (2025).

== History ==
In the 9th century, the territory of Čierna Voda became part of the Kingdom of Hungary. In historical records the village was first mentioned in 1217. Before the establishment of independent Czechoslovakia in 1918, it was part of Pozsony County. After the Austro-Hungarian army disintegrated in November 1918, Czechoslovak troops occupied the area, later acknowledged internationally by the Treaty of Trianon. Between 1938 and 1945 Čierna Voda once more became part of Miklós Horthy's Hungary through the First Vienna Award. From 1945 until the Velvet Divorce, it was part of Czechoslovakia. Since then it has been part of Slovakia.

== Population ==
Population statistic (10 years)
Year	1995	2005	2015	2025
Count	1313	1411	1387	1391
Difference		+7.46%	−1.70%	+0.28%

Population statistic
Year	2024	2025
Count	1397	1391
Difference		−0.42%

It has a population of 1391 people (31 December 2025).

=== Ethnicity ===
Census 2021 (1+ %)
Ethnicity	Number	Fraction
Hungarian	1163	81.67%
Slovak	289	20.29%
Not found out	36	2.52%
Total	1424	

In year 2021 was 1424 people by ethnicity 1163 as Hungarian, 289 as Slovak, 36 as Not found out, 4 as Other, 4 as Croatian, 2 as Polish, 1 as Romani, 1 as Austrian and 1 as German.

Note on population: The difference values of population numbers in the table "Population statistic" and in the sections "Ethnicity" & "Religion" is caused by the use of various statistical methods.

=== Religion ===
Census 2021 (1+ %)
Religion	Number	Fraction
Roman Catholic Church	1217	85.46%
None	133	9.34%
Not found out	35	2.46%
Total	1424	

In year 2021 was 1424 people by religion 1217 from Roman Catholic Church, 133 from None, 35 from Not found out, 12 from Calvinist Church, 12 from Evangelical Church, 7 from Greek Catholic Church, 4 from Christian Congregations in Slovakia, 3 from Other and not ascertained christian church and 1 from Buddhism.

== Genealogical resources ==
The records for genealogical research are available at the state archive "Statny Archiv in Bratislava, Slovakia"

- Roman Catholic church records (births/marriages/deaths): 1777-1892 (parish B)

== See also ==
- List of municipalities and towns in Slovakia
