= Galanta District =

Coordinates: 48°11′22″N 17°43′36″E

- District
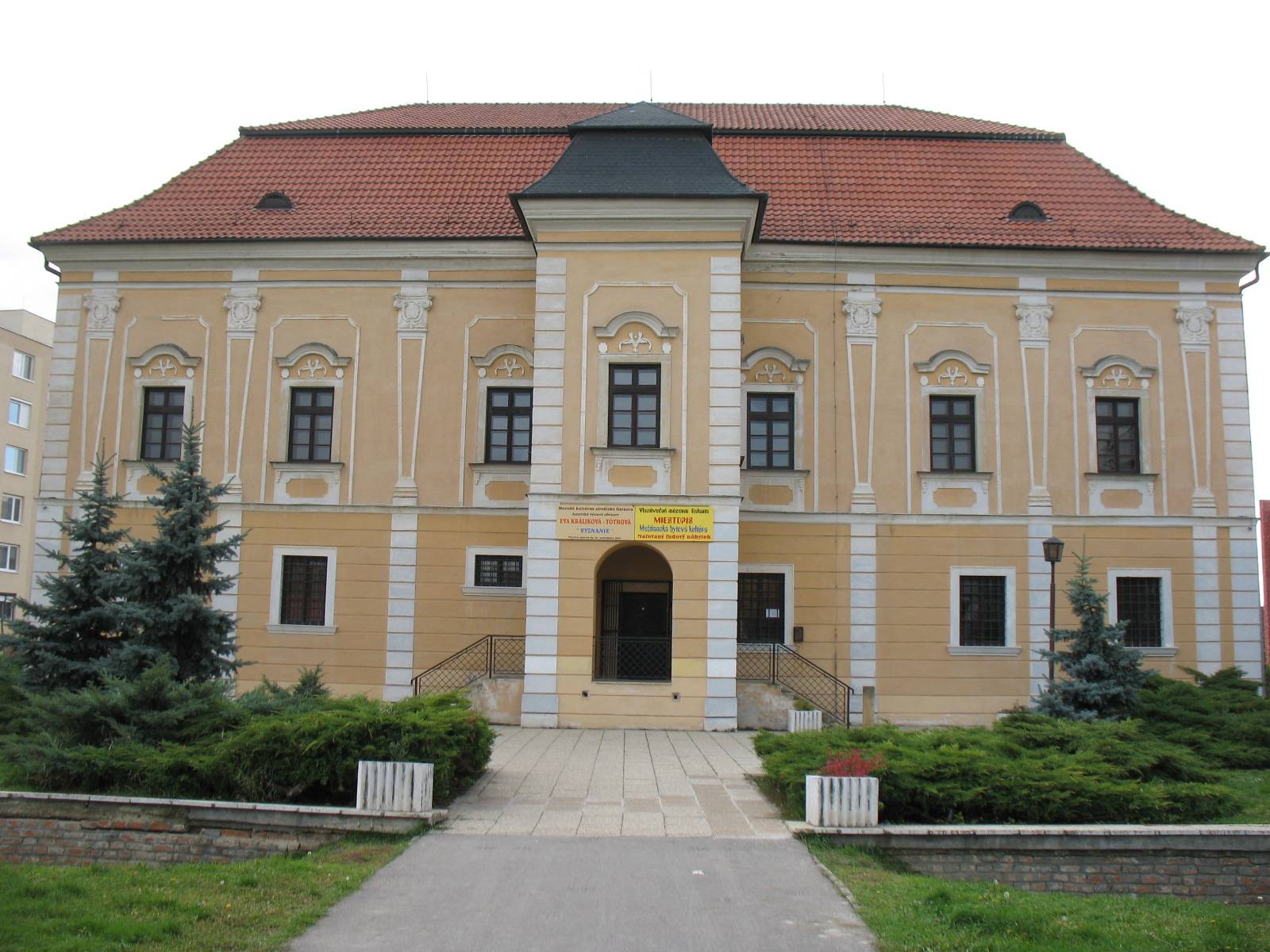
- Country: Slovakia
- Region (kraj): Trnava Region
- Seat: Galanta

Area
  - Total: 641.70 km^{2} (247.76 sq mi)

Population (2025)
  - Total: 95,106
- Time zone: UTC+1 (CET)
  - Summer (DST): UTC+2 (CEST)
- Telephone prefix: 031
- Vehicle registration plate (until 2022): GA
- Municipalities: 36

Galanta District (Slovak: okres Galanta) is a district in the Trnava Region of western Slovakia. The district lies on the lowland area. Through the district area flows river Váh and its level is regulated by the Kráľová reservoir.

Historically the economy of the district area had relied on agriculture, now the production of white goods is of utmost importance. The district center is its largest town Galanta and there are 36 municipalities, in three of them are towns.

The Hungarian composer, Zoltán Kodály, spent most of his childhood in Galanta and composed the Dances of Galánta (1933, for orchestra) based on the folk music of this region.

== Population ==
Population statistic (10 years)
Year	1995	2005	2015	2025
Count	93,808	95,004	93,776	95,106
Difference		+1.27%	−1.29%	+1.41%

Population statistic
Year	2024	2025
Count	95,210	95,106
Difference		−0.10%

It has a population of 95,106 people (31 December 2025).

Historical population
Year	Pop.	±%
1970	88,257	—
1980	92,003	+4.2%
1991	92,645	+0.7%
2001	94,533	+2.0%
2011	93,594	−1.0%
2021	95,124	+1.6%
Source: Statistical Office of the Slovak Republic

=== Ethnicity ===
Census 2021 (1+ %)
Ethnicity	Number	Fraction
Slovak	61,356	61.67%
Hungarian	30,951	31.11%
Not found out	5093	5.11%
Total	99,487	

In year 2021 was 99,487 people by ethnicity 61,356 as Slovak, 30,951 as Hungarian, 5093 as Not found out, 539 as Czech, 496 as Romani, 219 as Other, 111 as Romanian, 94 as Russian, 94 as German, 89 as Vietnamese, 75 as Ukrainian, 61 as Rusyn, 48 as Polish, 43 as Serbian, 37 as Jewish, 34 as English, 33 as Italian, 19 as Moravian, 18 as Austrian, 18 as Croatian, 14 as Bulgarian, 13 as Korean, 7 as Greek, 7 as Albanian, 6 as French, 4 as Irish, 4 as Turkish, 3 as Canadian and 1 as Chinese.

Note on population: The difference values of population numbers in the table "Population statistic" and in the sections "Ethnicity" & "Religion" is caused by the use of various statistical methods.

=== Religion ===
Census 2021 (1+ %)
Religion	Number	Fraction
Roman Catholic Church	57,538	60.49%
None	24,706	25.97%
Not found out	5498	5.78%
Evangelical Church	3823	4.02%
Total	95,124	

In year 2021 was 95,124 people by religion 57,538 from Roman Catholic Church, 24,706 from None, 5498 from Not found out, 3823 from Evangelical Church, 660 from Calvinist Church, 620 from Greek Catholic Church, 529 from Christian Congregations in Slovakia, 253 from Apostolic Church, 222 from Other and not ascertained christian church, 214 from Other, 198 from Ad hoc movements, 172 from United Methodist Church, 159 from Jehovah's Witnesses, 138 from Eastern Orthodox Church, 100 from Buddhism, 53 from Islam, 52 from Paganism and natural spirituality, 49 from Jewish community, 44 from Old Catholic Church, 43 from Baptists Church, 26 from Seventh-day Adventist Church, 15 from Hinduism, 4 from Church of Jesus Christ of Latter-day Saints, 3 from Czechoslovak Hussite Church, 3 from Bahá'i Community and 2 from Church of the Brethren.

== Municipalities ==
Municipality	Area [km^{2}]	Population
Abrahám	15.77	1,094
Čierna Voda	12.14	1,391
Čierny Brod	17.69	1,613
Dolná Streda	13.23	1,766
Dolné Saliby	18.71	2,016
Dolný Chotár	13.88	359
Galanta	34.03	15,402
Gáň	6.17	864
Horné Saliby	34.83	3,152
Hoste	4.48	443
Jánovce	2.84	527
Jelka	32.65	3,998
Kajal	13.08	1,548
Košúty	14.72	1,958
Kráľov Brod	23.66	1,075
Malá Mača	0.00	587
Matúškovo	11.97	2,223
Mostová	25.15	1,576
Pata	17.62	3,262
Pusté Sady	8.03	600
Pusté Úľany	24.54	1,819
Sereď	30.72	14,946
Sládkovičovo	37.07	5,365
Šalgočka	4.74	468
Šintava	12.79	1,709
Šoporňa	31.22	4,018
Tomášikovo	21.13	1,824
Topoľnica	10.47	1,017
Trstice	20.26	3,814
Váhovce	15.71	2,000
Veľká Mača	14.81	2,554
Veľké Úľany	41.85	5,094
Veľký Grob	23.54	1,444
Vinohrady nad Váhom	10.69	1,663
Vozokany	12.89	1,072
Zemianske Sady	8.05	845

Population and area values are current for year 2025.
