= Battle of Pered =

1849 battle in the Hungarian War of Independence

Coordinates: 48°06′04.0″N 17°50′48.1″E

- Part of the Hungarian Revolution of 1848
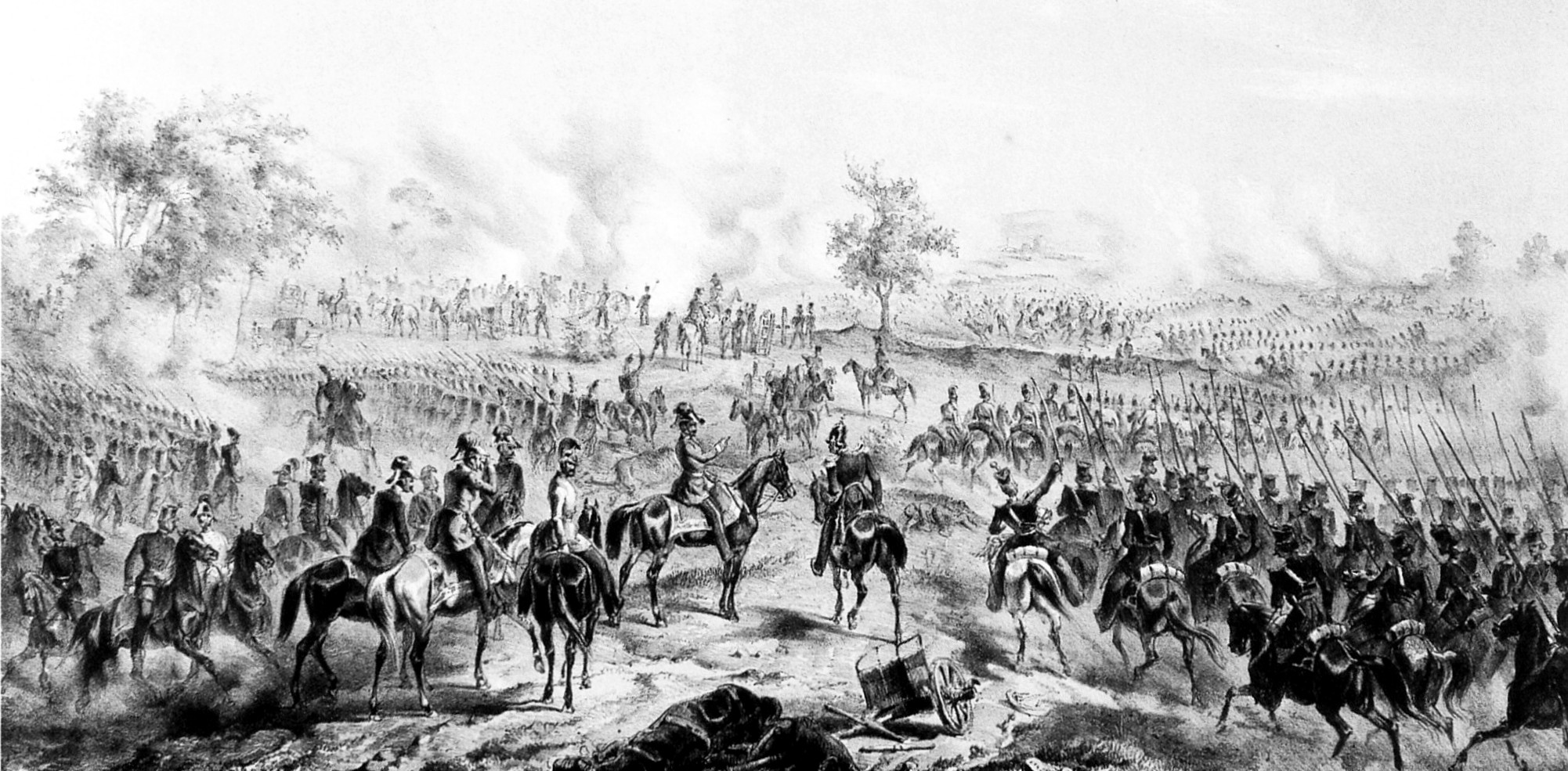
Date	20–21 June 1849
Location	around and in Pered Kingdom of Hungary (now Tešedíkovo, Slovakia)
Result	Austro-Russian victory

Belligerents
Hungarian Revolutionary Army	Austrian Empire; Russian Empire

Commanders and leaders
Artúr Görgei; Lajos Asbóth; Károly Leiningen-Westerburg; György Klapka	Ludwig von Wohlgemuth; Anton Csorich; Feodor Sergeyevich Panyutyin

Strength
Total: 25,286/23,727 men: II. corps: 8,059/6,500; III. corps: 9,395; VIII. corps: 7,832; 113 cannons Did not participate I. corps: 7261 men 30 cannons	Total: 39,500 men: II. corps: 13,500; IV. (reserve) corps: 14,000; Panyutyin division: 12,799; 172 cannons

Casualties and losses
Total: 2,878 men: 126 dead; 180 wounded; 2,572 missing and captured 7 cannons	Total: 668 men: 131 dead; 415 wounded; 122 missing and captured 260 cannons

The Battle of Pered, fought on 20–21 June 1849, was one of the battles which took place in the Summer Campaign of the Hungarian War of Independence from 1848 to 1849, fought between the Hungarian Revolutionary Army and the Habsburg Empire helped by Russian troops. The Hungarian army was led by General Artúr Görgei, while the imperial army was led by Lieutenant field marshal Julius Jacob von Haynau. After several preliminary minor battles of the Hungarian and Austrian troops along the Vág river, in which the attacking Hungarians could not achieve success, Görgei took the command of his troops, and after receiving reinforcements, on 20 June, put his troops to attack again towards West. Although the II. Hungarian army corps occupied in heavy fights the village of Pered, the other two corps (the III. and the VIII.) were unsuccessful, and could not advance. The angered Görgei removed the commander of the III. corps, General Károly Knezić because of his inactivity, and Colonel Lajos Asbóth, the commander of the II corps who, in contrast to Knezić, was the only commander who accomplished his duties. While Knezić's place was taken by Colonel Károly Leiningen-Westerburg, who was a great choice, Asbóth's place was taken by Colonel József Kászonyi, who was an explicitly bad choice. Haynau, who on the first day of the battle was moving the bulk of his troops to cross the Danube to start an attack on its southern bank, sent three of his corps, which were still on the northern bank, to repel the Hungarian forces. The two Austrian (II, IV) and one Russian (Fedor Panyutin's) corps started their attack on 21 June and forced the Hungarians to retreat from Pered and Zsigárd, which forced Görgei to order his troops to retreat from the battlefield.

== Background ==
Thanks to the victories of the Spring Campaign, the Hungarian Revolutionary Army liberated much of Hungary from the occupation of the numerically and technologically superior Habsburg armies and their Serbian, Romanian, and Croatian allies. The Hungarian army of Transylvania, led by Lieutenant General Józef Bem even managed to chase out from the province the first Russian intervention troops (7000 soldiers), which entered there in the winter of 1849. From the end of March the Austrian politicians and military leaders understood that the Habsburg Empire is incapable of crushing their revolution by relying on their strength. So, based on the Münchengrätz Agreements from 1833, according to which the Habsburg and Russian Empires and Prussia agreed to help each other if their sovereignty is threatened by a revolt or revolution, Austria decided to ask for Russian help against the Hungarian Revolution, although initially, they were reluctant to do that, because they were conscious that this will cause them a big loss of prestige. But the Hungarian victories of the Spring Campaign made the Habsburg government make this unwanted step, and on 21 April, they made the official help request from Russia, followed by the letter of the emperor Franz Joseph I of Austria to Tsar Nicholas I of Russia. In result the Tsar decided to send 200,000 Russian soldiers to Hungary, putting another 80,000 in reserve, to enter Hungary if their presence would be needed. Although the Hungarian Government led by Bertalan Szemere and Governor President Lajos Kossuth believed that the European nations would not allow Russia to intervene in Hungary, the European states and England agreed with Russian intervention to crush the Hungarian revolution, thus Lord Palmerston replied to the question of the Russian ambassador about the reaction of England to Russian intervention in Hungary, saying: Finish them quickly!, demanding that after they fulfilled their task to return in Russia immediately. Although England worried about Russian intervention in Hungary, its first concern was that the Russian Empire to not advance in the Balkans, and an important condition for this was a strong Habsburg Empire. So, an independent Hungary could have impeded England's world domination policy.

Meanwhile, after the capture of Buda General György Klapka, as the deputy minister of war, elaborated the plan for the Hungarian military actions for summer, called later the Summer Campaign. His plan was based on the inactivity of the main Hungarian army corps, stationed around the fortress of Komárom, in the case of a retreat, appointed as the concentration point of the Hungarian troops in the Hungarian capitals (Buda and Pest) and Miskolc, which were facing the main imperial forces under the command of Lieutenant Field Marshal Julius Jacob von Haynau, while the Hungarian troops from Transylvania and Southern Hungary had to accomplish so heavy tasks that could be achieved only after relentless military actions in two months. In the plan made by Klapka, the Russian military intervention was only faintly mentioned without taking any measure against it. This plan was rejected by many of the Hungarian commanders (Józef Bem, Lieutenant General Henryk Dembiński), who said that they would not obey it. The Hungarian commander-in-chief and War Minister General Artúr Görgei also protested against this plan, underlining that as the concentration point of the Hungarian troops instead of Miskolc, Komárom should be appointed, and because of the imminent threat of the Russian intervention, he saw that the only way still open to the Hungarian army was to deal a decisive blow to the main imperial army before the slowly moving Russian forces arrived. This would have forced Austria to enter talks, and offer some kind of settlement with the Hungarians.

Görgei planned to attack towards Pozsony and Vienna quickly before the main Russian army started its attack on the Eastern and Northern fronts against Hungary. To this end, he and his chief of the general staff, Lieutenant-Colonel József Bayer, created at end of May the Central Operational Bureau (Központi Hadműveleti Iroda), to coordinate the movements of the different units of the Hungarian main army corps gathered in the Western Front. Besides the troops which the Central Operational Bureau disposed of (I., II., III. and parts of the VIII. corps), on the Western Front was another army grouping to which the VII. corps from the Rába line, led by Ernő Poeltenberg (from 6 May Colonel and from 7 June General), and the garrison of Komárom (the VIII. corps) belonged, and this was led by Major General György Klapka, commander of the garrison of Komárom. Klapka refused to submit to the orders of the chief of the general staff József Bayer, acting independently.

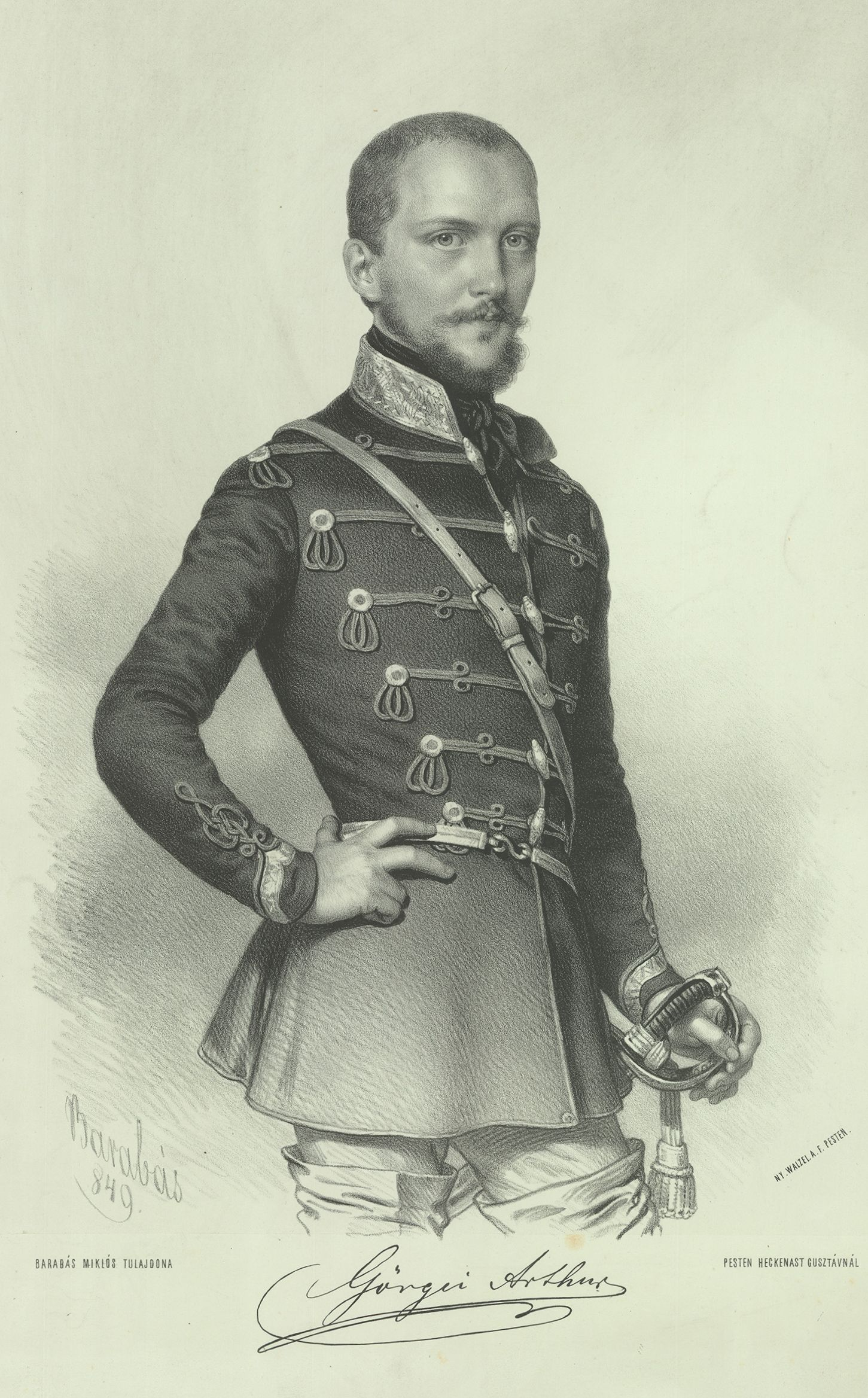
Görgey Artúr litográfia Barabás

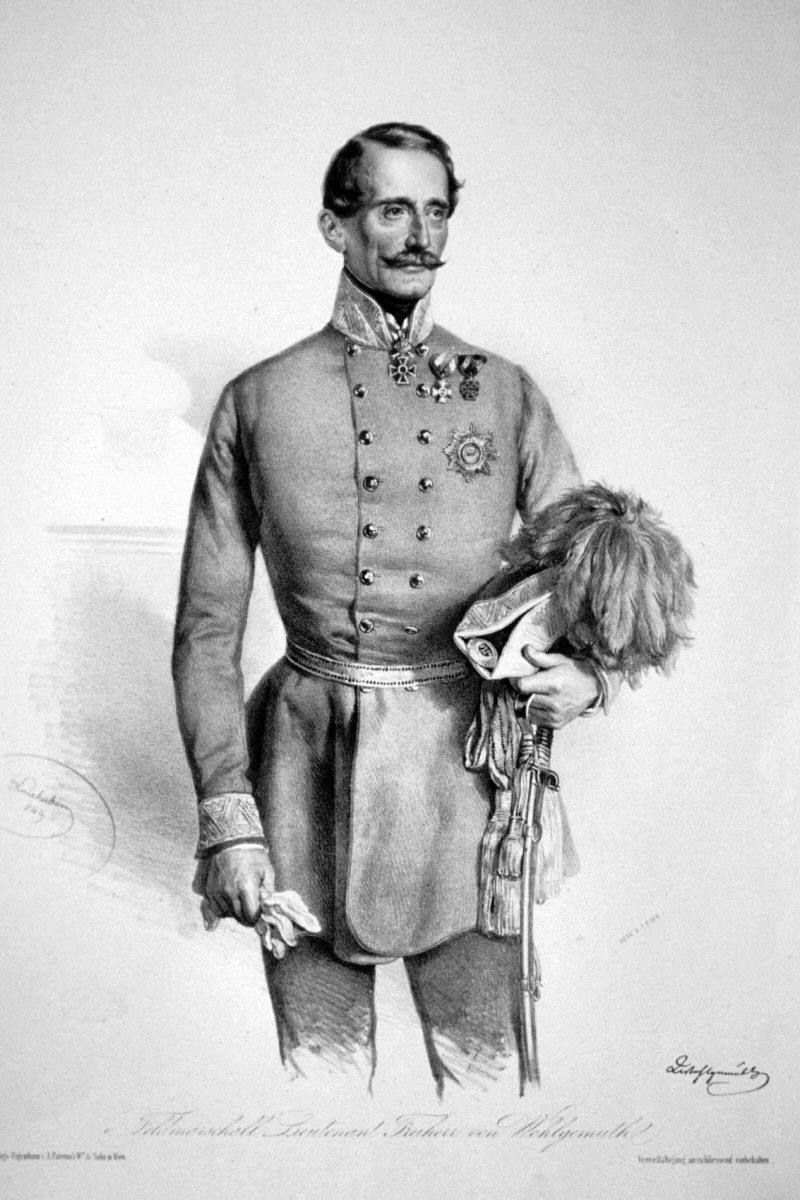
Ludwig von Wohlgemuth

Görgei planned to attack as quickly as possible the Austrian troops on the Western Border of Hungary with the I., II., III., and parts of the VIII. corps, which were under the Central Operational Bureau's command, on the left Bank of the Danube, while the remainder of his troops had to protect the defensive line based on the Rába and Marcal rivers. Before the attack, he hoped that the 12,000 soldiers led by Józef Bem, coming from the southern front and Transylvania, promised by Kossuth to arrive to join his forces (unfortunately, Bem refused to come, saying that this will leave Transylvania defenseless against the imminent Russian invasion). The Hungarian armies at the beginning of the Summer Campaign consisted of 150,000 soldiers, 464 field, and 393 defensive (castle) cannons.

Another problem of the Hungarian army was that many of the talented, experienced Hungarian generals, who helped decisively the success of the Spring Campaign, were no more available (János Damjanich, who broke his leg; Lajos Aulich who became ill; András Gáspár) who resigned from the Hungarian army because of political reasons) and General Görgei was forced to put in their place other officers who were talented soldiers, but were not experienced as army corps leaders, many of them lacking capacity of acting independently when it needed and they had no order to do so, but the military situation required this. So, Görgei put General Károly Knezić in Damjanich's place to lead III. corps, Colonel Lajos Asbóth in Aulich's place to lead II. corps, General Ernő Poeltenberg in Gáspár's place. General György Klapka who formerly was the commander of the I. corps, but who became temporary main commander of the main Hungarian army, called Hungarian Army of the Upper Danube (Feldunai Hadsereg), taking the place of Görgei, who became War Minister, had to give his position at the head of his corps to General József Nagysándor. These new corps commanders lacked the former generals' talent, intuition and experience. Görgei himself, because of now being War Minister, had to fulfill these two heavy tasks (ministry and high commandment of the army), could not focus in the same way on the military actions as he did in the Spring Campaign.

At the start of the Summer Campaign, the Hungarian army had the same problem as the imperial main armies had at the beginning of the Spring Campaign: its commanders did not have much knowledge about the enemy's distribution and where their main forces were stationed. The Hungarian intelligence failed to accomplish this important task. The support from the southern front (around 12 000 men) did not arrive, despite Görgei's hopes, because with the arrival there of Feldzeugmeister Josip Jelačić's troops, in support to the Serbian rebels and Austrian troops stationed there, the military situation changed there in the favor of the imperials, so all the Hungarian troops were needed there.

On the other hand, the Austro-Russian coalition prepared to attack Hungary with 358,000 soldiers and 1354 cannons (165,000 Austrians with 770 cannons and 193,000 Russians with 584 cannons). While Russian and Austrian army groups, led by General Alexander von Lüders and General Eduard Clam-Gallas, prepared their attacks Transylvania from Bucovina, Wallachia and Moldavia, (53,000 soldiers and 133 cannons against 39,000 Hungarians, who were mainly fresh recruits without any war experience, and 107 cannons), the main Russian army under the leadership of Field Marshal Ivan Paskevich had to advance from the North (135,000 Russian soldiers and 448 cannons against 16,500 Hungarians with 49 cannons), the Austro-Croatian-Serbian troops led by Feldzeugmeister Josip Jelačić operated in Southern Hungary (53,000 soldiers with 401 cannons against 34,000 Hungarians and 249 cannons). The numerical disadvantage of the Hungarian armies was augmented also that 13% of the Hungarian troops in Transylvania and Eastern Hungary were used in the sieges of different fortifications in imperial hands (Arad, Temesvár, Gyulafehérvár, Titel) (around 12,000 men), while others (8000 men) were garrisons in different fortifications, so they could not be used as moving forces against the invading Austro-Russian armies.

From the West, the imperial troops which were preparing to attack Hungary were led by Lieutenant Field Marshal Haynau, the commander-in-chief of all the Habsburg forces outside Italy, were about 83,000 soldiers (71,000 Austrians and a 12,000-strong Russian army corps led by Lieutenant General Feodor Sergeyevich Panyutyin) and 336 cannons, against nearly 51,000 Hungarian soldiers (except a part of the garrison of the fortress of Komárom, the VIII. corps, which could not be moved out from the fortress to fight in open field) with 196 field and 244 defensive cannons used only in the fortifications, led by General Görgei. This assured Haynau a huge superiority.

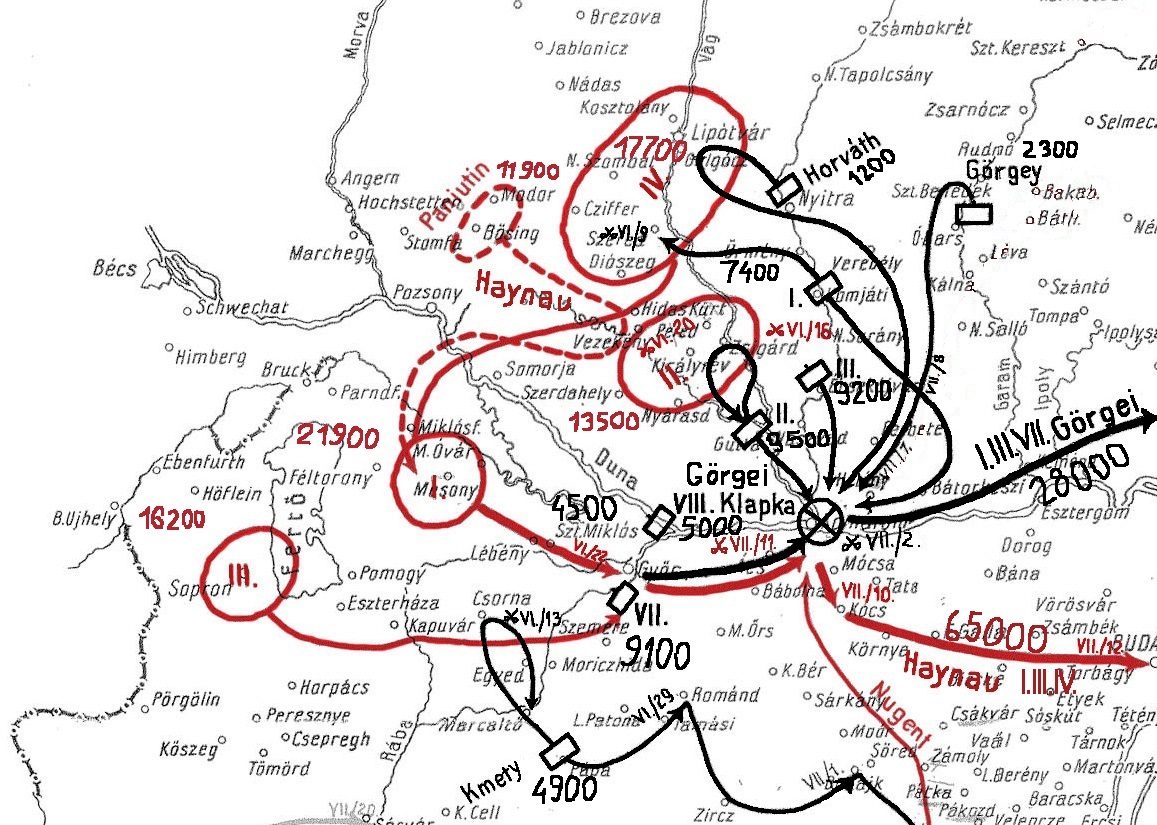
The military situation on the Western Front before and after the Battle of Pered. Red: Austrians. Broken red line: Russians. Black: Hungarians

Görgei's troops were positioned along the river Vág downwards to Komárom, and south of the Danube along the Rába's Eastern bank until Marcaltő. The mining towns (Bakabánya, Besztercebánya, Bélabánya, Körmöcbánya, Libetbánya, Selmecbánya, Újbánya) were protected by a detachment of 2700 soldiers led by Ármin Görgei, to South to this, around Mocsonok, Ürmény and Komjáti were 1300 soldiers at Nyitra, to south the I. corps led by General József Nagysándor consisting of 7400 men, from here until Érsekújvár on the course of the Vág the 9200 soldiers of the III. Corps led by General Károly Knezić were positioned, south of this until Komárom stationed the 8600 men of the II. corps led by Colonel Lajos Asbóth, in Csallóköz stood the 4000 men strong division of the VIII. corps which were defending Komárom under General György Klapka (later another 3400 soldiers left the fortress to support the field army's operations). These 4000 soldiers from Csallóköz assured contact between the troops to North and South from the Danube. South to the Danube, around Győr was the 9000 soldiers of the VII. corps under General Ernő Poeltenberg, and finally the Hungarian line's southernmost unit was the Kmety division consisting of 5100 men. The concentration, in the opportunity of a battle of these troops was impossible, because of the great length of the front, consisting in total 250 kilometers.

The Austrian troops which faced the Hungarians in the Western, under the high command of Lieutenant Field Marshal Julius Jacob von Haynau were positioned as follows. On the right (Southern) bank of the Danube: the III. corps under the lead of Lieutenant General von Moltke was stationed around Sopron having 16,200 men, the I. corps, under the command of General Franz Schlik, consisting of 21,900 soldiers were around Moson, Magyaróvár, Öttevény, Kimle and Hédervár; on the left bank: the bulk of the 13,500 men big II. corps under Lieutenant General Anton Csorich was in Csallóköz, and its Pott-brigade stationed along the Vág river at Farkasd and Vágsellye, the reserve (IV.) corps under the lead of Lieutenant General Ludwig von Wohlgemuth consisted of 17,700 soldiers, and had its headquarters at Nagyszombat, while its brigades were stationed at Szered, Vága and Galgóc. To these troops was sent in support by the high commander of the Russian forces, Marshall Ivan Paskevich the Russian division, consisting of 11,900 soldiers under the lead of Lieutenant General Feodor Sergeyevich Panyutyin, which was stationed first around Pozsony, then, because the Cholera epidemic, which broke out in that region, it was moved to Modor and Bazin.

Görgei planned to start a Hungarian attack on the northern banks of the Danube against the troops of Haynau. But on 13 June, the 15th Hungarian division commanded by Colonel György Kmety attacked on the southern Bank of the Danube, and defeated an Austrian half brigade led by Major General Franz Wyss in the Battle of Csorna. This attack had to attract some of the imperial troops towards the south, to make the task of the main Hungarian attack along the Vág river easier. Haynau indeed sent the order to his troops to move southwards and cross the Danube, but this was not given because Kmety's victory impressed him, but because the imperial commander wanted to start the general offensive there towards Komárom.

== Prelude ==
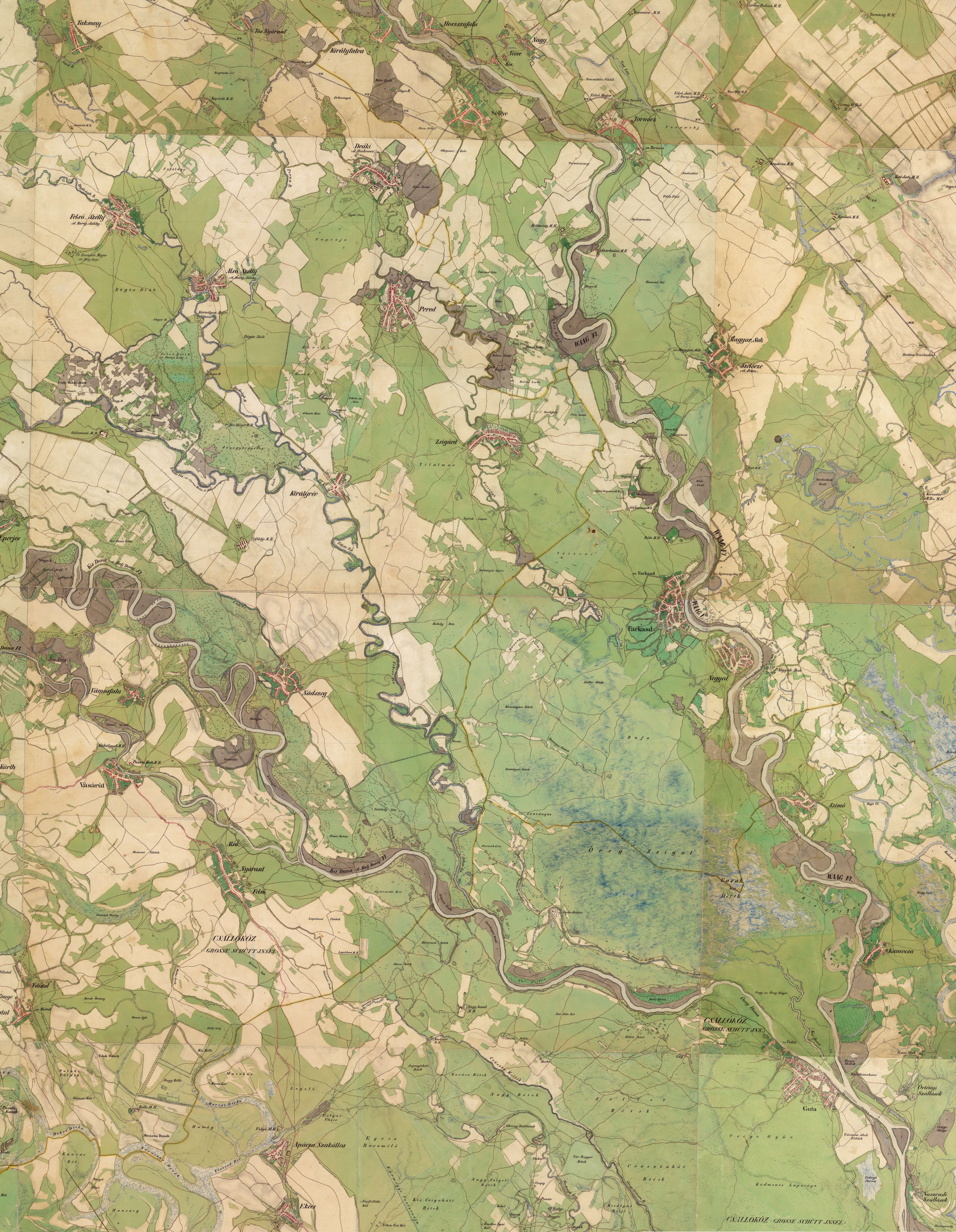
Map of the region in which the Battles of Zsigárd and Pered took place

On 16 June, Colonel Lajos Asbóth, the commander of the II. corps, with around 8000 soldiers, started an attack towards Pered, but, despite initial successes, in the Battle of Zsigárd suffered a defeat, mainly because of the III. corps led by Major General Károly Knezić, which did not come to his rescue. The attack of the I. corps led by Major General József Nagysándor against the Austrian entrenched encampment from Sempte, but he too suffered a defeat. At the same time a Hungarian division advanced to Csilizpatas, but they stopped there. The only success of those actions was the building, by one of the II. corps detachments, of a bridge across the Vág river. This bridge served in the ensuing battle of Pered, an important role for the movement of their troops. Hearing about these defeats, Görgei decided to repeat the attack on Pered, but with more troops. Görgei had the following troops to attack the imperial army at his disposition: the I., II., III. corps and a part of the VIII. corps, which were a totally of 32,907, or according to other sources 31,348 soldiers, with 143 batteries. In the meanwhile on 19 June, Haynau ordered his troops to cross the Danube for the general attack on the southern bank of the Danube against Győr, but to hide his plans, ordered his troops which were still on the northern banks, to repulse the Hungarian attack on the Vág's valley. So he ordered the II. corps together with the reserve (IV.) corps to occupy the banks of Vág, making a bridgehead at Sempte. On 18 June Wohlgemuth installed his headquarters at Galánta. At the same time, he sent the Panyutyin division, from Szenc to Diószeg to support the reserve corps. Wohlgemuth planned an attack with the Pott and Theissing brigades against the Hungarian forces from the region of the lower Vág, but first, he wanted to know the strength of the Hungarians in that region. So, on 18 June the Pott and the Theissing brigades of the II. corps received the order to do a reconnaissance-in-force towards Alsószeli, and after carrying out this, they reported 18,000-20,000 Hungarian soldiers in the region, which made Wohlgemuth postpone the planned attack until more Austrian troops arrive. On 20 Wohlgemuth planned with these two brigades to advance towards Negyed and Királyrév, to learn more precise pieces of information about the enemy when the Hungarian attack started. At the military council held on 19 June in Zsigárd with Herzinger and Pott, Lieutenant General Wohlgemuth decided that in the case of a Hungarian attack from the south, Pott would not defend the village for long, but would retreat to Pered, where he would join forces with Herzinger to stop the Hungarian Hungarian troops. To this end, Pott's brigade was temporarily reinforced with the 5th cuirassier regiment and with the 2nd cavalry artillery battery.

Although Haynau started the transfer of his troops on the right bank of the Danube, on 20–21 June, he still had superior forces against the attacking Hungarians. Lieutenant General Ludwig von Wohlgemuth was named the commandment of the Austro-Russian forces which faced Görgei's troops. On 19 April that year Wohlgemuth suffered a severe defeat from the Hungarians in the Battle of Nagysalló, so on 21 June, he could repair his former mistake.

In the days before the battle, the II. corps stationed at Aszód, the III. corps at Tardoskedd and Mocsonok, while the Rakovszky detachment was at Farkasd. Görgei entrusted the leader of the II. corps Colonel Lajos Asbóth, to be the spearhead of the attack, giving him a chance to repair his mistakes made in the battle of Zsigárd. Asbóth discussed the time when he planned the attack with Lieutenant Colonel Samu Rakovszky, and concentrated his troops on 19 June evening at Aszódpuszta, and at 11 o'clock, they started the crossing of Danube's Érsekújvár branch. Around 2:00 a.m., when the II. corps was still crossing, Görgei arrived at Aszódpuszta. His initial intention was to participate in the upcoming battle, but György Klapka, who was against the Hungarian attack from the next day, asked him to go to the bridge Aszódpuszta, to discuss if the VIII. has to start an attack in Csallóköz at the same time as the attack of the II. and III. corps in the Vág valley, so Görgei left, promising to return to the battlefield as soon as he finished the discussions. Because of this Colonel Asbóth had to start this battle alone, as he did in the battle of Zsigárd.

=== Opposing forces ===
20 June

The Hungarian army

Commander in chief: General Artúr Görgei;
Chief of staff: Colonel József Bayer;

- II. corps:
Commander: Colonel Lajos Asbóth, from 21 June Colonel József Kászonyi;

- Mándy division: 3 1/2 Honvéd battalions, 1 line infantry battalion, 1 jäger company, 1 volunteer company, 2 sapper companies, 6 companies of the 6. (Württemberg) Hussar regiment, 7 three-pounder infantry cannons, 8 six-pounder infantry cannons, 8 twelve-pounder infantry cannons;
- Szekulits division: 5 Honvéd battalions, 2 companies of the 17. (Bocskai) Hussar regiment, 1 company of the Cuman volunteer cavalry, 7 three-pounder infantry cannons, 16 six-pounder infantry cannons;

Total: 10 infantry battalions, 9 cavalry companies, 51 cannons, 8,547 soldiers.

- III. corps:
Commander: General Károly Knezić, from 21 June Colonel Károly Leiningen-Westerburg;

- Czillich division: 3 line infantry battalions, 2 Honvéd battalions, 2 sapper companies, 16 six-pounder cannons;
- Podoski division: 2 line infantry battalions, 2 Honvéd battalions, 6 six-pounder cannons, 4 Congreve rocket launching racks;
- Pikéty division: 2. hussar regiment, 4 companies of the 3. hussar regiment, 14 cannons;

Total: 9 1/3 infantry battalions, 12 cavalry companies, 40 cannons, 9,395 soldiers.

- VIII. corps:
Commander: General György Klapka;

- Kosztolányi division: 1 line infantry battalion, 3 Honvéd battalions, 1/2 sapper company, 12 hussar companies, 9 three-pounder, 8 six-pounder and 8 cavalry cannons;

Total: 4 1/2 infantry battalions, 12 cavalry companies, 25 cannons, 7,832 soldiers.

Army total: 152 1/2 infantry companies, 32 cavalry companies, 4118 horses for riding, 1763 horses for traction, 113 cannons, 25,774 soldiers

Did not participate: I. corps, 56 infantry companies, 12 cavalry companies, 1400 horses for riding, 670 horses for traction, 30 cannons, 7,261 soldiers

Detailed order of battle of the II. Hungarian corps

Commander: Colonel Lajos Asbóth
Chief of staff: Lieutenant Colonel Ferenc Messzéna
Corps adjutant: Major Sándor Mednyánszky
Commander of the artillery: Major Tomas Phillipowszky
Commander of the sappers: Captain Balázs Dullesko
Chief of the medical staff: Dr. Károly Inándy

Corps	Division	Brigade	Unit	Infantry company	Cavalry company	Horse	Cannon	Number
II. Corps; Colonel Lajos Asbóth	4. (Mándy) division	1. (Szabó) brigade	48. Honvéd battalion	6	-	6	-	645
II. Corps; Colonel Lajos Asbóth	4. (Mándy) division	1. (Szabó) brigade	Bocskai (2.52) Honvéd battalion	3	-	6	-	461
II. Corps; Colonel Lajos Asbóth	4. (Mándy) division	1. (Szabó) brigade	Bereg volunteer company	1	-	1	-	136
II. Corps; Colonel Lajos Asbóth	4. (Mándy) division	1. (Szabó) brigade	Pozsony jäger company	1	-	-	-	108
II. Corps; Colonel Lajos Asbóth	4. (Mándy) division	1. (Szabó) brigade	3. sapper battalion	2	-	1	-	229
II. Corps; Colonel Lajos Asbóth	4. (Mándy) division	1. (Szabó) brigade	Colonel division (?) of the 6. (Württemberg) Hussar regiment	-	2	243	-	226
II. Corps; Colonel Lajos Asbóth	4. (Mándy) division	1. (Szabó) brigade	1. three-pounder infantry battery	-	-	95	7	142
II. Corps; Colonel Lajos Asbóth	4. (Mándy) division	1. (Szabó) brigade	2. cavalry battery	-	-	93	5	108
II. Corps; Colonel Lajos Asbóth	4. (Mándy) division	1. (Szabó) brigade	Total	13	2	443	12	2055
II. Corps; Colonel Lajos Asbóth	4. (Mándy) division	2. (Collig) brigade	25. Honvéd battalion	6	-	5	-	595
II. Corps; Colonel Lajos Asbóth	4. (Mándy) division	2. (Collig) brigade	1. battalion of the 39. (Dom Miguel) infantry regiment	6	-	3	-	404
II. Corps; Colonel Lajos Asbóth	4. (Mándy) division	2. (Collig) brigade	54. Honvéd battalion	6	-	2	-	683
II. Corps; Colonel Lajos Asbóth	4. (Mándy) division	2. (Collig) brigade	Lieutenant colonel and 2. Major division (?) of the 6. (Württemberg) Hussar regiment	-	4	487	-	454
II. Corps; Colonel Lajos Asbóth	4. (Mándy) division	2. (Collig) brigade	1. six-pounder infantry battery	-	-	118	8	164
II. Corps; Colonel Lajos Asbóth	4. (Mándy) division	2. (Collig) brigade	2. twelve-pounder battery	-	-	72	8	92
II. Corps; Colonel Lajos Asbóth	4. (Mándy) division	2. (Collig) brigade	Total	18	4	689	16	2392
II. Corps; Colonel Lajos Asbóth	5. (Szekulits) division	1. (Csúzy) brigade	61. Honvéd battalion	6	-	24	-	722
II. Corps; Colonel Lajos Asbóth	5. (Szekulits) division	1. (Csúzy) brigade	63. Honvéd battalion	6	-	17	-	536
II. Corps; Colonel Lajos Asbóth	5. (Szekulits) division	1. (Csúzy) brigade	49. Honvéd battalion	4	-	19	-	526
II. Corps; Colonel Lajos Asbóth	5. (Szekulits) division	1. (Csúzy) brigade	2. three-pounder infantry battery	-	-	94	7	139
II. Corps; Colonel Lajos Asbóth	5. (Szekulits) division	1. (Csúzy) brigade	6. six-pounder infantry battery	-	-	116	8	144
II. Corps; Colonel Lajos Asbóth	5. (Szekulits) division	1. (Csúzy) brigade	Total	10	-	270	15	2067
II. Corps; Colonel Lajos Asbóth	5. (Szekulits) division	2. (Kisfaludy) brigade	56. Honvéd battalion	6	-	31	-	793
II. Corps; Colonel Lajos Asbóth	5. (Szekulits) division	2. (Kisfaludy) brigade	60. Honvéd battalion	6	-	13	-	761
II. Corps; Colonel Lajos Asbóth	5. (Szekulits) division	2. (Kisfaludy) brigade	1. Major division of the 17. (Bocskai) Hussar regiment	-	2	245	-	240
II. Corps; Colonel Lajos Asbóth	5. (Szekulits) division	2. (Kisfaludy) brigade	Cuman volunteer cavalry company	-	1	80	-	80
II. Corps; Colonel Lajos Asbóth	5. (Szekulits) division	2. (Kisfaludy) brigade	5. six-pounder infantry battery	-	-	114	8	159
II. Corps; Colonel Lajos Asbóth	5. (Szekulits) division	2. (Kisfaludy) brigade	Total	12	3	483	8	2033
Corps total				53	9	1855	51	8547

The Austrian army

Commander in chief: Field Marshal Julius Jacob von Haynau;
Chief of staff: Lieutenant Colonel Wilhelm von Ramming;

- II. corps:
Commander: Lieutenant General Anton Csorich;
Chief of staff: Lieutenant Colonel Franz Jungbauer;
Colloredo division;

- Pott brigade: 3. & 4. battalions of the Haynau infantry regiment, 3. battalion of the Koudelka infantry regiment, 3. battalion of the Fürstenwärther infantry regiment, 11. six-pounder infantry battery (4 infantry battalions, 6 cannons);
- Liebler brigade: 1., 2., 3. & 1. Landwehr battalions of the Archduke Stephen infantry regiment, 1. battalion of the Wimpfen infantry regiment, 4 companies of the Civalart uhlan cavalry regiment, 8. six-pounder infantry battery (5 infantry battalions, 4 cavalry companies, 6 cannons);
- Barco brigade: 1., 2., & 3. battalions of the Mazzuchelli infantry regiment, 3. battalion of the Baumgarten infantry regiment, 1. Landwehr battalion of the Baumgarten infantry regiment, 4. border guard regiment of Otočac, 2 companies of the Civalart uhlan cavalry regiment, 13. six-pounder infantry battery (6 infantry battalions, 2 cavalry companies, 6 cannons);
- Artillery reserve: 2 twelve-pounder batteries, 1 six-pounder battery, 1 cavalry battery (24 cannons);

Total: 15 infantry battalions, 6 cavalry companies, 42 cannons, 2 military bridge equipment, 13,505 soldiers.

- IV. (reserve) corps:
Commander: Lieutenant General Ludwig von Wohlgemuth;
Chief of staff: Major Joseph Freiherr von Weber;
1. (Herzinger) division;

- Theissing brigade: Schneider, Fischer, Richter & Bittermann grenadier battalions, 18. six-pounder infantry battery (4 infantry battalions, 6 cannons);
- Perin brigade: Rattay, Koudelka, Pásztory & Trenk grenadier battalions, 16. six-pounder infantry battery (4 infantry battalions, 6 cannons);

2. (Burits) division;

- Jablonowski brigade: 1., 2., 3. & Landwehr battalions of the Nassau infantry regiment, 7. six-pounder infantry battery (5 infantry battalions, 4 cavalry companies, 6 cannons);
- Lederer brigade: 2 companies of the Emperor Franz Joseph cuirassier regiment, 2 companies of the Sunstenau cuirassier regiment, 6 companies of the Emperor Ferdinand cuirassier regiment, 6 companies of the Auersperg cuirassier regiment, 2. cavalry battery (16 cavalry companies, 6 cannons);
- Artillery reserve: 2 twelve-pounder batteries, 1 six-pounder battery, 1 Congreve rocket battery (24 cannons);

Total: 17 infantry battalions, 24 cavalry companies, 60 cannons, 2 military equipment, 14,000 soldiers.

- 9. combined Russian infantry division:
Commander: Lieutenant General Fedor Sergeyevich Panyutin;
Chief of staff: Major Kabiuv;

- Kobyakov infantry brigade: 15. jäger regiment of count Dibitch Zabalkanski, 18. jäger regiment of count Paskevich Erivanski (8 infantry battalions);
- 9. Semyakin artillery brigade: 2 companies of Civalart uhlans, 1 heavy artillery, 1 light artillery (2 cavalry companies, 48 cannons);

Total: 16 infantry battalions, 2 cavalry companies, 48 cannons. 12,799 soldiers.

Army total: 219 infantry companies, 32 cavalry companies, 172 cannons, 40,304 soldiers

Detailed order of battle of the Pott and Theissing brigades

Commander Major General Anton Freiherr von Herzinger

Brigade	Unit	Infantry company	Cavalry company	Horse	Cannon	Congreve rocket	Number
Pott brigade	2. kaiserjäger battalion	6	-	-	-	-	c.586
Pott brigade	1. battalion of the 10. (Mazzuchelli) line infantry regiment	5	-	-	-	-	c.692
Pott brigade	3. battalion of the 40. (Koudelka) line infantry regiment	5	-	-	-	-	c.681
Pott brigade	3. battalion of the 56. (Fürstenwärther) line infantry regiment	6	-	-	-	-	c.717
Pott brigade	3. battalion of the 57. (Haynau) line infantry regiment	3	-	-	-	-	c.506
Pott brigade	1. Landwehr battalion of the 58. (Archduke Stephen) line infantry regiment	6	-	-	-	-	c.743
Pott brigade	3. sapper battalion	1/4	-	-	-	-	c.31
Pott brigade	1. colonel company of the 5. (Liechtenstein) Chevau-léger regiment	-	1	117	-	-	c.132
Pott brigade	11. six-pounder infantry battery	-	-	94	6	-	c.91
Pott brigade	3. six-pounder infantry 1/2 battery	-	-	36	3	-	c.47
Pott brigade	15. Congreve rocket battery	-	-	83	-	6	c.90
Pott brigade	Total	30 1/4	1	c.314	9	6	c.4316
Theissing brigade	Schneider grenadier battalion	6	-	-	-	-	c.784
Theissing brigade	Richter grenadier battalion	6	-	-	-	-	c.733
Theissing brigade	Fischer grenadier battalion	4	-	-	-	-	c.584
Theissing brigade	Bittermann grenadier battalion	4	-	-	-	-	c.362
Theissing brigade	5. (Auersperg) cuirassier regiment	-	6	736	-	-	c.710
Theissing brigade	19. six-pounder infantry battery	-	-	76	6	-	c.110
Theissing brigade	2. cavalry battery	-	-	118	6	-	c.120
Theissing brigade	Total	20	6	c.930	12	-	c.3403 (Note: The number of the Austrian units are shown with the circa sign because the account about their number was made on 19 June.)

== Battle ==
=== 20 June ===
On 20 June Görgei, seeing the lack of success of his troops on 16 June, personally took command of his troops, mostly following the same plans of war elaborated for the 16 June attack. Also a part of the VIII. corps (the garrison of Komárom) arrived in Csallóköz to support the attack. The II. corps had to attack again Királyrév and Zsigárd, as they did in the Battle of Zsigárd four days earlier, the III. corps had to support them after crossing the Vág at Negyed, following the II. corps towards Zsigárd. The I. corps under the lead of General József Nagysándor had to make demonstration movements before Sempte, and if the conditions allowed it, had to start a real attack. The detachment of Colonel Horváth had to watch the road towards Nyitra, to advance, and demonstrate towards Galgóc. Klapka with the detached units of the VIII. corps had to protect the bridge from Aszódpuszta and to assure the retreat way of the II. corps.

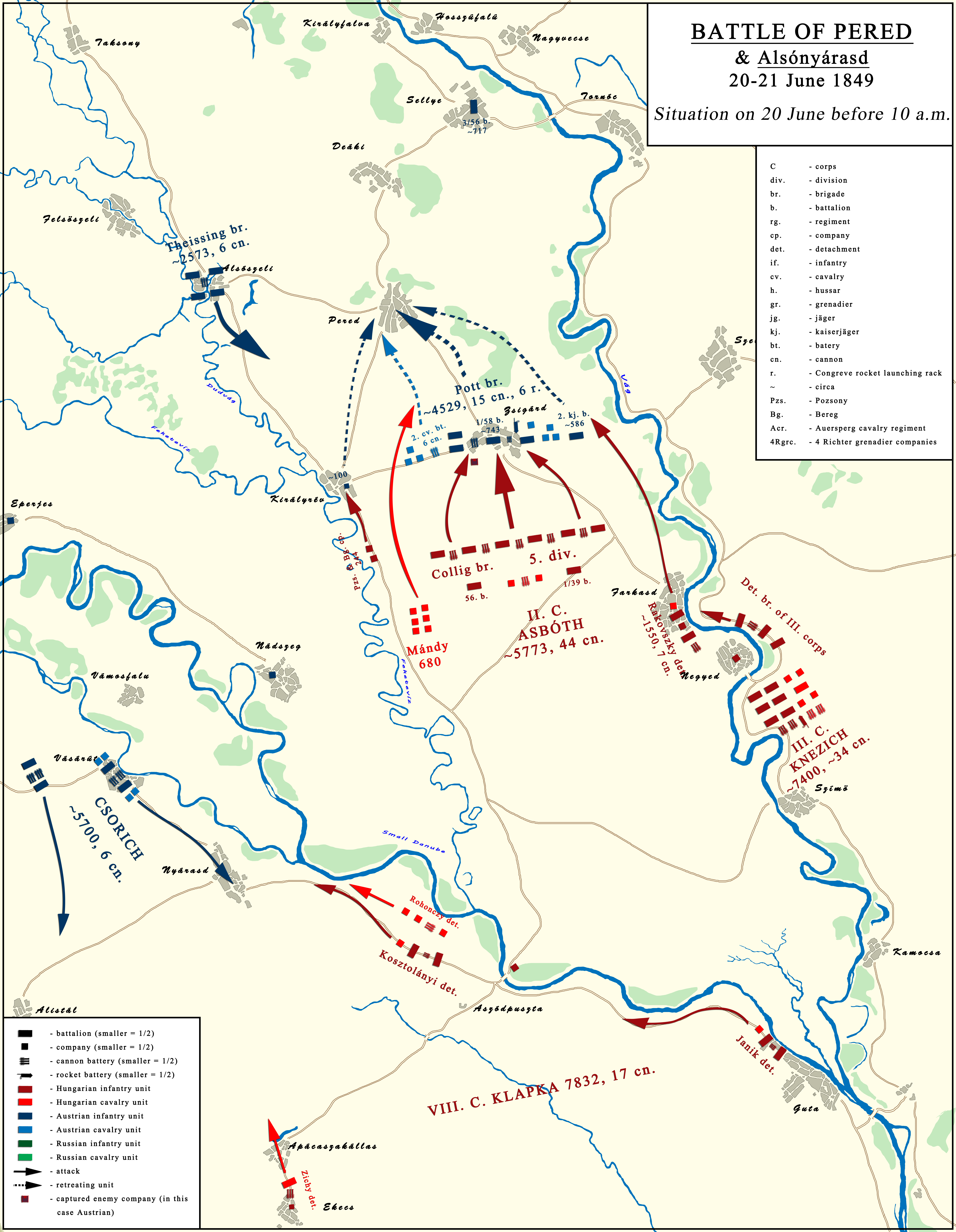
Battle of Pered, 20 June 1849, before 10 a.m

The II. corps led by Asbóth, after crossing, at the dawn of 20 June, the Érsekújvár Danube branch at 5 a.m., arrived undetected in the vicinity of Zsigárd with around 8000 soldiers and 48 cannons (he left his sappers and some units at the bridges over the nearby rivers). The Austrian intelligence took notice of the apparition of the II. corps around 4:30 a.m. in the vicinity of Zsigárd, so the Pott brigade drew up in battle formation. The Pott and Theissing brigades had around 7000 soldiers and 24 cannons (its 56/3 battalion was guarding Vágsellye), but only the Pott brigade was in Zsigárd. The Theissing brigade, which was stationed at Alsószeli, was also informed about the attack against Zsigárd, but they did not move from there yet, because Major General Herzinger feared that the Hungarians will also attack from the south and east. This belief was strengthened in him also by the demonstration of a brigade from the III. corps before Vágsellye, on the Eastern bank of the Vág, and the dense fog of that morning made it hard to judge the situation. Pott organized his brigade in two lines with the 58/1 Landwehr battalion in the center defending Zsigárd, 3 cavalry companies and the cavalry battery covering the right flank, and the 2. kaiserjäger battalion covering the left flank. Around 6 a.m. Asbóth's troops took the battle position in front of Zsigárd, in two lines. In the first line on the right wing and center were 4 battalions of the 5. division with 3 batteries, while the left wing was made by 2 battalions of the Collig brigade with 2 batteries. The second (reserve) line was represented by the 39/1 line battalion, the 56 Honvéd battalion, 2 companies of the 6. Hussar regiment, and the 2. cavalry battery. The left flank of the Hungarian battle order was covered by 6 companies of the cavalry of the II. corps led by Major Ignác Mándy. Colonel Lajos Asbóth wanted to attack immediately, but Colonel István Szekulits, advised him to wait until Görgei arrived, and the morning fog cleared. Asbóth, after waiting until 7:00 a.m. for the arrival of Görgei (who in the meanwhile was discussing with Klapka at Aszódpuszta), and fearing that the Rakovszky detachment (composed of the 48. Honvéd battalion, the Bocskay battalion, a company of the Württemberg hussar regiment, a three-pounder battery, and a sapper company; around 1550 soldiers and 7 cannons), which according to the plan, had to attack Zsigárd from the direction of Negyed, will enter alone in the battle against the superior enemy brigade, ordered his troops to start the attack.

The superior Hungarian artillery won the duel with the Austrian cannons, then covered the infantries and cavalry's attack. The Austrians tried to withstand the attack of the Hungarians, but when the Pozsony jäger company and the Bereg volunteer company occupied without much resistance Királyrév from the Austrian garrison, while the 49. battalion attacked the right edge of Zsigárd, the 63. battalion entered it from the southwest, while the infantry of the Rakovszky detachment from the southeast the 58/1 Landwehr battalion, which was forced to retreat. Noticing that the Hussars try to encircle Zsigárd, Pott gave the order to retreat towards Pered, which task was carried out in order. But the 3. company of the Landwehr battalion which defended the eastern part of the village for too long, was encircled, and nearly all its soldiers fell prisoner.

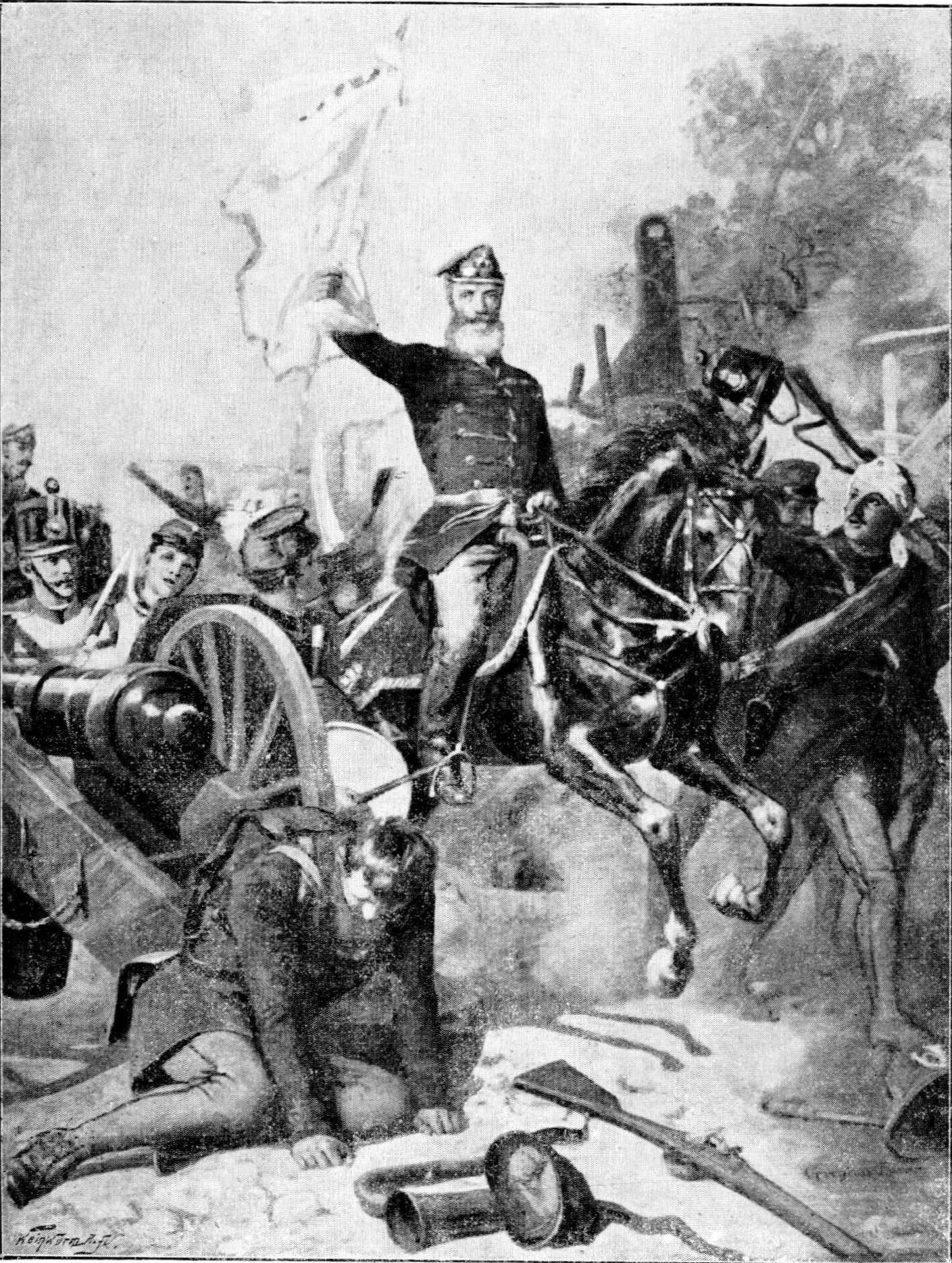
Lajos Asbóth, the commander of the first day of the battle of Pered.

After retreating from Zsigárd, the Pott brigade took a position in front of Pered. Now also the Theissing brigade joined them after Herzinger understood that from the direction of Vágsellye the Hungarians will not attack. Now Herzinger took the overall command over the two brigades, deploying his units on the right side of the Pott brigade, with the infantry next to Pott's cavalry, with the 5. (Auersperg) cuirassier regiment on the right flank. When the fight started again, seeing that the still superior Hungarian artillery caused important losses, especially to the Austrian right flank, Herzinger tried to resolve this by encircling the Hungarians, occupying Királyréve, defended by the Pozsony jägers and the Bereg volunteer company, so he sent 4 companies of the Major and Colonel division of the Auersperg cuirassier regiment from the Austrian right flank to occupy the village, but this attack was repulsed. Their attack crumbled in the crossfire of the Hungarian center and left flank. Noticing the favorable opportunity, Asbóth sent Major Mándy with the 8 Hussar companies and the cavalry artillery to attack the retreating Austrian cavalry, shattering them completely, then encircling the Austrian right flank. Exploiting this success, Asbóth ordered the general attack on the left flank. Feeling that his troops cannot withstand the Hungarian attack, Herzinger gave the order for a general retreat. The Theissing brigade, under the leadership of Herzinger was being pushed back by the Hussars and cavalry artillery of Mándy, supported by the infantry and artillery of the Collig brigade. Being unable to withstand these attacks, the Austrian right wing withdrew from Alsószeli and Felsőszeli, continuing their retreat towards Diószeg. At Asbóth's order, Mándy stopped their pursuit at Alsószeli.

But on the Austrian left flank, in the battle for Pered, the situation was different. Despite receiving Herzinger's order to retreat, Pott refused, and he prepared with his brigade to resist in the village. Although much of his cavalry retreated together with the right wing, he managed to hold back in Pered 4 companies of the Richter grenadier battalion from the Theissing brigade. He deployed his troops as it follows. The southern part of the village was defended by the 40/3 line battalion, its western portion by the Richter grenadiers, and 3 companies of the 57/3 line battalion, while the eastern part by the 2. kaiserjäger battalion, 2 companies of the 10/1 line battalion, and 1 company of the 58/1 Landwehr battalion. Pott reinforced the defense with the 11. infantry battery on the southern, the 2. cavalry battery on the western, and the 3. six-pounder infantry 1/2 battery, together with the 15. Congreve rocket 1/2 battery on the eastern edge of Pered. He kept in reserve behind the village around 50 cuirassiers, 4 companies of the 10/1, and other 4 companies of the 58/1 Landwehr battalions.

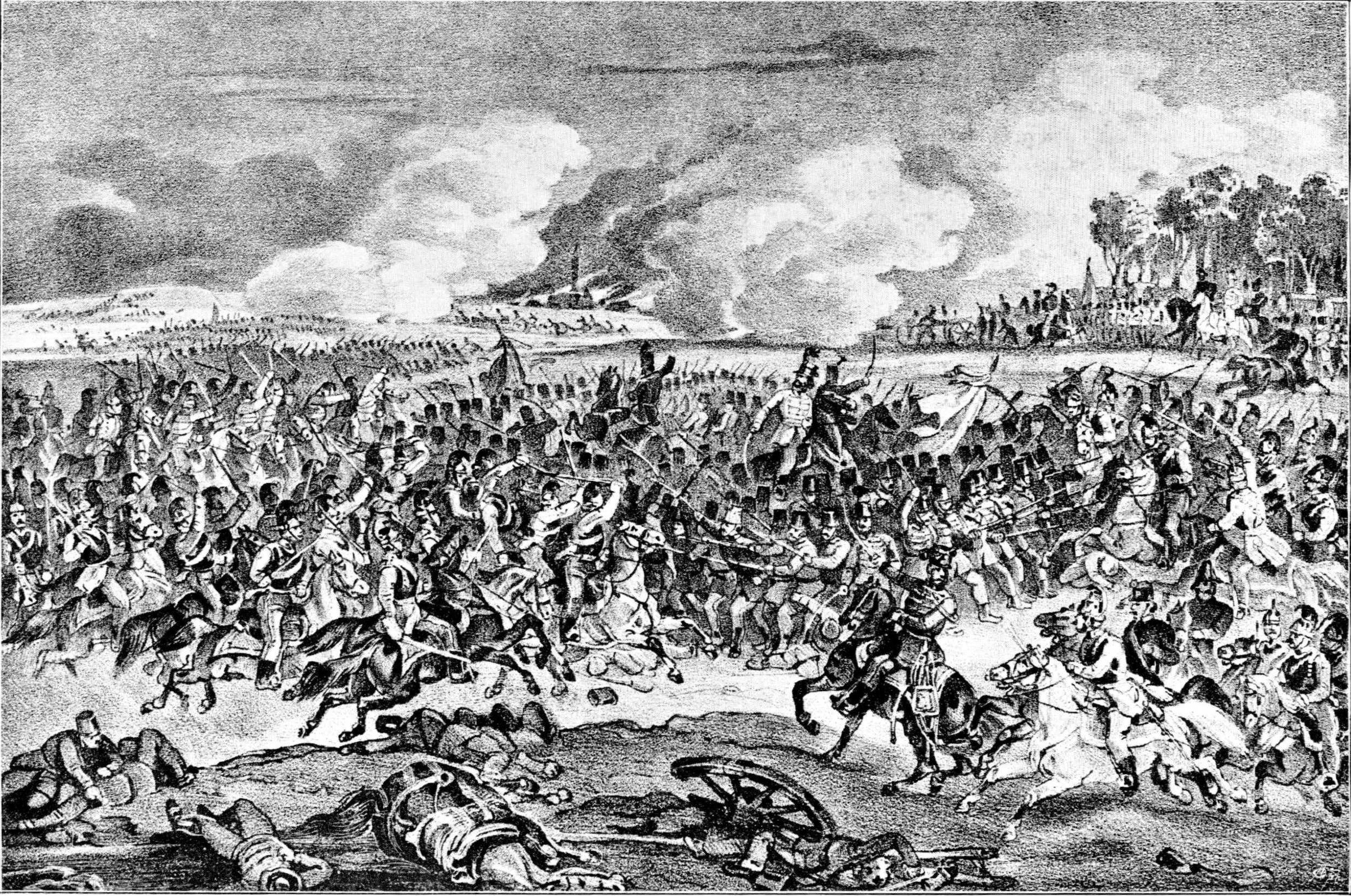
Battle of Pered 20 June 1849

Asbóth understood that the attack against the well-defended village will be risky, but he decided to attack nevertheless, knowing that after the Battle of Zsigárd he was criticized because he did not take control over it. First, after an artillery preparation he sent the 60., 61. and 63. Honvéd battalions to attack Pered frontally, but this attack crumbled in the heavy artillery and infantry fire of the Austrians, the soldiers retreating in disorder. Then, after reorganizing them, he positioned the troops on a small hill, in line with the artillery, Asbóth sent Colonel Szekulits with the 39/1 and the 56. Honvéd battalions against the western, while the Rakovszky detachment against the eastern part of Pered. But the encirclement went much slower than expected, which made Asbóth lose his patience, so he went to the western column, on the lead of which, with the war flag of the 63. battalion in his hand, he managed to break into Pered, but the counter-attack of the Austrians, supported by the 4 companies of 10/1. battalion from the reserve forced them to retreat. Meanwhile, Rakovszky sent the company of the Württemberg hussars of his detachment to capture the combined Austrian battery from the eastern edge of Pered, but the shootings of the Austrian cannons and of the kaiserjägers forced them to withdraw on the Hungarian center. This attracted the cannonade of the Austrian artillery on the 60., 61. and 63. Honvéd battalions, which were stationed on the small hill from the center, causing disarray among them, and forcing them to retreat. The same thing happened with the 49. Honvéd battalion which came to replace them.

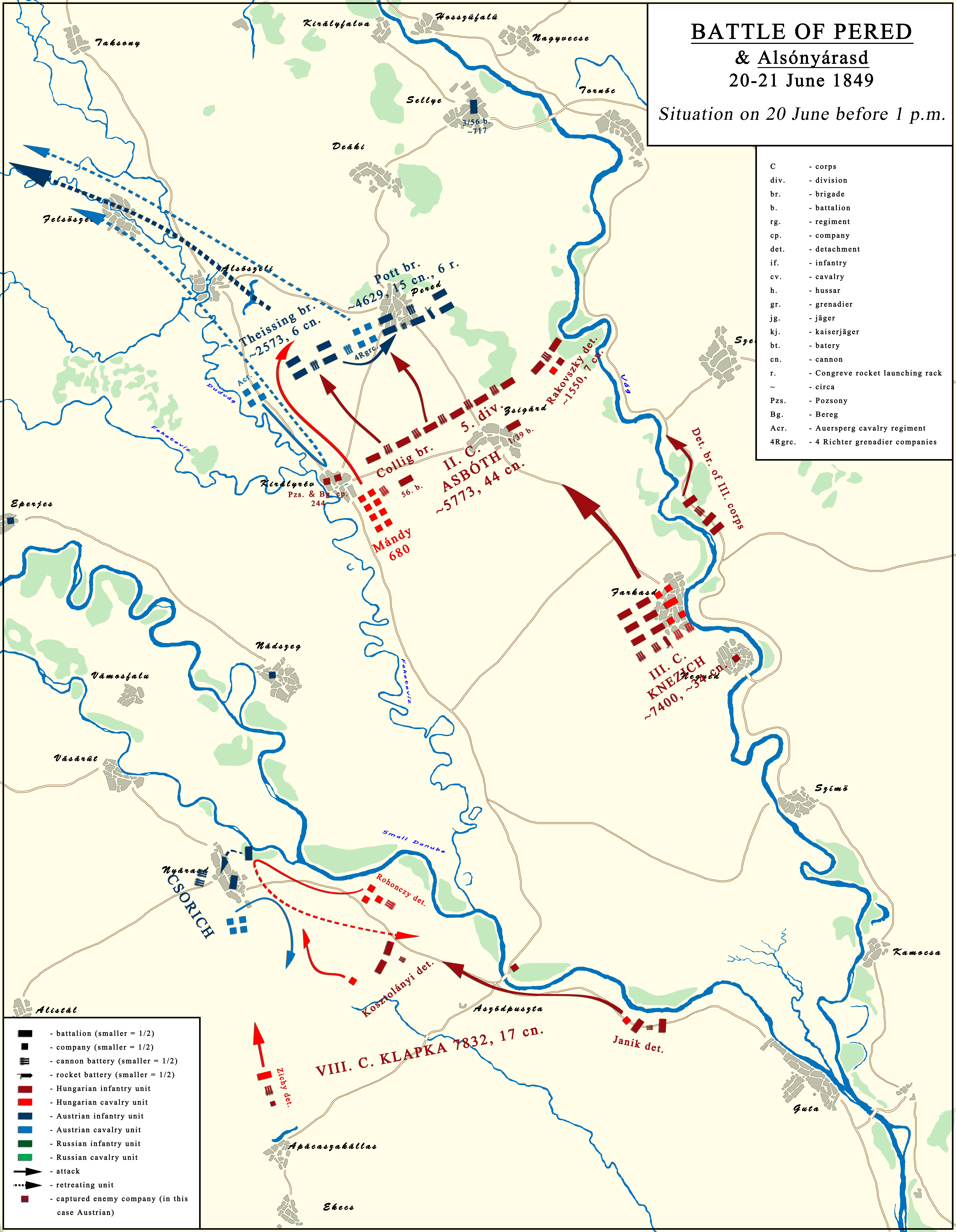
Battle of Pered, 20 June 1849, before 1 p.m

This was the situation at 1:00 (or 2:00) p.m. when Görgei arrived on the battlefield. He waited hours for Klapka to arrive at Aszódpuszta. When the latter finally arrived, they agreed on continuing the attack. Klapka undertook the leading of a distraction attack in Csallóköz, in order to ease the advance of the Hungarian troops attacking at Pered. When they finished the discussion around 10 a.m., Görgei went towards the battlefield, and, as mentioned above, arrived at Pered around 1:00 or 2:00 p.m. Right when he arrived, he saw the retreat of the 60., 61. and 63. Honvéd battalions. He rode to them, and with the help of the hussars from his staff, managed to reestablish the order among the soldiers, and led them back to their original position on the hill. Then came Asbóth, who was riding back from the troops attacking the western part of Pered, after he finally understood that only through a concentrated attack will be able to occupy the village. Hearing that the three battalions suffered heavy losses on the hill, he ordered them to retreat behind it, to be safe from the enemy projectiles. This infuriated Görgei, who could not accept the fact that Asbóth overturned his earlier order of positioning the battalions on the hill, he really tore into his corps commander. After that, because the Rakovszky detachment restarted its attack against the eastern part of the village, giving the opportunity to also start a frontal attack, he sent Asbóth to lead the column attacking the western section, while he took the lead of the battalions attacking the southern section of Pered.

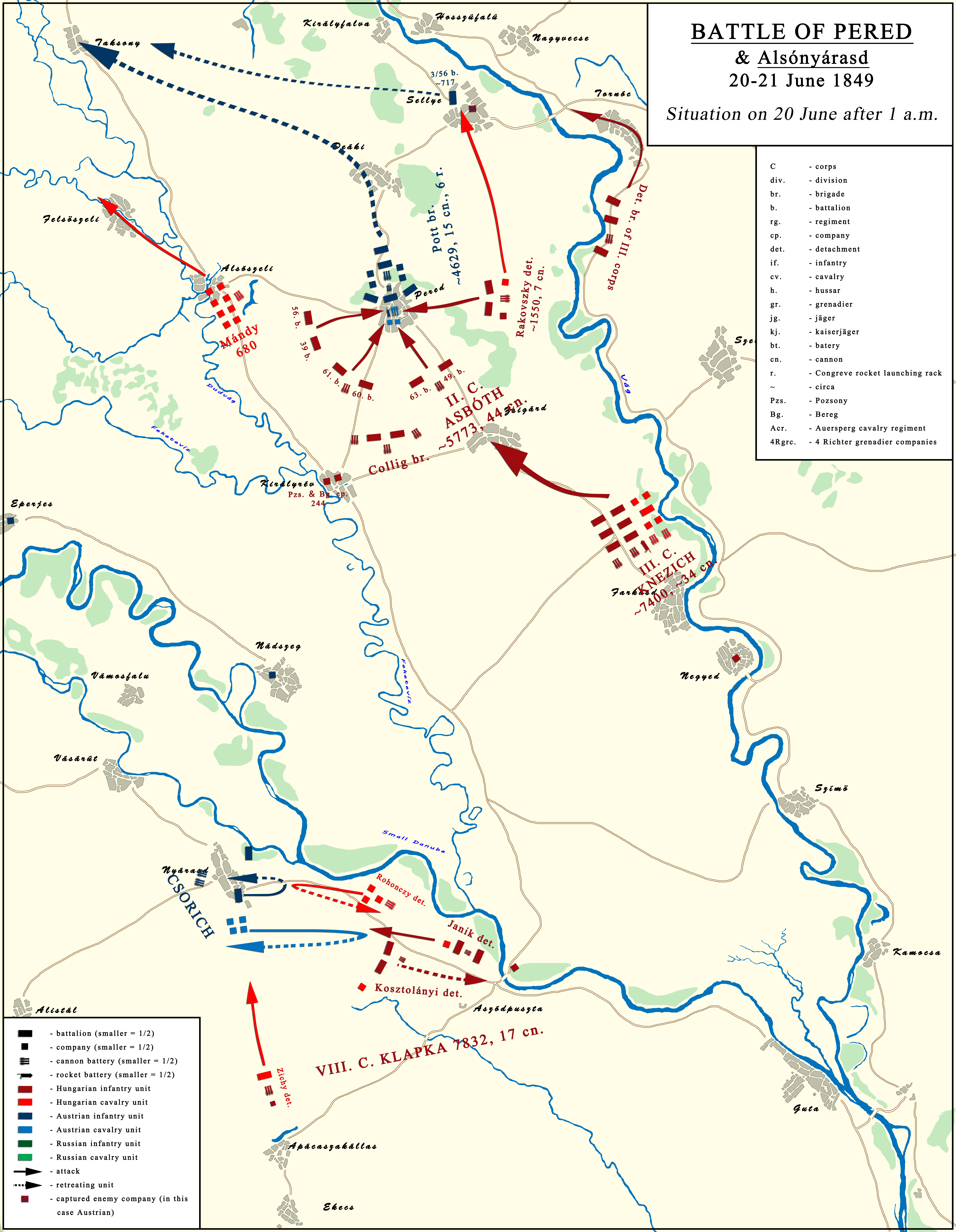
Battle of Pered, 20 June 1849, after 1 p.m

The Rakovszky detachment broke into the eastern part of Pered despite the fierce resistance. In response, Pott sent the 58/1. battalion from the reserve, which managed to stop the Hungarian advance, but because their lines broke, they could not push the Hungarians out of the village. The attacks against the southern and the western sections of Pered were preceded by a fierce artillery duel, during which some of the Austrian batteries run out of their ammunition, then the 49. and 63. battalions attacked the village from the south, while the 60. and 61. battalions from the southwest, while the Szekulits column, under the leadership of Asbóth, renewed their attack from the west. The Austrians did their best, but the 40/3. line battalion could not withstand the attack, and retreated inside Pered, and as a result of this, the western and southwestern Hungarian columns met in the main square of the village. Pott understood that he cannot hold the enemy back for more, so he ordered the retreat through Deáki to Taksony. The retreat was covered by a division of the 2. kaiserjäger battalion, a 1/2 cuirassier company, a 1/2 cavalry battery, and the 15. 1/2 Congreve rocket battery. Initially Görgei wanted to pursue the enemy, but seeing the fatigue of his troops, he understood that this cannot bring any result. The retreating Austrians were not pursued by the hussars from Alsószeli either, only the artillery from there tried to cause them some losses, but without much success. Görgei could not count on the III. corps, and the brigade demonstrating in front of Vágsellye neither, because the first arrived only around 3:00 p.m., while the second round 5:00 p.m. Only the some Hussar recon parties followed the retreating enemy, raiding towards Felsőszeli, Deáki, and Vágsellye, forcing the Austrian detachment from here to retreat, and taking prisoner one of their squads (around 100 soldiers). near the Vág river. By taking Pered, the Hungarian army won the first day of the battle.

On the first day of the battle, the Austrians lost 305 soldiers, 9 officers, and 51 horses. The Hungarian losses are unknown but probably were similarly high as the Austrians.

So ended the first day of the battle.

That evening, analyzing the military events of that day, Görgei felt the need to doing important changes in the leadership of his troops. First, he relieved General Károly Knezić from the leadership of the III. corps because of his incapacity he did not cross the Vág, and came to the battlefield, to support Asbóth's attack. Although a good soldier, Knezić did not possess the qualities needed for a corps commander: situation awareness and adaptability to unexpected situations. Görgei appointed in his place Colonel Károly Leiningen-Westerburg, his vacant division commander position being taken over by Colonel Károly Földváry. The officers present at this council agreed to Görgei's decision.

After this, he decided about Asbóth's fate. Regarding this case, it was much harder to take a decision. Colonel Lajos Asbóth was the only corps commander who participated in the battle, until the assault on Pered, leading his troops to victory on the first day of the battle, distinguishing himself through his personal courage and example. But during the attack against Pered he lost control over the situation. Knowing that after the battle of Zsigárd he was criticized for leaving operational enemy forces near the battlefield, which then, after being reinforced, turned the tide of the battle by counter-attacking, he wanted to conquer Pered at all costs. But he chose a wrong method for this. The village could be encircled from the left, threatening the enemy's retreat route to Deáki, and with this, he could force the enemy to retreat without any fight, furthermore, in a favorable situation, he could even capture a part of the Pott brigade. Instead of this he chose to try to capture the village through a 4 hours, bloody, and very costly fight, in which he failed to coordinate the attacks of his troops. Furthermore, by ordering the units led by Major Mándy to confine themselves to hold Alsószeli, he prevented the latter to send his hussars to pursue the retreating Austrian troops. So Görgei decided to relieve Asbóth from the command of the II. corps because of wasting so many lives during the siege of Pered, exhausting his troops, losing his determination and self-confidence during the battle, and, though unwillingly, overturning his order to leave the battalions on the hill, and appointed Colonel József Kászonyi as the new commander of the II. corps. But he still appreciated Asbóth's courage and heroism during the battle, so he did not want to completely remove him from the army (as he did with Knezić), but he wanted to entrust him with the leadership of a newly formed division.

But Görgei's drastic decision, regarding Asbóth, very soon proved to be a very bad idea. When the officers heard about the replacement of this very esteemed and beloved colonel, many of them chose to express their protest by calling in sick, then leaving the army: Colonel István Szekulits; the Lieutenant Colonels Ferenc Meszéna and István Patay; the Majors Károly Mihály, Gusztáv Szabó-Gyallay, Ferenc Collig, Pál Csúzy and Mór Kisfaludy. Also Asbóth refused to take the command of the division and asked for 6 weeks sick leave, then went to the capital to protest, in front of the govern, against Görgei's decision. Because of these, Görgei was forced replace, hurriedly, the leaving officers with new ones. The leaving chief of staff, Lieutenant Colonel Ferenc Meszéna was replaced with Major Ernst Hügel, while the leadership of the Szekulits division was taken over by Major Pál Horváth, the Mándy division was taken over by Major Alexander Buttler, while Major Ignác Mándy being named commander of the newly formed cavalry division. These resignations and replacements came at a very bad moment for the Hungarian army: right in the middle of the battle, and before the counter-attack of the much superior Austrian army, reinforced with a Russian division, creating uncertainty and confusion among the officers and soldiers. The wave of resignations continued even days after 20 June, and other officers too left the army. Also, a letter of protest started to circulate, which was signed by the majority of the officers (37 people) of the II. corps.

==== Military actions related to the battle on 20 June ====
On the same day, both the Hungarians and the Austrians conducted smaller military actions in other directions, in order to divert the attention of each other's troops positioned south and west from the battlefield, and prevent them to march towards Pered.

The I. corps troops led by General József Nagysándor did not make almost anything except some weak demonstration movements before Sempte, then retreated to his initial positions.

In the same time General Ernő Poeltemberg who was leading the VII. corps from the right bank of the Danube to prevent the imperial troops South of the Danube to send reinforcements to their comrades on the left bank of the Danube to Csallóköz, during the battle. The Hungarian General accomplished his task, conducting a reconnaissance-in-force towards Moson and Hédervár.

The most important military encounter related to the first day of the battle of Pered, was the Battle of Alsónyárasd between the detached units of the VIII. corps led by General György Klapka and the II. Austrian corps led by Lieutenant General Anton Csorich, which ended in stalemate, both troops retreating to their initial position.

=== 21 June ===
Görgei planned to attack the next day to advance with the III. corps towards Galánta via Vágsellye, while the II. corps protects its side by moving towards Alsószeli and Deáki. But already on the night of 20 June, he learned that the enemy troops commanded by Wohlgemuth will attack, and the Panyutyin-division was also sent to help the IV. and the II. corps. So he understood that the relative balance of forces between the two armies (20,000 Hungarians with 80 cannons against 25,000 Austrians with 96 cannons) was about to be upset by the arrival of 12,000 Russians. So Görgei ordered Klapka to hold with any costs the bridge from Aszódpuszta, and József Nagysándor to force the crossing, with his troops, of the Vág river at Szered. The II. and III. corps had to wait for the Austro-Russian attack and to repel it. The key to the Hungarian success was the arrival in time of the I. corps of Nagysándor, after accomplishing his initial tasks, to help the other two corps. Görgei believed that if Nagysándor's I. corps would make a successful attack, pushing the enemy back and crossing the Vág river at Sempte, this would enable the counterattack of the II. and III. Hungarian corps, and the enemy instead of concentrating to capture the bridges from Aszódpuszta and Negyed to cut the retreat root of the Hungarians, will have to fight against the Hungarian attack from the front, which with the help of Nagysándor's arriving troops, can threaten to encircle the main Austro-Russian troops north from Pered. So the only choice of Wohlgemuth would be the retreat, which would lead to the accomplishment of the Hungarian plans and the victory. Görgei found also useful that his troops on the next day had to fight with Russian troops too because they could so measure the tsarist's real battle value.

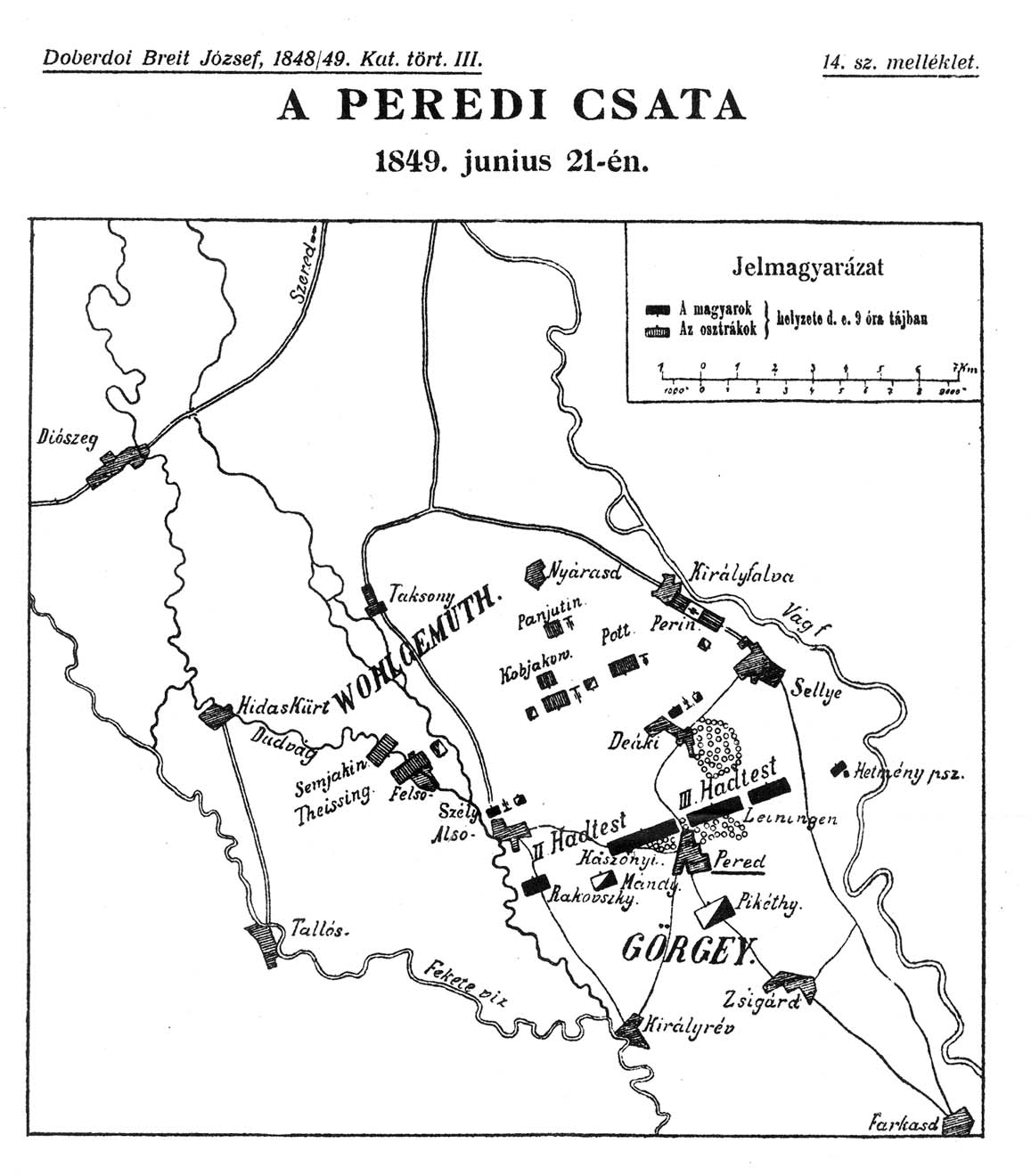
Situation in the battle of Pered on 21 June, before the Austro-Russian attack: black: Hungarians, gray: Austro-Russians

The battle order of the II. and III. Hungarian corps on 21 June at the dawn: the III. corps was deployed on the right wing, right of the main central street of Pered, until the Hetmény farm near the Vág, on the left wing, 2000 paces south from Alsószeli, along the Dudvág stood Colonel Samu Rakovszky, with an infantry brigade of the II. corps, reinforced by important units of cavalry and artillery, from which 2 battalions some cannons and cavalrymen were sent forward to hold Alsószeli, while the bulk of the II. corps occupied the center between Rakovszky's troops and the main street of Pered. The cavalry of the II. corps, under the lead of Colonel Mándy was deployed on the left wing of their corps, while the rest of the cavalry, under Colonel Pikéthy remained behind Pered. The two corps had 19 2/3 infantry battalions, 21 cavalry companies, and 80 cannons, with around 20,000 soldiers.

On the other side Haynau knew that if the next day his troops will achieve a victory against the Hungarians, he will make Görgei believe that he is preparing for his main attack on the northern banks of the Danube. This is why he ordered the IV. (reserve) corps to start a counterattack against the Hungarian troops the next day. Csorich's II. corps and Panyutyin's division were appointed to sustain the attack of the reserve corps. Wohlgemuth decided to use all the Austrian forces under his disposition, ordering, in midnight between 20 and 21 June, to the Perin brigade (3 battalions, 1 cavalry company, 9 cannons) stationed at Sempte and Szered, to destroy the bridge between the two villages, to march through Királyfalva and Pallóc, in order to take the battalion and 1/2 rocket battery from Vágsellye and try to join the Herzinger division which also was called to Pered. On 20 June at the evening a jäger regiment of the Russian Panyutyin division with 1 battery was sent to reinforce the Theissing brigade from Hidaskürt, while the remaining 3 infantry regiments and 3 batteries of the Panyutyin division, as well as the 2 companies of the Civalart uhlans and 4 companies of Austrian cuirassiers with which they were reinforced, had to advance to Taksony. He wanted to force the Hungarians to retreat behind the Vág.

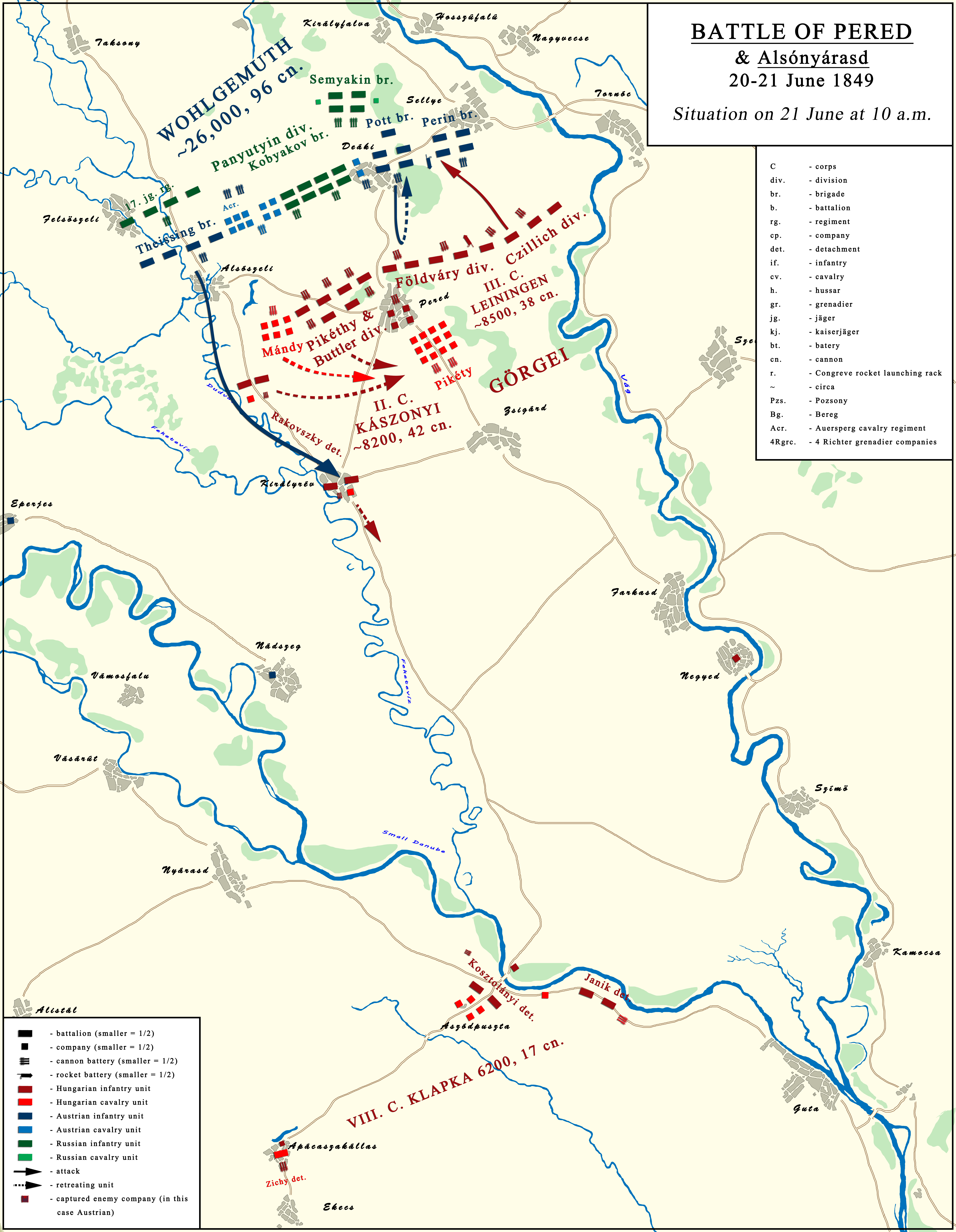
Battle of Pered, 21 June 1849, at 10 a.m

As the Austrian troops advanced from north and northwest the small Hungarians garrisons retreated from Felsőszeli, Alsószeli, and Deáki to Pered.

The battle order of Wohlgemuth's troops, which started their attack on 21 June at 5:00 a.m., was the following:
- on their right wing the Theissing brigade with the Auersperg cuirassier regiment on their left flank, advanced from Hidaskürt through Felsőszeli (where they crossed on the left bank of the Dudvág) towards Alsószeli;
- in the center led by Lieutenant General Feodor Sergeyevich Panyutyin was the Russian Kobyakov brigade, reinforced with 2 batteries, flanked from the right by, 4 and from the left by 2 Austrian cavalry companies, was advancing through Taksony towards Deáki, with the Pott brigade on the left flank of the Russians, and behind Kobyakov and Pott a regiment of the Russian Semyakin brigade with a battery represented the reserve of the center;
- the left flank of Wohlgemuth's army was represented by the Perin brigade, advancing through Vágsellye towards Hetmény.

Learning that Wohlgemuth's main purpose was to attack Pered, Görgei ordered the bulk of the Rakovszky detachment to join the left wing of the II. corps, and the advanced detachment from Deáki to retreat, and join the Hungarian main forces around Pered.

Wohlgemuth's main goal was to cut the retreat route of the Hungarians, and therefore on 21 June the units of his troops had to occupy the village of Királyrév, through which the main Hungarian forces could return to the bridge from Aszódpuszta.

At 10 a.m., after the imperial armies center led by Lieutenant General Panyutyin finished its deployment, the 2 Russian batteries started a harsh cannonade against the Hungarian II. corps and the III. corps left wing, while the cannons of the Pott brigade shoot the III. corps center. Initially, the right wing of the imperials threatened the Hungarian left wing with encirclement, but the stepwise positioning of the cavalry, and the Honvéd troops from Királyrév, prevented this. Wohlgemuth ordered a harsh cannonade from the center and left wing, while one of the two columns of the right wing started an assault against Királyrév, while the other waited outside the range of the Hungarian artillery. The Hungarians responded to the imperial cannonade with shootings, and with the attack of the III. corps, to hinder the enemy artillery fire from the center against the II. corps. But despite the successful advancement of the III. corps, the II. corps seemed to crumble in the heavy enemy fire. Thanks to the effective fire of the Russian batteries, as well as the retreat of the Rakovszky detachment, only weak Hungarian units remained on the left wing of the II. corps, as a result, were easily pushed back towards Királyrév by the Herzinger division. Two battalions of the Hungarian II. corps retreated from the attack of the imperial right wing from Alsószeli to Királyrév. Then the main body of the imperials deployed at Deáki. But the right wing of the II. corps resisted, thanks also to the heroic resistance of the III. corps against the Austrian left wing led by Major General Gustav Ritter von Pott, holding firmly the area in front of Pered. The retreat of the Hungarian left wing caused the turning of the front line from the initial east–west direction to Northeast-Northwest, which was disadvantageous to the Hungarians.

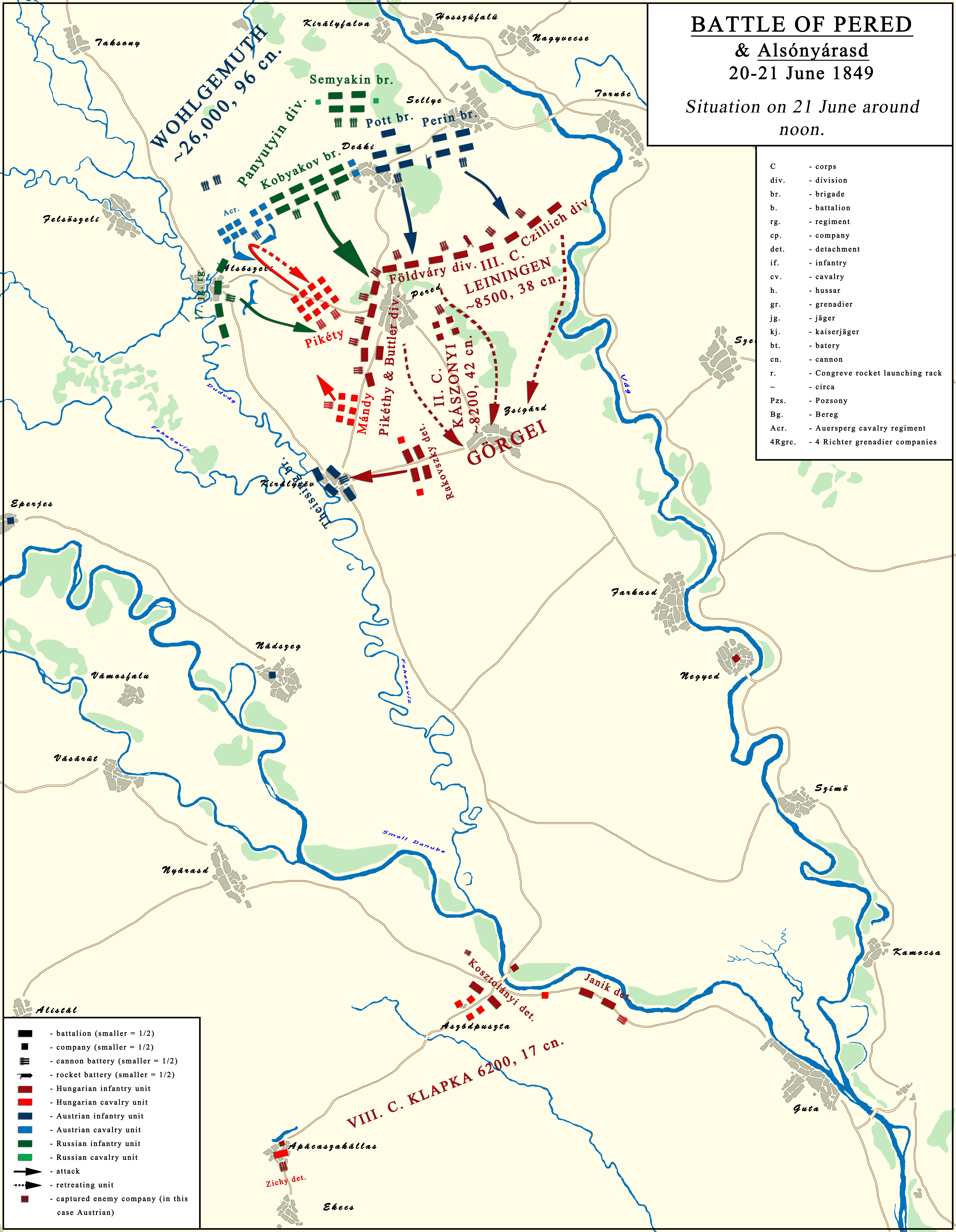
Battle of Pered, 21 June 1849, around noon

Seeing this danger, Görgei, with the purpose to reestablish the order on the left flank, ordered all the cavalry units at his disposition to attack the right flank of the enemy center, and sent again the Rakovszky detachment to Királyrév, to push back the Herzinger division, which approached the village dangerously.

Herzinger, seeing that after the retreat of the Rakovszky detachment towards Pered, only weak Hungarian units remained, turned with part of his troops towards Pered, sending only the Theissing brigade to advance along the Dudvág river, and take Királyrév, task succeeded by Theissing with a single assault, before the arrival of Rakovszky.

In the general cavalry attack against the Austrian center's right wing, ordered by Görgei, participated only the 12 companies of Colonel Pikéthy and the greater part of it with the cavalry battery because meanwhile the 8 cavalry companies of Colonel Mándy were ordered to stop Herzinger, who, as it was mentioned above, turned with a part of his troops, towards Pered. Görgei hoped with this to determine the enemy center to retreat and the isolation of the Theissing brigade from Királyrév.

Colonel Pikéthy led his cavalry against the Austrian cavalry from the right flank of the enemy center led by Lieutenant General Panyutyin. Initially, they were met by 2 companies of the Civalart uhlans and 1 company of Liechtenstein chevau-légers, but very soon from the direction of the Dudvág, the 4 Austrian Auersperg cuirassier companies of the Herzinger division, led by Lieutenant General Burits and General Karl Lederer, supported by the Russian battery, attacked the hussars from the back and sides, forcing them to retreat behind Pered. As a result of the retreat of the hussars, Görgei was forced to withdraw the infantry deployed in front of Pered, mostly its right wing, farther back, to only a couple of hundred paces distance from the village. The retreat, under the lead of General Leiningen, was carried out in order through continuous fighting.

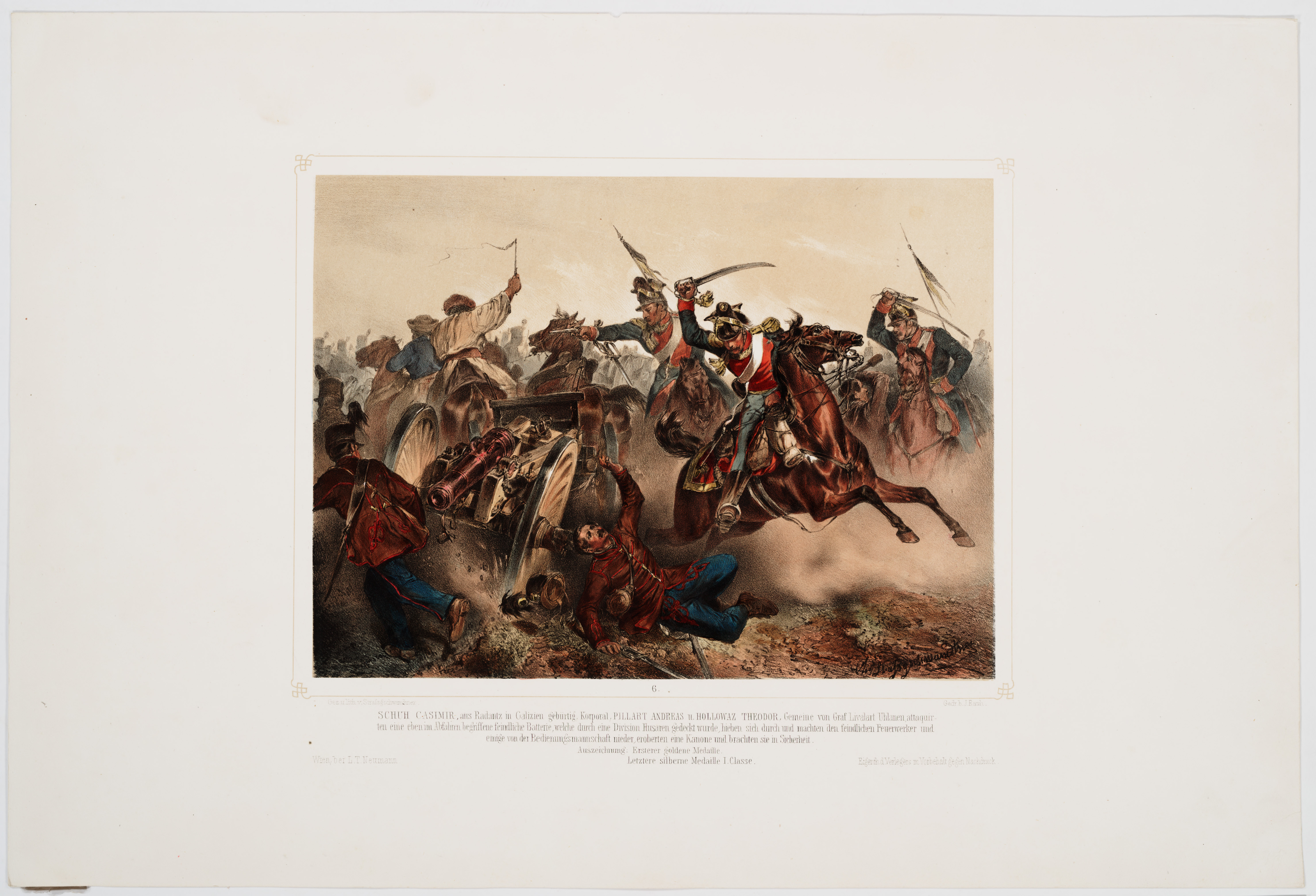
Battle of Pered 21 June 1849 (Anton Strassgschwandtner)

Meanwhile, Wohlgemuth decided to attack Pered. For this purpose, he deployed on the right flank the Russian jäger regiment, the Russian battery, 10 Austrian cannons, and 4 companies of the above-mentioned Auersperg cuirassier regiment led by Lieutenant General Herzinger; on the center, he placed the bulk of the Panyutyin division facing the northern section of Pered, and the Pott brigade the small forest east from the village; while the recently arrived Perin brigade had to encircle the Hungarian right wing.

On the right flank, the troops of Herzinger first came face to face with the 8 hussar companies of Colonel Mándy, who eluded them, considering it too risky to attack the enemy troops which were composed not only of cavalry but also of infantry and artillery, and also wanting not to hinder the artillery of the II. corps in the shooting of the attacking Austrians. When Herzinger approached the Hungarian II. corps left flank, he deployed his cannons, and after short artillery preparation, he sent the Russian jäger regiment to attack. The Russian jägers attack was halted by the effective shootings of the 3 Hungarian battalions installed in the small forest west of Pered, killing the horse of Colonel Baumgarten, and the leader of the 2. battalion Major Kubarkin. But Baumgarten, taking the flag of the 2. battalion in his hands, gave them courage, and started another attack, forcing the 3 Hungarian battalions and the cannons were covering them, to retreat from the forest behind Pered, where Görgei and Colonel Kászonyi tried to restore their broken order.

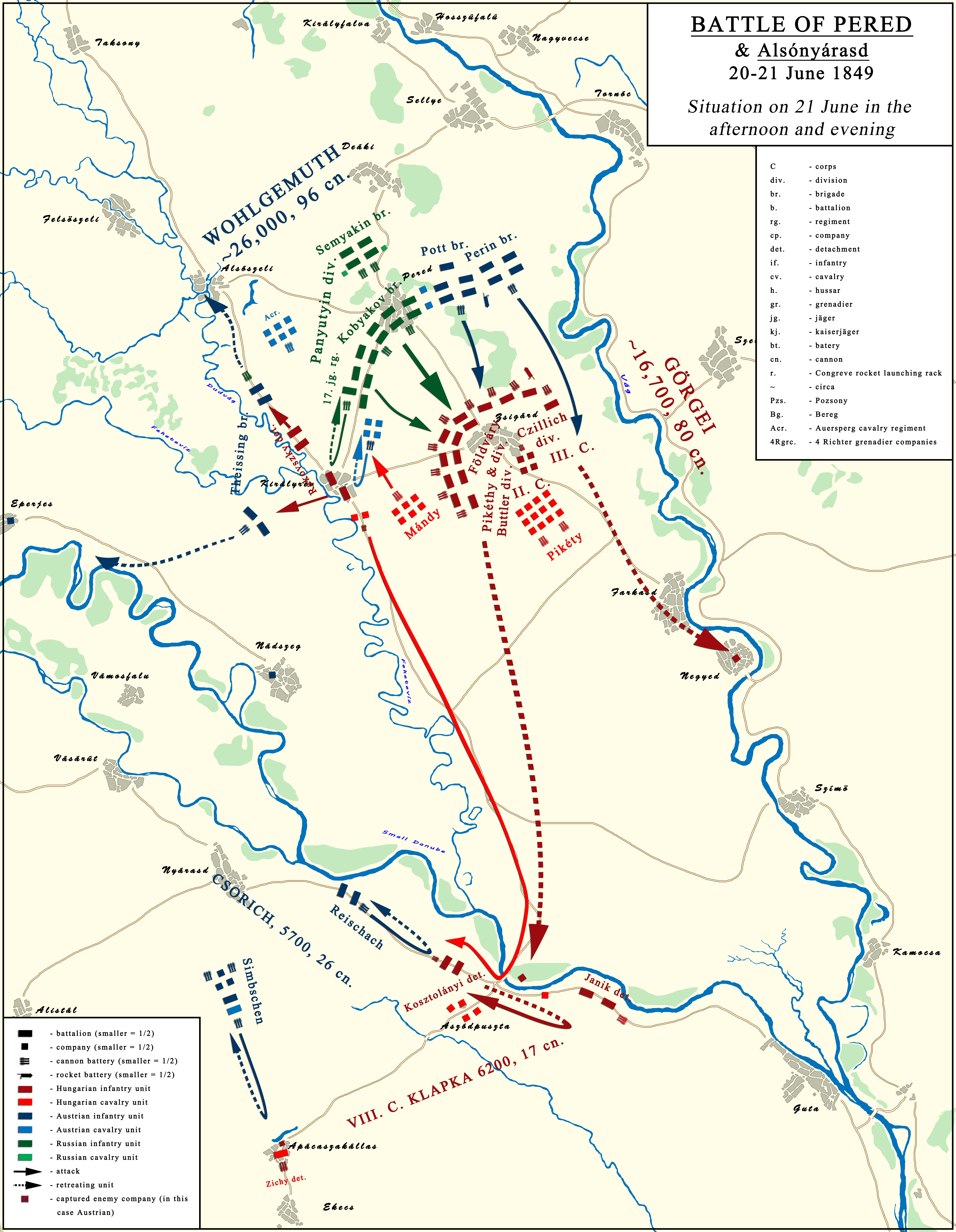
Battle of Pered, 21 June 1849, in the afternoon and evening

Meanwhile, in the center, the frontal attack of Panyutyin's division was carried out with 2 battalions in the first line and another 2 in the second line. The Russians took control of the northern part of Pered, advancing to the church from the center of the village. But here the Hungarians entrenched and barricaded themselves, and with their 4 cannons caused the enemy to stop. But the heroic resistance of the Hungarians was made harder and harder by the rain of Congreve rockets fired by the Pott and Perin brigades, which approached from the east, and Herzinger's units which threatened them with encirclement from the west. This forced Görgei to retreat his center and right wing from the village, and to take a position between Pered and Zsigárd. Thanks to the heroic resistance of the 4 cannons at the church, which remained trapped there, the retreat, and the repositioning of the troops in front of Zsigárd, were carried out in order. To hold their new front line successfully, Görgei ordered that Leiningen's III. corps cavalry division and four battalions to stop the advancement of the imperial cavalry from the right side of the enemy center, and the cavalry of the II. the division which previously was held back by the Russian infantry division, to attack the enemy troops advancing from the extreme right wing of Wohlgemuth's army, to ease the tasks of the II. corps infantry and the III. corps cavalry. He also ordered, that if the III. corps would be pushed back, it can retreat only to Zsigárd, where they should take the artillery of the II. corps, which retreated there because of their shortage of ammunition, and to hold there until Királyrév is recaptured. Colonel Kászonyi with the II. corps had to defend the III. corps left from encirclement and to keep contact with the troops which tried to take back Királyrév. Görgei hoped that with the II. and the III. corps in front of Zsigárd, he will wait until the Rakovszky detachment will take back Királyrév, and the I. corps led by General Nagysándor will appear at the back of the enemy troops, and then he will start a counter-attack, and win the battle.

While Leiningen was busy forming the Hungarian resistance between Pered and Zsigárd, Görgei rode towards Királyrév. He wanted to see if any enemy troops are coming from the direction of Csallóköz, which could put in danger the recapture of Királyrév. After he saw that his troops would not be attacked from there - because Klapka managed to hold the position there - he went to the Rakovszky detachment to order them to attack Királyrév. He saw here that many of the soldiers and even some officers hid in the cornfield nearby instead of attacking. He disciplined them, then sent them to join the attack then he returned to the main battlefield, letting the Rakovszky detachment carry out this task. Rakovszky led his detachment of 4 infantry battalions, 4 cannons, and 2 hussar companies against the Theissing brigade which was holding Királyrév, with such vigor and determination, that the Austrians broke in two, one half of them retreating along the Dudvág to Alsószeli, while the other half crossed the Feketevíz (the southern section of the Dudvág) fleeing towards Tallós, chased by Rakovszky's units, which started the crossing of the bridge from Aszódpuszta. From here the two Károlyi hussar companies to the Aszód bridge to reinforce Klapka's troops from there. Herzinger sent a Russian battalion and 4 cannons to support Theissing, but when they arrived in the neighborhood of Királyrév, they saw that the Hungarians already captured the village. Being informed about this, Lieutenant General Wohlgemuth wanted to send Herzinger with the troops which he led in his attack against Pered, to reunite them with the Theissing brigade, and to recapture with them Királyrév, but the renewed attacks of the Hungarian cavalry units led by Colonel Mándy prevented Herzinger to approach Királyrév. Finally, the counter-attack of the Austrian cavalry pushed the hussars back, but Királyrév remained in Hungarian hands.

Hearing about the recapture of Királyrév, Görgei sent an order to General Leiningen to start again the attack against Pered, but in the meanwhile, the imperial troops led by Panyutyin, Pott, and Perin started again the attack, which was halted after the capture of the village. The II. corps was forced by Austrian and Russian troops to retreat to Királyrév, and the news coming from Leiningen wasn't good either, the III. corps got around from right by a strong enemy column, so he had to order the retreat from Zsigárd towards Farkasd. Hearing this news, Görgei understood that he had lost the right banks of the Vág river and with this the battle. The III. corps retreated through Farkasd and Negyed to the left bank of the Vág, while the II. corps on the bridge from Seregakol to Csallóköz. The III. corps was pursued by the Pott and Perin brigades, while the Panyutyin division tried to attack them from the left flank, but they were halted by one of the Vág's backwaters. Thanks to this Leiningen crossed the Vág that night without any problem, while the rearguard of his corps held Negyed until the morning of 22 June, and only after their retreat Pott's brigade occupied it without a fight. Kászonyi's II. corps also retreated without major problems, and arrived, together with General Görgei, in Aszód at 8:00 p.m. Only a Russian battalion, a cuirassier company and 2 cannons followed them until Seregakol, where the bridge, as well as the one from Negyed, was destroyed by the retreating Hungarians, before the enemies arrival.

==== Military actions related to the battle on 21 June ====
In the same way as during the first day of the battle, in the regions in which lay the marching and retreat routes of the troops', on 21 June there occurred some greater or lesser military actions and clashes between the two sides.

In the Csallóköz region, the military actions developed as follows. On 20 June, Field Marshal Haynau ordered Lieutenant General Csorich to support Wohlgemuth's attack against Pered the next day by sending the bulk of the Liebler infantry brigade and the Simbschen cavalry brigade along the Danube's Érsekújvár branch through Nádszeg to Seregakol, to threaten the Hungarians from the rear and side, which could have been fatal for the II. Hungarian corps, if we regard the final result of the battle on 21 June. The same detachment had to carry out a demonstration in force from Vásárút towards Aszód. But Lieutenant General Anton Csorich confined himself only to a demonstration in Csallóköz on the afternoon of 21 June, explaining later that he had insufficient troops and the distance which they had to overcome was too long.

Around the bridge of Aszód, the Battle of Alsónyárasd continued this day too, Klapka managing to hold the bridge against the attacks, of the Austrian troops led by Lieutenant General Anton Csorich. Thanks to this, the II. Hungarian corps crossed the bridge from Aszód without any problem, then Klapka ordered the destruction of the bridge to prevent the enemy from crossing the Érsekújvár Danube branch.

Colonel Horváth with his detachment remained at Galgóc, and with his superior troops demonstrated before the minor Austrian outposts, instead of crossing the Vág, and helping the II. and III. corps in the battle of Pered.

One of the causes of the defeat was that General József Nagysándor, who had the task to cross with the I. corps the Vág at Szered and to hold the Austrian units there, did not observe that these enemy units left that place and joined Wohlgemuth's main troops, to support the attack in the main front. He remained in his position, demonstrating, in the same way as Colonel Horváth, in front of the small Austrian units instead of attacking, even though Görgei ordered him to cross the now undefended Vág river, and attack from the side and behind the enemy troops, which could have brought the victory to Hungarians. Due to the inactivity of Nagysándor the numerically much superior Austro-Russian troops managed to chase the Hungarian troops from the positions they occupied the day before. Görgei had no choice but to order the Hungarian retreat. He sent Leiningen a messenger with the order to continue its retreat, crossing the Vág river, but he held Királyrév for a while until the units of lieutenant-colonel Rakovszky which were pursuing the enemy troops chased out of the village turned back. Until this happened, Colonel Kászonyi, with the cavalry battery of the II. corps attacked the enemy troops which were moving towards Királyrév. After all detached troops arrived, Görgei ordered the retreat of the II. corps too, towards the bridge of Aszódpuszta.

== Aftermath ==
The casualties:
The Hungarians:
At Pered:
- III. corps:

- Dead: 4 officers and 77 soldiers;
- Wounded: 7 officers and 111 soldiers;
- Missing: 1 officer and 324 soldiers;
- Cannons: 9;

- II. corps:

- Dead, wounded, missing: 2000 men (the majority of them, during the battle fled away from the battlefield, and after its end returned to the army);
- Cannons: 4;

In the battles from Csallóköz:
- VIII. corps:

- Dead: 45 men;
- Wounded: 62 men;
- Missing: 192 men;
- Cannons: 2;
- Ammunition wagons: 3;
- Horses: 135;

The Austrians:
At Pered:

- Dead: 2 officers and 89 soldiers;
- Wounded: 9 officers and 236 soldiers;
- Missing: 2 officers and 120 soldiers;
- Horses: 160;

In the battles from Csallóköz:
- II. corps:

- Dead: 1 officers and 8 soldiers;
- Wounded: 9 officer and 236 soldiers;
- Horses: 135;

The Russians:
At Pered:

- Dead: 3 officers and 31 soldiers;
- Wounded: 29 men;
- Missing: 5 men;
- Horses: 40.

The Hungarian historian Róbert Hermann writes in one of his studies, that during the battles around Zsigárd and Pered between 16 and 21 June, General Artúr Görgei committed one of the few great mistakes of his military career: the Hungarian main commander chose on 16 June not to command directly from the battlefield the actions of his new, inexperienced corps commanders, who because of this failed to coordinate their actions and were defeated, with this letting the opportunity to win the battle to slip. Later he apologized himself writing that he wanted to put his new army corps commanders to the proof, but the importance of this battle for the future of the Hungarian revolutionary state was too high for such a risk. In the Spring campaign, when the commanders of the corps were very talented and experienced generals, like Damjanich and Klapka, Görgei was every time nearby, but now when the new commanders were commanding for the first time an army corps, and when their tasks were far more difficult than the former corps commanders had in the Spring Campaign, Görgei did not support them. Another mistake of Görgei was the replacement of Colonel Lajos Asbóth, the most successful army corps commander on the first day of the Battle of Pered, 20 June with Colonel József Kászonyi, whose performance eased the task of the enemy forces to win the battle. But during the battle of Pered Görgei showed great efficiency as high commander, turning several times the fate of the battle by reorganizing his retreating troops and putting them to attack again. But he could not be in every place at the same time to hold the battle together, while his chief of the general staff, Colonel József Bayer did not show up to help him, remaining in his bureau.

The majority of the Hungarian corps commanders (Knezić, Nagysándor, Kászonyi, and also the experienced Klapka) failed to do their best to help their troops to win the victory. They showed incapacity of cooperation, and this affected also their subordinate officers, who see this, and their failures, and lost their morale. Another problem that affected the Hungarian troops was the shortage of ammunition, which persisted since the Battle of Isaszeg, despite that the commanders demanded many times continuously from the Hungarian government to send them the much-needed ammunition. But not only the Hungarian Government was guilty of that (because of the deficiencies in the transport, and its organization), but because of the running out of their stocks and resources. At the end of May 1849, the gunpowder production completely stopped, and the Hungarian army was forced to use the 900 kg reserves from the fort of Pétervárad. The situation wasn't better concerning the bayonets, steel for swords, and other weapons and supplies. Because of this, they had not enough weapons to give to the newly conscripted rookies. The Hungarian military industry, weapon, and ammunition production started to be built only a year before, and that, because of the problems which usually occur at the start of everything new, corroborated with the lack of experience of the workers and their leading staff, wasn't enough to produce the ammunition and armament needed for a, since a year ongoing war. Besides this, the continuous changing in the front line, the occupation of the enemy forces, of the cities in which the ammunition and weapon manufacturers were working, or where the weapon and armament depots were, or only if these places threatened to be occupied by the nearing troops, caused them to stop temporary or permanently. For example, right when György Lahner finished the building of a gunpowder manufacture and a cannon foundry at Nagyvárad, in the summer of 1849, the town started to be threatened by the nearing of the Russian troops, and because of this the production did not start

Hermann writes that, from the perspective of the Hungarians, Wohlgemuth and Panyutyin acted with great will and energy, while Csorich was not very active. The Austro-Russian brigade commanders fulfilled their duties with efficiency.

Although the battle was not a very serious blow to the Hungarian army and their strategical positions, the Hungarians did not lose their military initiative completely, but the moral effect of the two lost battles (Zsigárd on 16 June, and Pered at 20–21 June) had a paralyzing effect on their morale, while the imperials who in the Spring campaign lost every battle started again to believe in victory. But the imperials could have been not achieve this victory without the involvement in the battle of Panyutyin's Russian troops.

After this battle, due to the inefficiency of their reconnaissance, the Hungarians could not learn about Haynau's plans to attack the southern banks of the Danube, so he could continue to move his troops on the other side of the great river, to start an attack towards the Hungarian troops at Győr, then to advance towards Komárom and the Hungarian capitals (Buda and Pest). With the attack, which resulted in the Hungarian defeat at Pered, Görgei unwillingly helped Haynau to conceal, from his eyes, the transfer of the Austrian troops to the right bank of the Danube, and maintain the belief that the enemy will start its offensive on the left bank.

== Sources ==
- Bánlaky, József (2001). A magyar nemzet hadtörténelme ("The Military History of the Hungarian Nation) (in Hungarian). Budapest: Arcanum Adatbázis.
- Bona, Gábor (1996). Az 1848–1849-es szabadságharc története ("The history of the Hungarian War of Independence of 1848–1849) (in Hungarian). Budapest. ISBN 963-8218-20-7.
- Bóna, Gábor (1987). Tábornokok és törzstisztek a szabadságharcban 1848–49 ("Generals and Staff Officers in the War of Independence 1848–1849") (in Hungarian). Budapest: Zrínyi Katonai Kiadó. p. 430. ISBN 963-326-343-3.
- Gelich, Rikhárd (1889). Magyarország függetlenségi harcza 1848-49-ben, III. kötet ("The Independence Struggle of Hungary in 1848-49, vol. 3.) (in Hungarian). Budapest: Aigner Lajos.
- Hermann, Róbert (2001). Az 1848–1849-es szabadságharc hadtörténete ("Military History of the Hungarian War of Independence of 1848–1849") (in Hungarian). Budapest: Korona Kiadó. p. 424. ISBN 963-9376-21-3.
- Hermann, Róbert (2004). Az 1848–1849-es szabadságharc nagy csatái ("Great battles of the Hungarian War of Independence of 1848–1849") (in Hungarian). Budapest: Zrínyi. p. 408. ISBN 963-327-367-6.
- Hermann, Róbert (1993), "Görgei Artúr, a hadvezér" (PDF), Új Honvédségi Szemle
- Hermann, Róbert (2013). Nagy csaták. 16. A magyar függetlenségi háború ("Great Battles. 16. The Hungarian Freedom War") (in Hungarian). Budapest: Duna Könyvklub. p. 88. ISBN 978-615-5129-00-1.
- Kemény, Krisztián (2018), ""Tüntetés" a fővezér ellen? Görgei Artúr, Asbóth Lajos és a II. hadtest tisztikarának nyilatkozata - 1849. június 22." (PDF), Aetas
- Pusztaszeri, László (1984). Görgey Artúr a szabadságharcban ("Artúr Görgey in the War of Independence") (in Hungarian). Budapest: Magvető Könyvkiadó. p. 784. ISBN 963-14-0194-4.
- Rüstow, Friedrich Wilhelm (1866). Az 1848-1849-diki magyar hadjárat története, II. kötet ("The History of the Hungarian Campaign from 1848-1849, vol. 2.) (in Hungarian). Pest: Emich Gusztáv.
