= Fedor Panyutin =

Russian military commander

Fedor Sergeyevich Panyutin
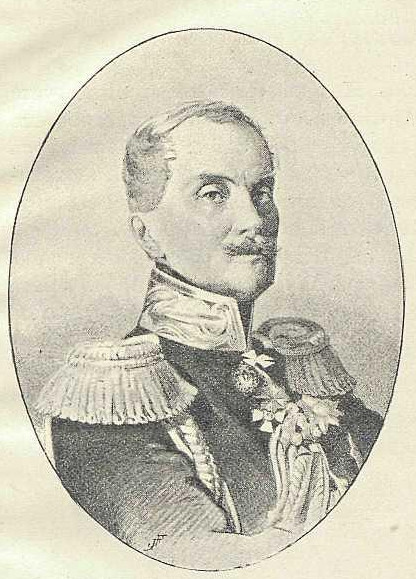
- Born: May 10, 1790
- Died: May 31, 1865 (aged 75)
- Allegiance: Russia; Austria
- Branch: Imperial Russian Army
- Commands: 113th Starorus Russian Infantry Regiment
- Conflicts: Napoleonic Wars; French invasion of Russia; War of the Sixth Coalition; Russo-Turkish War (1828-29); November Uprising; Kraków uprising; Hungarian Revolution of 1848; Crimean War

Fedor Sergeyevich Panyutin (Russian: Фёдор Сергеевич Панютин, romanized: Fyodor Sergeyevich Panyutin; May 10, 1790 – May 31, 1865) was a Russian general, Warsaw military governor, and member of the State Council. During the Hungarian Revolution of 1848, he rendered pleasant service under the able Austrian commander Julius Jacob von Haynau, as well as at Pered.

== Biography ==
The son of a retired guards warrant officer Sergei Fedorovich Panyutin and Nadezhda Fedorovna, née Kozlova; Panyutin's birth date is not exactly known, most likely (on the tombstone) on May 10, 1790.

=== Napoleonic Wars ===
After receiving his initial home education, he was determined to be in the Page Corps in 1807, where he graduated from the training course in 1809 and was released on May 12 as a warrant officer in the Life Guards. Semenovsky regiment. Produced on May 1, 1811, as second lieutenant, Panyutin, together with the Semenovsky regiment, participated in many battles of the Patriotic War of 1812. As part of the 1st Army, he participated in the retreat from the border and many rear-guard battles. In the battle of Borodino on August 24 and 25 he was in the army reserve, and on the day of August 26 — in the battle itself; then he was under Tarutino and Maloyaroslavets. In exactly the same way, he was also at the passage of troops through the Neman, participated in the battles at Lutzen, Bautzen, Pirna, Kulm and the Battle of Leipzig (where he was shell-shocked with a core in his right leg) in 1813, and, finally, during the capture of Paris on March 18, 1814, of the year. For all these battles, he received the Order of St. Anne of the 3rd degree "For Courage" (May 9, 1813, for distinction under Bautzen), St. Vladimir of the 4th degree with a bow (September 15, 1813) and the Prussian Order "Pour le Mérite" (for distinction under Kulm) and on September 23, 1813, was promoted to lieutenant.

At the end of his foreign campaigns, Panyutin continued to serve in the Semenovsky regiment until 1820, and during this time he received the ranks of staff captain (March 14, 1816), captain (June 8, 1817) and colonel (December 15, 1819). On November 2, 1820, Panyutin was transferred after the well-known story with Colonel Schwartz to the Sevsky Infantry Regiment, in which on July 4, 1822, he was appointed commander of the battalion. September 18, 1826, Panyutin was given command of the Rylsky Infantry Regiment.

=== Russo-Turkish War ===
Conducted as a major general on September 29, 1828, Panyutin was appointed commander of the 2nd Brigade of the 20th Infantry Division and, in the war with Turkey that arose in 1828, together with the entire division, was aimed at strengthening the forces of the separate Caucasian corps acting against Turkey from Asia Minor. Panyutin participated in a stubborn battle at Bayazet, which lasted 32 hours, and was badly wounded by a bullet in the thigh of his right leg. For the excellent courage shown in this battle, he was awarded the Order of St. George of the 3rd class No. 421 on January 19, 1830 "In return for the distinction made in the war against the Turks of 1829, during the two-day defense of the Bayazet fortress against the numerous corps of Wanskago Pasha, he was seriously injured and after dressing with the help of people again appeared in business and remained until the end of the onago" The wound received by Panyutin deprived him of the opportunity to participate in further hostilities of the Turkish War, which ended in peace on October 1, 1829. At the conclusion of peace, the troops of the 20th Division returned to the Caucasian line and were sent by the commander in chief in the Caucasus (at that time Count Paskevich) to conquer the hostile peoples of Russia that inhabited the Caucasus Mountains, especially on the Pshebsu River to act against the Shapsugs.

=== Uprising in Poland ===
The uprising in the Kingdom of Poland that broke out in November 1830 forced him to send the Russian army under the command of Field Marshal Dibich-Zabalkansky to Poland. Panyutin was with him at that time and, following the army, was captured by the rebels, in which he remained from June 8 to August 20, 1831, and then, together with a small detachment entrusted to him (regiments of the Sevsky infantry and Lubensky hussars with 4 guns), occupied the town of Petrikau until the very end of this war in 1831. For the difference in this campaign he was awarded the 2nd degree Virtuti militari badge. Commanding after the 1st Brigade of the 6th Infantry Division (from September 16, 1831), and then the 8th Infantry Division (from October 15, 1834), Panyutin stood within the former Kingdom of Poland not far from the Austrian border. October 27, 1834, received the Order of St. Anna of the 1st degree. The riots in Galicia and the city of Kraków were the reason that a special detachment of Russian troops from Kielce, under the command of Panyutin, was sent to Austria, occupied Kraków, and then, after restoring order, returned to the Kingdom of Poland. April 18, 1834, promoted to lieutenant general. On September 7, 1839, he was awarded the Order of St. Vladimir of the 2nd degree, and on February 15, 1846, he received the Order of the White Eagle (Russian Empire).

=== Revolution in Hungary ===
In 1848, an uprising broke out in Hungary, putting Austria in an extremely difficult position. The rescue of Vienna from death, according to Prince Schwarzenberg (in his letter to Paskevich), consisted solely in the immediate appearance of Russian troops on the right wing of the Hungarians (who had already captured Komorn on the Danube). The Austrian emperor, Schwarzenberg wrote, cannot doubt the intention of his august ally, but he fears only that the news of the current state of affairs can reach his majesty only when it is too late to help with forces that would now be enough.

Paskevich, who at that time was the viceroy of the Kingdom of Poland, was not slow to report his majesty, but meanwhile he received new, more urgent requests for immediate help from the Austrian government, as Hungarian troops under the command of Artúr Görgei were already approaching Vienna. Paskevich, not doubting the firm intention of his sovereign to help Austria, which was in danger of imminent death, sent, not expecting a special high command, a separate detachment of 4 infantry and 2 cavalry regiments under the command of Panyutin to strengthen the 7th Corps of the Austrian army most threatened by the Hungarians. Panyutin immediately moved with the division by rail from Kraków to Vienna and, arriving the next day to Uherské Hradiště (between Olomouc and Hodonín), stopped at the request of the Austrians (April 30, 1849), and then moved to join them, since while the Hungarian troops engaged in a siege of Ofen, and the Austrian commander Welden (soon replaced by Field Marshal Baron Haynau) intended to go on the offensive. Panyutin moved through Wartenberg to Diosek, where the Austrian army was, and was supposed to be with the main army until its rapprochement with the army of Paskevich.

Artúr Görgei intended to defeat the Austrians before joining them with the Russian troops, but he did not succeed, because in the battle of June 8 (20) near Pered, the Russian troops of Panyutin brought the Austrians a victory, very important for them: they were temporarily secured from attacks by the Hungarians and could concentrate their troops on the right bank of the Danube for action on Raab and Pest. Panyutin at the same time burned another bridge over the river Váh at Neded. For this brilliant work, he was made adjutant general of his majesty, while the Austrian emperor awarded him the Order of the Iron Crown (Austria) of the 1st degree.

After this battle, Görgei retreated to Komorn, a strong fortress on the Danube, which was soon approached by the Austrian troops. Haynau, counting on the superiority of his forces, wished for a decisive battle that took place on June 20 (July 2) and was at first unfavorable for the Austrians, but Panyutin quickly, having moved to their aid, with his successful orders during the battle, delivered the opportunity to defeat the Hungarians, who retreated and locked themselves in the fortress. Their leader Görgei was wounded by a saber in the head, and Klapka took command of the Hungarian forces.

After this, Haynau, through Ofen and Pest, moved his troops to the left bank of the Danube to go to the lower Tisza and act against the Hungarian militia. At the same time, the Battle of Temesvár occurred, in which Panyutin again rendered a great service in that, having timely taken an important place in Besenovo, he made it possible for the Austrians to defeat the Hungarians, after which their southern army ceased to exist. Panyutin was awarded the Order of St. Alexander Nevsky on August 22, 1849, for his participation and order in this matter. The Austrians, in a report on this battle, completely ignored the participation that fell to him, but nevertheless gave him the knighthood of the military order of Maria Theresa.

Meanwhile, Görgei's army surrendered to Paskevich, and Panyutin was ordered to join the main Russian army with the troops entrusted to him, which ended this two-month campaign, after which Panyutin returned to the fatherland and was appointed commander of the 2nd Infantry Corps on August 11, 1849. December 6, 1851, promoted to general of infantry. May 28, 1851, received diamond signs for the Order of St. Alexander Nevsky.

During the upcoming Crimean War, during the formation of the Middle Army in the South-Western Territory in 1855, Panyutin was appointed commander of it, but had no chance to take an active part in Russian struggle with the Anglo-French troops: the army entrusted to him had the purpose, except for guarding the region, to serve the main reserve for Russian troops operating both on the Danube and near Sevastopol. On August 26, 1856, Panyutin was awarded the Order of St. Vladimir of the 1st degree for ordering and the formation of necessary reinforcements, and during the disbandment of this army after the conclusion of the Paris Peace, he was appointed Warsaw Military Governor and, at the same time, present in the Warsaw Departments of the Senate.

From September 26, 1858, Panyutin was the chief of the Alexopol Infantry Regiment and since 1859 was on the lists of the Life Guards Semenovsky Regiment.

Later, on April 23, 1861, Panyutin was appointed a member of the Council of State. Frustrated by his health, in 1865 he was forced to ask for his leave on leave abroad, but, having received permission on May 10, 1865, he soon died - May 31 (June 12), 1865. He was buried in Vilna in the Church of St. Euphrosyne.

== Military ranks ==
- Warrant Officer of the Guard (05/12, 1809)
- Second Lieutenant of the Guard (05/01/1811)
- Lieutenant of the Guard (09/23/1813)
- Headquarters Captain (03/14/1816)
- Captain (06/08/1817)
- Colonel (December 15, 1819)
- Major General (August 29, 1828)
- Lieutenant General (04/18/1837)
- Adjutant General for the distinction in the assault the Pered village (06/15/1849)
- General of Infantry (12/06/1851)

== Awards ==
=== Russian ===
- Order of St. Anna, 3rd degree (05/09, 1813)
- Order of St. Vladimir 4th degree with bow (September 15, 1813)
- Order of St. George 3rd degree for the defense of the Bayazet fortress (January 19, 1830)
- Polish insignia "For military dignity", 2nd degree for the distinction in the suppression of the Polish rebellion (1831)
- Order of St. Anna 1st degree for excellent diligent service and "especially for the approximate performance" of duties of a member of the Supreme Criminal Court in Warsaw (October 27, 1834)
- Order of St. Vladimir, 2nd degree with bow (09/07, 1839)
- Snuffbox with the monogram of the Name of His Majesty (1840)
- Order of the White Eagle for the suppression of the Kraków rebellion (February 15, 1846)
- Snuffbox with a portrait of His Majesty Emperor Nicholas I for the suppression of the Kraków rebellion (1846)
- Order of St. Alexander Nevsky for the Hungarian campaign (August 22, 1849)
- Diamond signs to the Order of St. Alexander Nevsky (May 28, 1851)
- Order of St. Vladimir 1st degree with swords (1856)
- Insignia "For XL Years of Immaculate Service" (1857)

=== Foreign ===
- Prussian Order "Pour le Mérite" for distinction under Kulm (1813)
- Prussian Kulm Cross (1813)
- Austrian Order of the Iron Crown 1st degree for the distinction in the assault the Pered village (1849)
- Austrian Military Order of Maria Theresa 3rd degree (1849)
- The Dutch Military Order of William of the 3rd degree (1849)
- Snuffbox with a portrait of His Majesty the Austrian Emperor Franz Joseph I, decorated with diamonds (1850)
- Austrian Order of Leopold, Grand Cross (1850)
- Prussian Order of the Red Eagle 1st degree (1851)
- Diamond signs to the Prussian Order of the Red Eagle (1858)
- Prussian Order of the Black Eagle (1860)
- Austrian Order of St. Stephen, the Great Cross (1860)
- Crown of the Prussian Order of Pour le Mérite (1864)

== Family ==
Fedor Sergeyevich Panyutin was married to Nadezhda Evgrafovna Merlina. Their children:

- Sergei (?-?)
- Love (1821-1885)
- Stepan (1822-1885) - Governor of Vilna
- Paul (1824—?)
- Nikolai (1825—?)
- Alexandra (1829—?)
- Vsevolod (1833–1895) - lieutenant general
- Alexander (1834-1870)

Military offices
Preceded by Nekrasov, Nikolai Mikhailovich	Commander of the 113th Starorus Russian Infantry Regiment; 1826-1828	Succeeded by Bessonov, Ivan Ivanovich

== Bibliography ==
- Панютин, Федор Сергеевич // Русский биографический словарь: в 25 томах. — Санкт-Петербург Москва, 1896—1918.
- "Панютин, Федор Сергеевич". Brockhaus and Efron Encyclopedic Dictionary: In 86 Volumes (82 Volumes and 4 Additional Volumes) (in Russian). St. Petersburg: F. A. Brockhaus. 1890–1907.
- Encyclopedia of Military and Naval Sciences, edited by G. A. Leer. T. V. - St. Petersburg, 1891.
- Fedor Sergeevich Panyutin (with attachment of documents) // Russian Archive. - 1891. - No. 5.
- Bersenev V.V. Biographical information on governors-general and governors // Institute of Governor-General and Viceroyalty in the Russian Empire. T. 1. - St. Petersburg., 2001.
- Shilov D.N., Kuzmin Yu.A. Members of the State Council of the Russian Empire. 1801-1906: A Bibliographic Reference. - SPb., 2007.
