= Horné Saliby =

Horné Saliby Felsőszeli
- Municipality
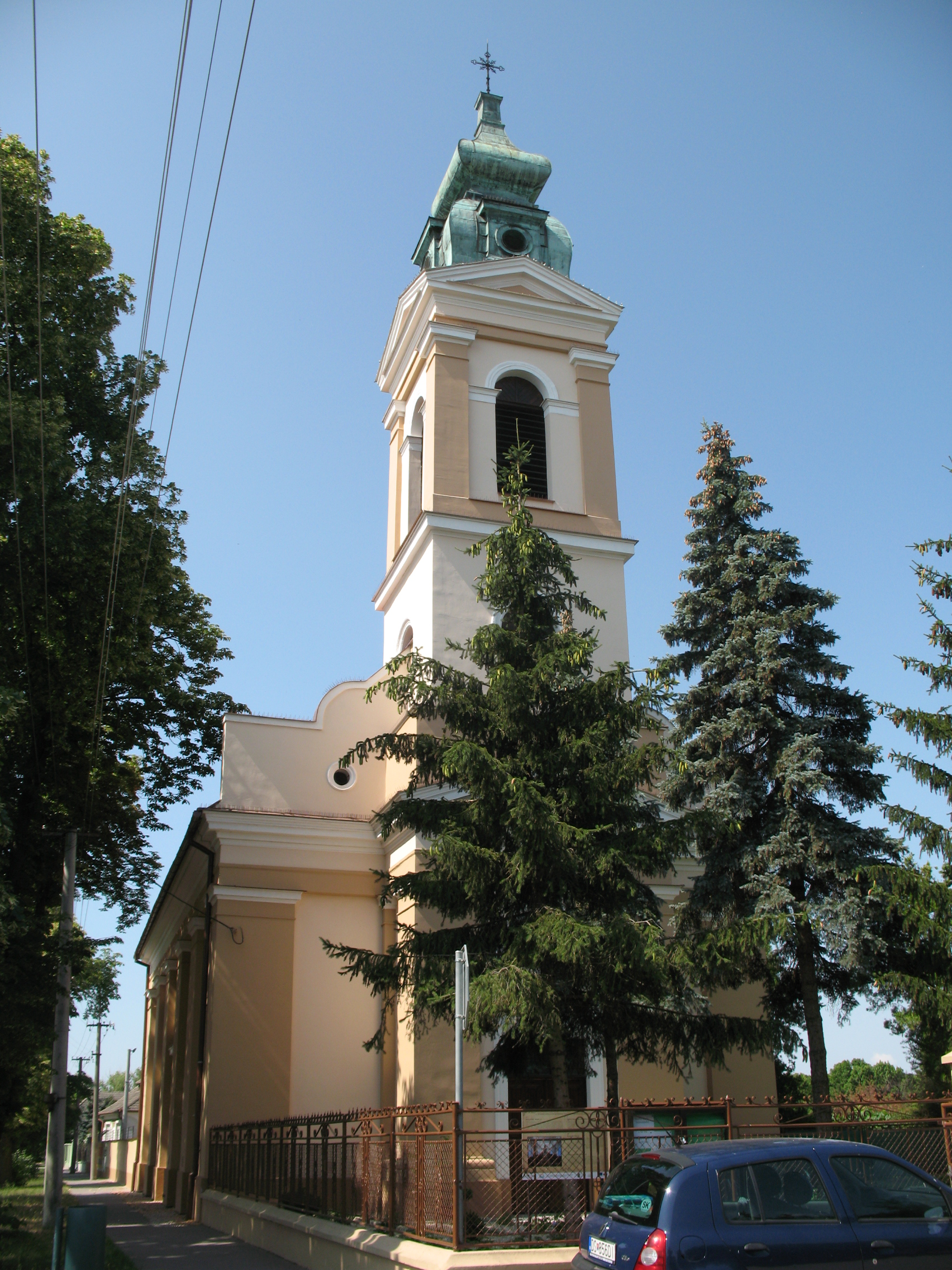

- Flag

- Location of Horné Saliby in the Trnava Region Location of Horné Saliby in Slovakia
- Coordinates: 48.12°N 17.75°E
- Country: Slovakia
- Region: Trnava Region
- District: Galanta District
- First mentioned: 1233

Government
  - Mayor: Pál Dobosy

Area
  - Total: 34.83 km^{2} (13.45 sq mi)
- Elevation: 115 m (377 ft)

Population (2025)
  - Total: 3,152
- Time zone: UTC+1 (CET)
  - Summer (DST): UTC+2 (CEST)
- Postal code: 925 03
- Area code: +421 31
- Vehicle registration plate (until 2022): GA
- Website: www.hornesaliby.sk

Horné Saliby (Hungarian: Felsőszeli) is a village and municipality in Galanta District of the Trnava Region of south-west Slovakia.

== Geography ==
The municipality lies at an altitude of 115 metres (377 ft) and covers an area of 34.83 km^{2} (13.45 sq mi) (2025).

== History ==
The territory was already a part of the Kingdom of Great Moravia, the first Slavic state ever, when, after weakening battles with the Frankish Empire, in the 9th century, the eastern part of Great Moravia was occupied by nomadic Magyar tribes. The territory of Horné Saliby became part of the Kingdom of Hungary, later acknowledged by the Frankish Empire. In historical records the village was first mentioned in 1233. Before the establishment of independent Czechoslovakia in 1918, it was part of Pozsony County. After the Austro-Hungarian army disintegrated in November 1918, Czechoslovak troops occupied the area, later acknowledged internationally by the Treaty of Trianon. Between 1938 and 1945 Horné Saliby once more became part of Miklós Horthy's Hungary through the First Vienna Award. From 1945 until the Velvet Divorce, it was part of Czechoslovakia. Since then it has been part of Slovakia.

== Population ==
Population statistic (10 years)
Year	1995	2005	2015	2025
Count	3059	3149	3281	3152
Difference		+2.94%	+4.19%	−3.93%

Population statistic
Year	2024	2025
Count	3169	3152
Difference		−0.53%

It has a population of 3152 people (31 December 2025).

=== Ethnicity ===
Census 2021 (1+ %)
Ethnicity	Number	Fraction
Hungarian	1877	58.69%
Slovak	1247	38.99%
Not found out	167	5.22%
Total	3198	

In year 2021 was 3198 people by ethnicity 1877 as Hungarian, 1247 as Slovak, 167 as Not found out, 16 as Czech, 15 as Vietnamese, 10 as Ukrainian, 9 as Other, 4 as Romani, 4 as Russian, 2 as Serbian, 2 as Rusyn, 1 as Jewish, 1 as Moravian, 1 as French and 1 as Croatian.

Note on population: The difference values of population numbers in the table "Population statistic" and in the sections "Ethnicity" & "Religion" is caused by the use of various statistical methods.

=== Religion ===
Census 2021 (1+ %)
Religion	Number	Fraction
Roman Catholic Church	1331	41.62%
None	842	26.33%
Evangelical Church	754	23.58%
Not found out	145	4.53%
Total	3198	

In year 2021 was 3198 people by religion 1331 from Roman Catholic Church, 842 from None, 754 from Evangelical Church, 145 from Not found out, 29 from Calvinist Church, 24 from Greek Catholic Church, 14 from United Methodist Church, 12 from Eastern Orthodox Church, 11 from Other and not ascertained christian church, 11 from Jehovah's Witnesses, 7 from Ad hoc movements, 6 from Other, 5 from Apostolic Church, 3 from Christian Congregations in Slovakia, 2 from Buddhism, 1 from Old Catholic Church and 1 from Czechoslovak Hussite Church.

== Genealogical resources ==
The records for genealogical research are available at the state archive "Statny Archiv in Bratislava, Nitra, Slovakia"

- Roman Catholic church records (births/marriages/deaths): 1678-1931 (parish A)
- Lutheran church records (births/marriages/deaths): 1786-1916 (parish A)
- Reformated church records (births/marriages/deaths): 1792-1896 (parish B)

== See also ==
- List of municipalities and towns in Slovakia
