= Kráľov Brod =

Kráľov Brod Királyrév
- Municipality
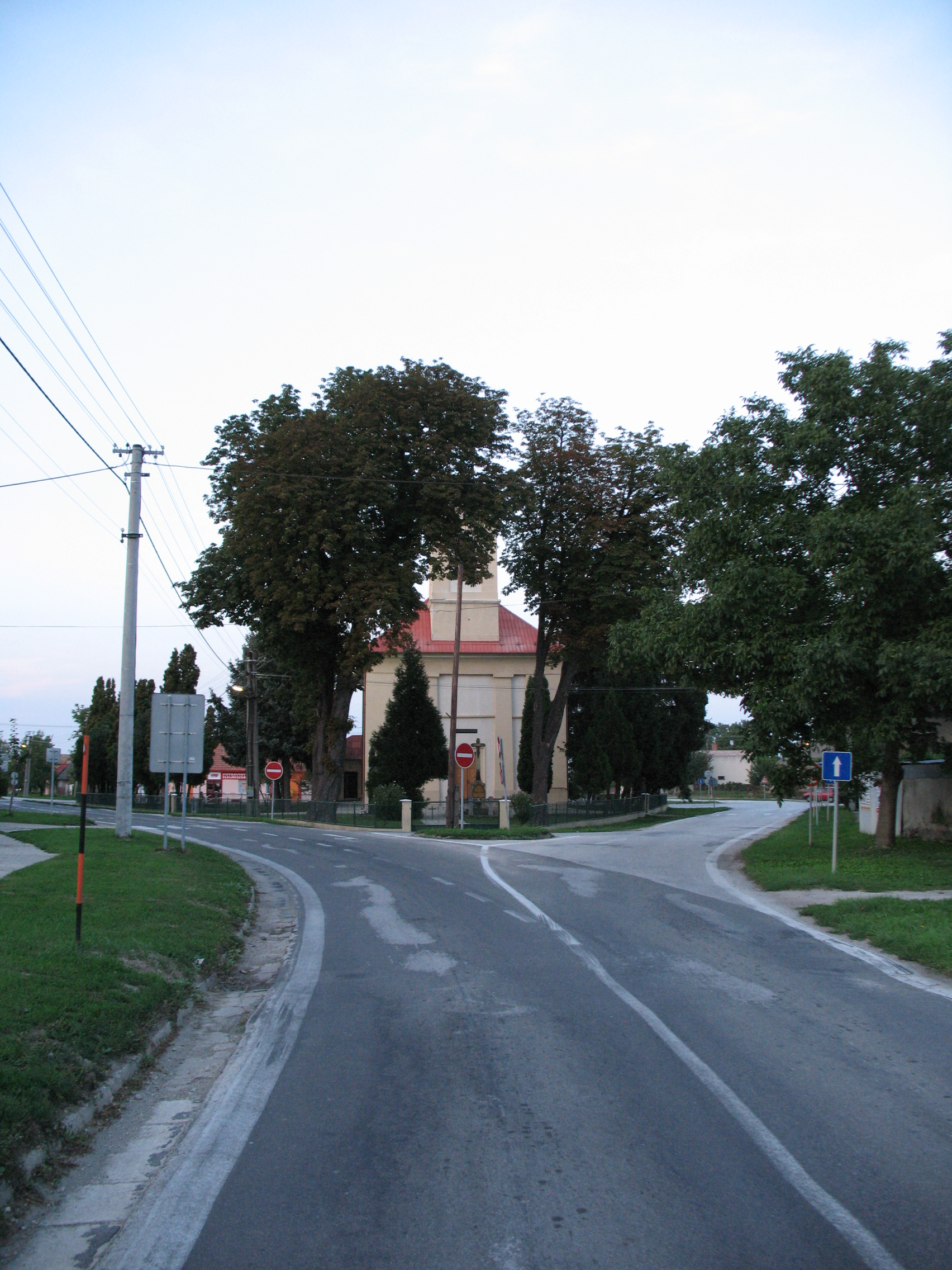

- Flag

- Location of Kráľov Brod in the Trnava Region Location of Kráľov Brod in Slovakia
- Coordinates: 48.06°N 17.83°E
- Country: Slovakia
- Region: Trnava Region
- District: Galanta District
- First mentioned: 1785

Government
  - Mayor: Pál Racsko

Area
  - Total: 23.66 km^{2} (9.14 sq mi)
- Elevation: 112 m (367 ft)

Population (2025)
  - Total: 1,075
- Time zone: UTC+1 (CET)
  - Summer (DST): UTC+2 (CEST)
- Postal code: 925 41
- Area code: +421 31
- Vehicle registration plate (until 2022): GA
- Website: www.kralovbrod.sk

Kráľov Brod (Hungarian: Királyrév) is a village and municipality in Galanta District of the Trnava Region of south-west Slovakia.

== Geography ==
The municipality lies at an altitude of 112 metres (367 ft) and covers an area of 23.66 km^{2} (9.14 sq mi) (2025).

== History ==
In the 9th century, the territory of Kráľov Brod became part of the Kingdom of Hungary. In historical records the village was first mentioned in 1785. Before the establishment of independent Czechoslovakia in 1918, it was part of Pozsony County. After the Austro-Hungarian army disintegrated in November 1918, Czechoslovak troops occupied the area, later acknowledged internationally by the Treaty of Trianon. Between 1938 and 1945 Kráľov Brod once more became part of Miklós Horthy's Hungary through the First Vienna Award. From 1945 until the Velvet Divorce, it was part of Czechoslovakia. Since then it has been part of Slovakia.

== Population ==
Population statistic (10 years)
Year	1995	2005	2015	2025
Count	1165	1165	1106	1075
Difference		+0%	−5.06%	−2.80%

Population statistic
Year	2024	2025
Count	1059	1075
Difference		+1.51%

It has a population of 1075 people (31 December 2025).

=== Ethnicity ===
Census 2021 (1+ %)
Ethnicity	Number	Fraction
Hungarian	841	79.48%
Slovak	249	23.53%
Not found out	36	3.4%
Total	1058	

In year 2021 was 1058 people by ethnicity 841 as Hungarian, 249 as Slovak, 36 as Not found out, 2 as Russian, 2 as Other, 1 as Czech and 1 as Italian.

Note on population: The difference values of population numbers in the table "Population statistic" and in the sections "Ethnicity" & "Religion" is caused by the use of various statistical methods.

=== Religion ===
Census 2021 (1+ %)
Religion	Number	Fraction
Roman Catholic Church	737	69.66%
None	229	21.64%
Evangelical Church	44	4.16%
Not found out	19	1.8%
Calvinist Church	15	1.42%
Total	1058	

In year 2021 was 1058 people by religion 737 from Roman Catholic Church, 229 from None, 44 from Evangelical Church, 19 from Not found out, 15 from Calvinist Church, 6 from Greek Catholic Church, 3 from Christian Congregations in Slovakia, 2 from Other, 1 from Eastern Orthodox Church, 1 from United Methodist Church and 1 from Ad hoc movements.

== Genealogical resources ==
The records for genealogical research are available at the state archive "Statny Archiv in Bratislava, Slovakia"

- Roman Catholic church records (births/marriages/deaths): 1728-1895 (parish A)

== See also ==
- List of municipalities and towns in Slovakia
