= György Klapka =

Hungarian soldier (1820–1892)

General György Klapka
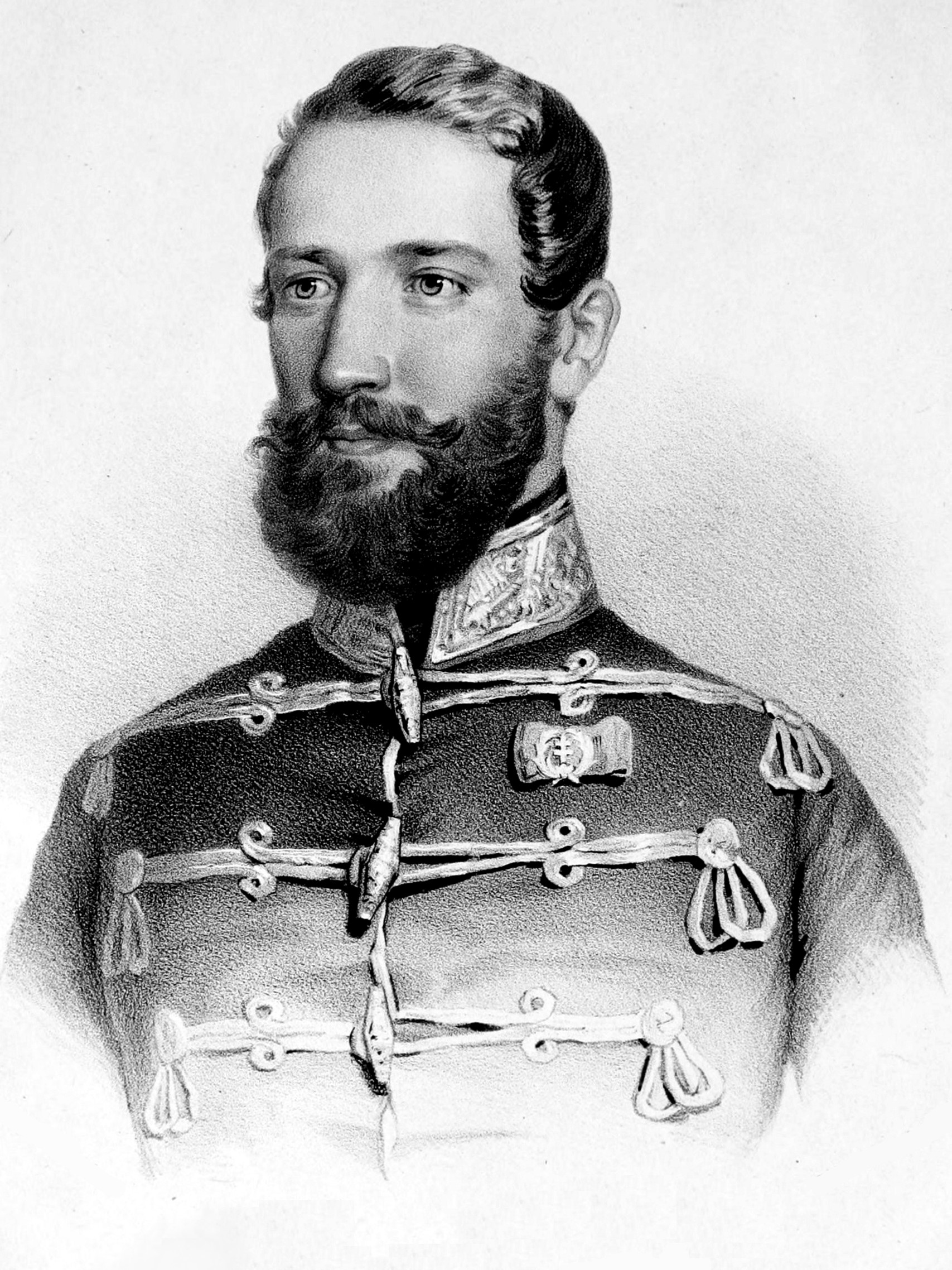

Minister of War of the Hungarian State (Note: Deputy of Artúr Görgei)
- Acting
- In office 7 May 1849 – 21 May 1849
- Prime Minister: Bertalan Szemere
- Preceded by: Lázár Mészáros
- Succeeded by: Artúr Görgei

Chief of Staff of the Hungarian Revolutionary Army
- In office 28 March 1849 – 30 April 1849
- Prime Minister: Lajos Kossuth
- Preceded by: Antal Vetter
- Succeeded by: Maximilian Eugen von Stein

Personal details
- Born: 6 April 1820 Temesvár, Kingdom of Hungary, Austrian Empire (today Timișoara, Romania)
- Died: 17 May 1892 (aged 72) Budapest, Austria-Hungary
- Party: Deák Party

Military service
- Allegiance: Hungarian Revolutionary Army; Prussia
- Years of service: 1838–1849; 1866
- Rank: Major general
- Battles/wars: Hungarian Revolution of 1848; Battle of Tarcal; Battle of Bodrogkeresztúr; Battle of Tokaj; Battle of Hidasnémeti; Battle of Pétervásár; Battle of Kápolna; Battle of Egerfarmos; Battle of Tápióbicske; Battle of Isaszeg; Battle of Nagysalló; First Battle of Komárom; Siege of Buda; Battle of Zsigárd; Battle of Alsónyárasd; Second Battle of Komárom; Third Battle of Komárom; Fourth Battle of Komárom; Battle of Hetény; Austro-Prussian War
- Awards: 2d Class Hungarian Military Decoration

György (Móric) Klapka (German: Georg Klapka; 7 April 1820 – 17 May 1892) was a Hungarian general. He was one of the most important Hungarian generals of the Hungarian War of Independence of 1848–1849, politician, member of the Hungarian Parliament, and deputy War Minister.

== Early life ==
Klapka was born at Temesvár, Kingdom of Hungary on 7 April 1820 in a German-speaking Roman-Catholic family of Moravian origin. His ancestors migrated there from Moravia during the reign of Joseph II (1780–1790) his grandfather founding military pharmacies during the Austro-Turkish War of 1787–1791. In the following decades the families prestige grew, and György Klapka's father, József Klapka, was mayor of Temesvár for nearly 15 years, as well as elected twice as deputy in the Hungarian Diet, and later ennobled by the king. His mother was Júlia Kehrer.

He had five brothers and sisters. He lost his mother at an early age. As a child, he recalls, I had the greatest pleasure of watching military ceremonies, where I admired the uniforms of the Hungarian generals, as well as spending much time on the ramparts of the fortress of Temesvár. Despite his Moravian origin Klapka considered himself a Hungarian. His early education was at Roman Catholic secondary schools in Kecskemét and Szeged. His mother tongue was German, he learned Latin in the school, then Hungarian in Kecskemét. His parents wanted him to become a priest, but he was attracted to a career as a military officer. After graduating from military school in Karánsebes, he joined the Imperial-Royal Army in 1837.

No sooner had I put on the uniform than the oath I was to take was read out in front of me. As soon as I said the words, my bosom tightened, for I felt that from now on I was no longer a free man, but a slave: that I was no longer ruled by my own will, but by the will of others. But these shackles were of my free will, and such shackles must be worn, and so I endured them with patience. Very soon I got used to the strict iron discipline of my position, saw the necessity of it, and adapted to it he wrote in his memoirs about the beginning of his military career. He served as a cadet in the 2nd Artillery Regiment in Vienna, then in the Bombardier Corps.

In the spring of 1842, after the confirmation of his family's nobility, he was commissioned, at the proposal of Sebő Vukovics, to the Hungarian Nobiliary Royal Bodyguards (Magyar királyi nemesi testőrség), as a delegate of the Temes County, continuing his career in the Guards of Vienna, where he became friends with Artúr Görgei. He was transferred from Vienna to Pancsova, to the 12th Border Guard Infantry Regiment of the German-Banat border guards, until his retirement from the army in 1847 with the rank of artillery Lieutenant. Here he was sent as lieutenant to the Border Region Division, but soon he disarmed. In 1847 he thought of travelling to Lahore in northern India (now Pakistan), to join the army of one of the Indian princes, but on hearing the news of the revolution from Paris from February 1848 he decided to remain in Hungary.

== His military career in the Hungarian War of Independence ==
=== Before becoming a general ===
After the victory, on 15 March, of the Hungarian Revolution of 1848, Klapka volunteered in the Hungarian army, where he was made captain. In May 1848 he was sent by the Batthyány Government along with two Hungarian officers to Kolozsvár and the Székely Land to learn if public sentiment in Transylvania was in favour of reunification with Hungary, and to assess how many of the Székely border guard units could be sent to Hungary. On 13 June he was appointed as a captain to the 16 Hungarian Battalion in Veszprém and in August joined the Hungarian military operations in Bácska in southern Hungary against the Serbian insurgents.

On 25 September he was sent to be the temporary director of the Komárom fortress, known as the Gibraltar of the Danube. During that time he prevented Wilhelm Mertz, the constable of the fortress, from delivering it in the hands of the Habsburgs, and played a role in forcing Mertz and the officers loyal to the Habsburgs, to leave Komárom, securing this very important stronghold for Hungary. From 16 October Klapka also supervised the fortification works in Pozsony. As the commander of the concentrated Hungarian national guards concentrated at Nagyszombat, he participated in military operations against the Austrian troops led by Balthasar von Simunich, which broke into Hungary from Moravia.

On 13 November he was appointed chief of general staff of the Bánság army corps, and together with General Antal Vetter, he produced a plan to crush the Serbian insurgency, but this failed owing to weak execution by the main commander of the military operations, General Ernő Kiss. By the end of December 1848 he was attached to the general staff section of the Hungarian Ministry of Defence.

That month Austrian imperial troops led by Field Marshal Alfred I, Prince of Windisch-Grätz attacked Hungary, and Klapka was appointed major in the Hungarian army, and by 9 January 1849 colonel. Together with Vetter he planned the retreat of the Hungarian troops along the Tisza river, and became commander of the Upper Tisza Corps (Felső-tiszai hadtest).

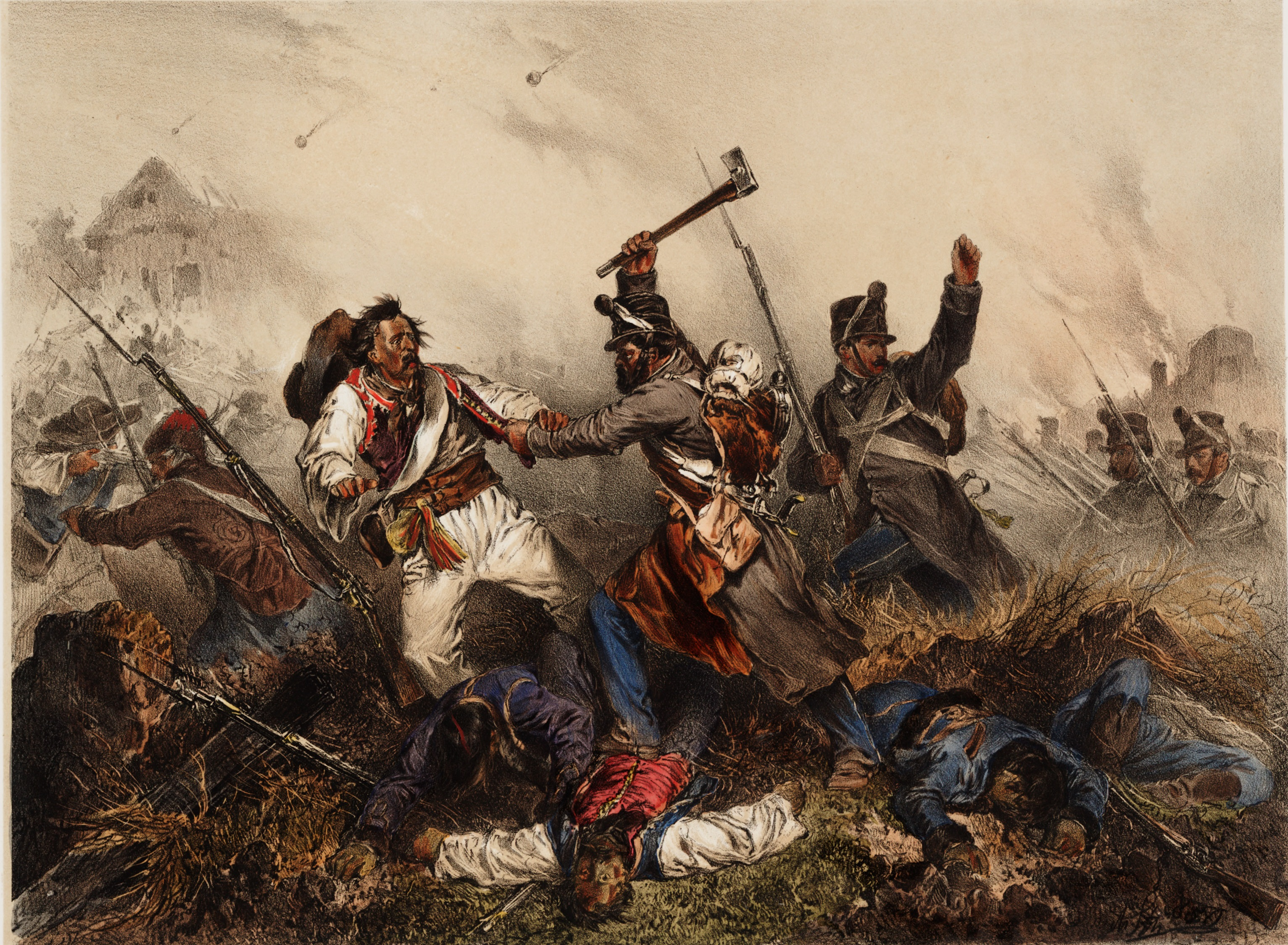
Scene from the Battle of Bodrogkeresztúr 23 January 1849

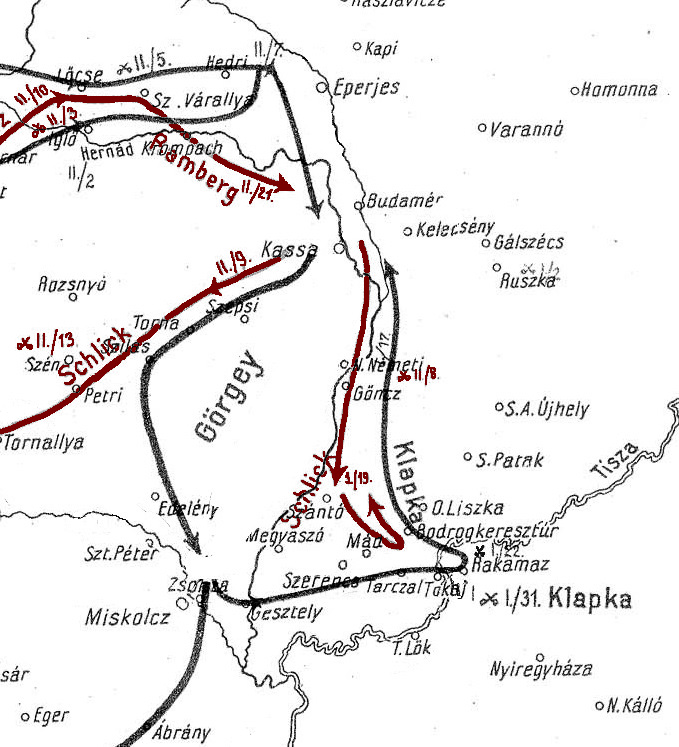
This map shows the successful defensive actions of Klapa in stopping Schlik's crossing of the Tisza river.

Before this the Upper Tisza Corps was led by the Minister of War General Lázár Mészáros, who was defeated by the Austrian troops led by Lieutenant-General Franz Schlik in the Battle of Kassa. Klapka took over these beaten troops in January 1849, reorganized them, and beat Schlik in three consecutive battles at Tarcal (20 January), Bodrogkeresztúr (23 January), and Tokaj (31 January). Thanks to these victories Klapka held the Hungarian defensive line along the Tisza river, and won precious time for the Hungarian commandment to organize the counter-attack against Windisch-Grätz imperial troops. From 29 January 1849 he was under the command of Lieutenant-General Henryk Dembiński the main commander of the Hungarian armies. After their victory at 5 February 1849 in the Battle of Branyiszkó, the Upper Danube Corps led by Artúr Görgei approached to the Tisza river from the northwest, menacing, together with Klapka's corps, to encircle and destroy Schlik's army. Understanding the importance of this chance, Klapka tried to convince Dembiński to attack Schlik's corps from the south, but the latter refused, ordering Klapka to retreat. This wrong decision of the main commander enabled Schlik to escape the danger, and to retreat. Klapka defeated him again on 8 February at Hidasnémeti, but the Austrian general was able to retreat towards the west, joining the main imperial troops led by Windisch-Grätz.

Klapka participated during 26–27 February in the Battle of Kápolna, commanding the right wing of the Hungarian army at Verpelét. The battle was lost because of Dembiński's poor army leading and indecision. After Dembiński's order of retreat, at 1 March Klapka fought successful rearguard actions against the Austrian corps led by Ladislaus von Wrbna at Egerfarmos.

At 3 March he was one of the leaders of the revolt at Tiszafüred of the Hungarian officers dissatisfied with Dembiński's leadership, and forced him to resign, supporting Görgei's election to the main command.

For his victories against Schlik he received on 13 March the 3d Class Hungarian Military Decoration.

=== General and deputy War Minister ===
At 28 March, only 29, he received the rank of General.

Klapka elaborated the plan of the Spring Campaign of the Hungarian army, which in the end of May, after a series of victories, brought the liberation of almost all Hungary from the Austrian armies. The plan's main purpose was to distract the attention of the Austrian commanders with the attack from the north of the VII Corps, while the other three corps (I, II, III) had to march undetected from the south and to attack from the flank the main Austrian troops stationed at Gödöllő.

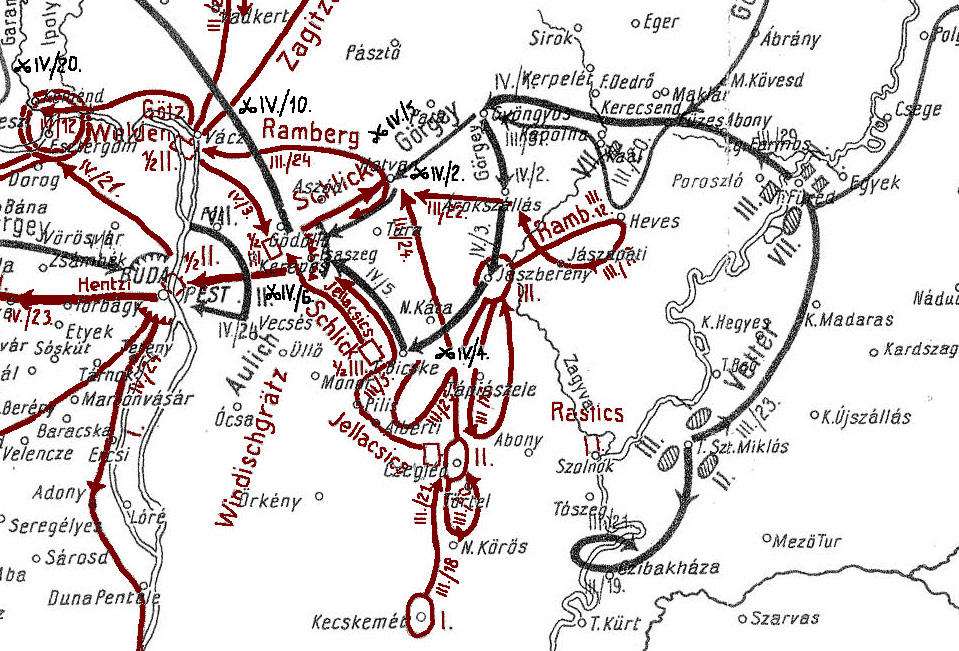
The map of the first phase of the Spring Campaign, its plan being elaborated by György Klapka

But Klapka was the one who, unwillingly revealed the plan to the enemy, which could cause a catastrophe for the Hungarian army. Initially, the victory of the Hungarian VII Corps led by András Gáspár against Schlik in the Battle of Hatvan at 2 April, deceived Windisch-Grätz to think that the attack of the Hungarian forces would come from that direction but the failed attack of Klapka's I corps against the Austrian I Corps led by Josip Jelačić in the first phase of the Battle of Tápióbicske (he sent his troops in the city without scouting before that, to see if any enemy troops were in there, thus his troops were ambushed by enemy infantry and a cavalry brigade), forced the III corps led by János Damjanich to intervene, and to turn the tide of the battle – which could have become a serious defeat for the Hungarians – into a victory, made the Austrian Field-Marshal suspicious, that the main Hungarian attack could come from other directions, and not from where he expected that.

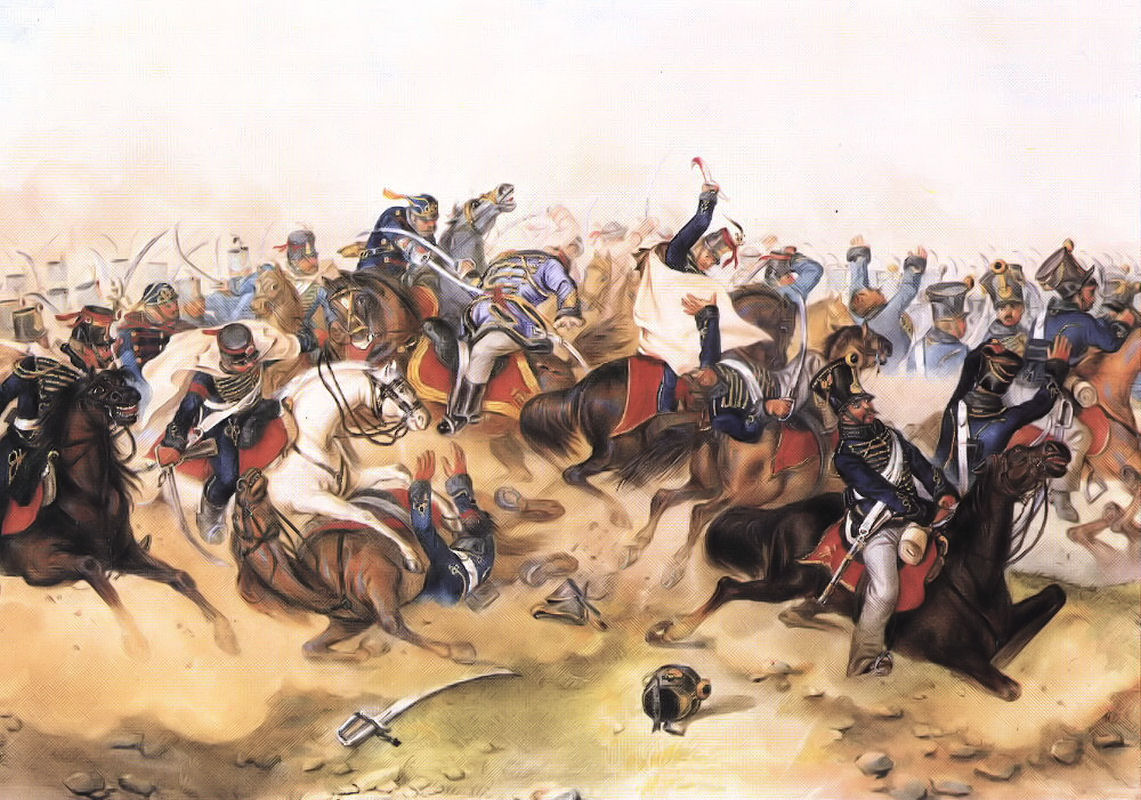
Mór Than: Cavalry fight in the battle of Tápióbicske

However Jelačić's vain report to Windisch-Grätz that his troops won the battle of Tápióbicske, deceived him, to think that the Croatian general was attacked only by minor Hungarian forces, so he still was not sure from where to expect the enemy's attack. Furthermore, Windisch-Grätz was informed about the attack of a Hungarian detachment, on 24 March against Losonc, which took prisoner half of the 500-600 strong Austrian detachment, making him to think that important Hungarian troops will attack also from the northeast. But Klapka's attack made Windisch-Grätz aware of a danger coming from the south, which may be considered his error.

In the Battle of Isaszeg from 6 April, the first decisive battle of the Spring Campaign, after initial successes, Klapka's I Corps were pushed back by Jelačić's superior forces, which made Klapka waver, and to think seriously to retreat from the battlefield, letting Damjanich's III Corps alone, but the arrival of Görgei, and his order to resist at all costs, then the arrival of the II Corps led by Lajos Aulich, convinced him to remain and fight. At the end of the battle Klapka's I corps charge chased the enemy from Isaszeg and brought the victory for the Hungarians. The fluctuating behavior of Klapka during the battle showed that despite being a good strategist, creating good operation plans, which, in the Spring Campaign, enabled him to defeat the superior imperial troops (55,000 Austrians against 47,500 Hungarians), he could be hesitating in their execution. During the battle of Isaszeg Damjanich criticized Klapka of being too timorous and sensible to the complaints of his soldiers, instead of being resolute and determined. Luckily the main commander of Army of the Upper Danube (Feldunai Hadsereg) was Görgei, who was the most able Hungarian general to carry out Klapka's plans, led the army in the best way, being able to take quickly the correct decisions after short thinking, being very determined in his decisions, showing no hesitation even before the most unexpected situations, and thanks to this the Hungarian army emerged victorious in the Spring Campaign.

The second phase of the campaign was elaborated not by Klapka but by the chief of the general staff, József Bayer. The second phase of the Spring Campaign started not very well Klapka, whose soldiers were sent to encircle the enemy in the First Battle of Vác, got lost in the rainy-foggy weather in the morning of 10 April, and did not arrive on the battlefield, but luckily Damjanich again was able to resolve the problem, and defeat the enemy alone. But in the other battles of this phase of the Spring campaign Klapka distinguished himself. In the Battle of Nagysalló (19 April), he played a leading role in that victory, in the same way as in the relief of Komárom (26 April).

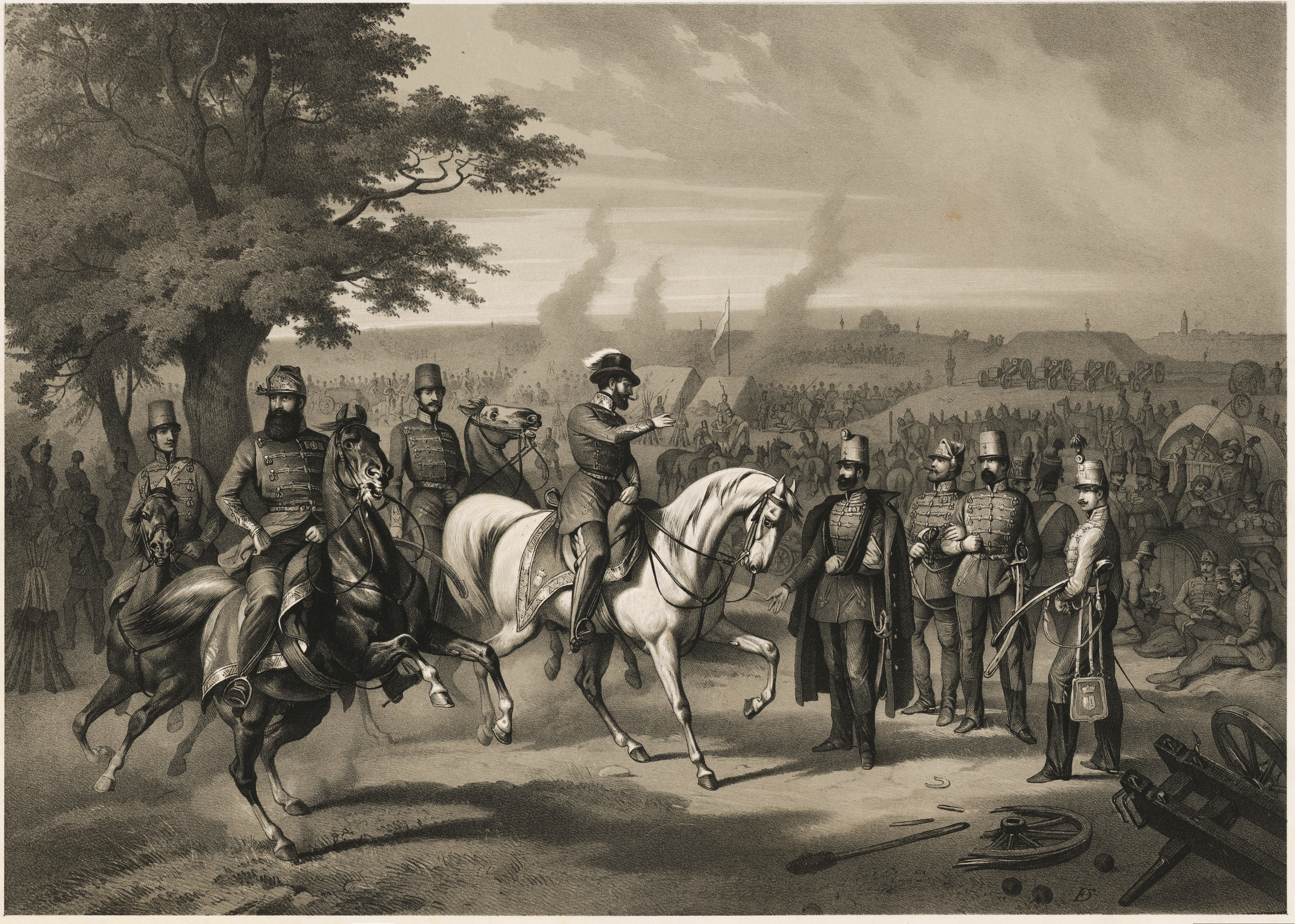
Szeremley Miklósː Hungarian camp at Komárom after 20 April 1849. In the middle on a white horse is György Klapka, at left on a black horse is János Damjanich

In the middle of April he received the 2nd Class Hungarian Military Decoration.

At 30 April 1849 he was named deputy War Minister substituting Görgei, who was leading the Siege of Buda (04-21 May 1849). Quite in the first day in his office in Debrecen Klapka had a conflict with Sándor Petőfi, the Hungarian national poet, then a major in the Army of Transylvania under the command of Lieutenant General Józef Bem. The cause of the conflict was the article written by Petőfi in the newspaper Honvéd, in which he published a letter of Bem against general Károly Vécsey, accusing the latter of high treason, cowardice and incapacity, because he did not help Bem in his failed attempt to capture the fortress of Temesvár. Hearing about this Klapka and other Hungarian generals, who were on Vécsey's side, accused Petőfi of being undisciplined, dressing not accordingly to a soldier, besmirching the Hungarian army to the public, thus weakening the will of the nation to fight against the enemy.

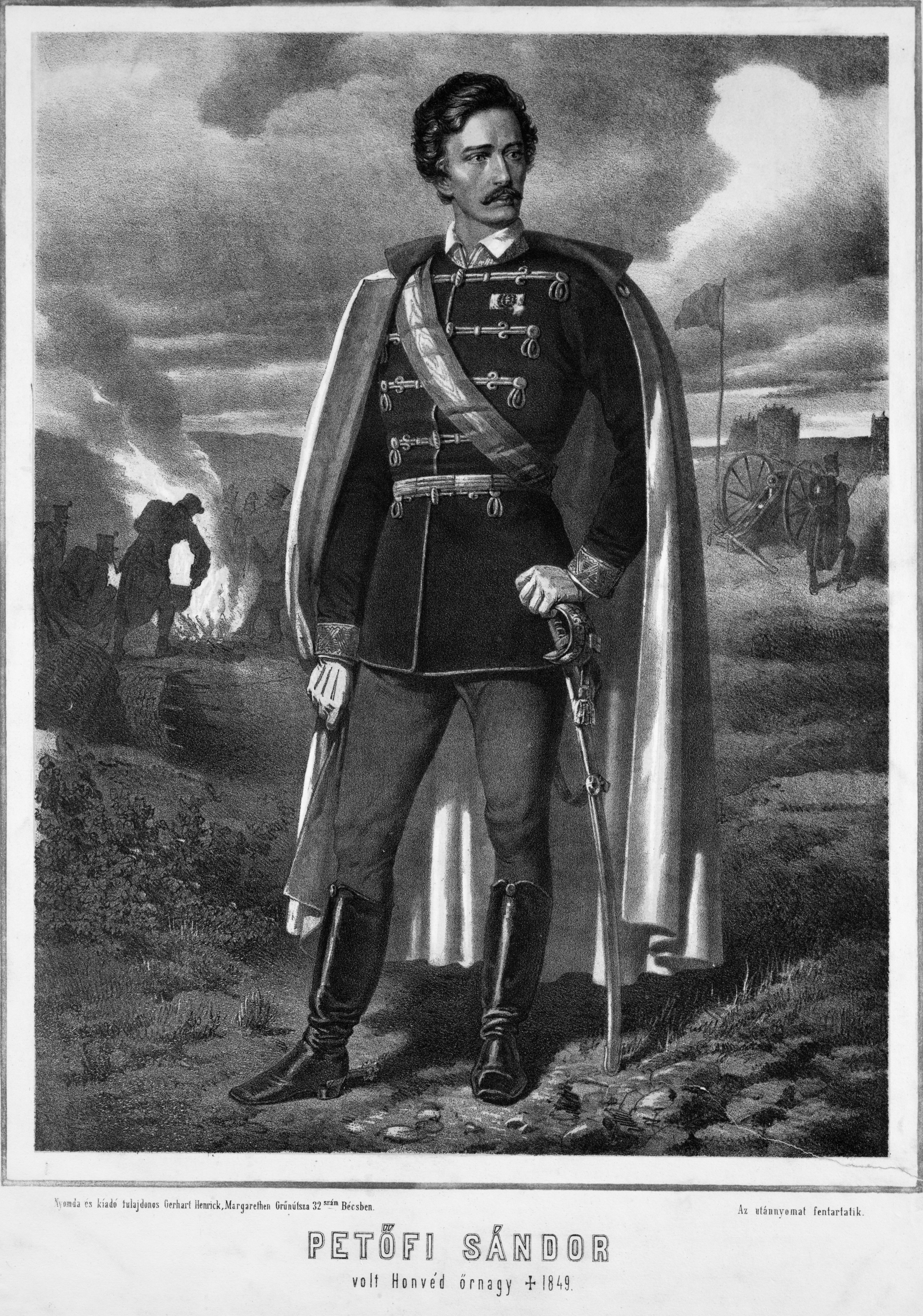
Sándor Petőfi as a Major in 1849

Klapka was angered on Petőfi also because of the poet's former conflicts with other Hungarian officers and war ministers like Lieutenant General Antal Vetter and Lieutenant General Lázár Mészáros (against whom he wrote also a satirical poem), so he reprimanded the poet, who came to the war office seeking permission to go to the freshly liberated Pest, to bury his father. At the end of the quarrel, seeing that Klapka would not allow him to go, Petőfi promptly resigned his military title and quit the army. After this, thinking himself free from military discipline, Petőfi wrote a letter to Klapka, declaring that he cannot bear offenses from Klapka, which offended his dignity, and wrote a poem entitled Egy goromba tábornokra (About a Rude General), in which he named Klapka an unworthy man and a weak general. Klapka prosecuted Petőfi for this, and when he met him on 14 May at Pest, he arrested the poet. Petőfi was saved by General Görgei, whose favorite poet he was, liberating him from the arrest, sending a deputation made of officers to ask for pardon from Klapka in the name of Petőfi.

In the middle of May 1849, the news about the upcoming Russian intervention spread throughout Hungary, and the need to take measures against this grave danger became imminent. The enemy had a huge numerical advantage against the Hungarian army: the attacking Russian and Austrian armies had 358 000 soldiers (plus another 75 000 soldiers in Galicia and Walachia in reserve) and 770 cannons against 150 000 Hungarian soldiers with 440 cannons.

In the second part of May, Klapka was designated to elaborate the united operation plan of all the armies from Hungary. According to this operation plan the main army under Görgei had to defend the western border, while the army of Transylvania under Józef Bem had to defend mountain passes in the Eastern Carpathians, but in the same time he had to crush also the Romanian revolt from the Western Carpathians, to take the fortresses of Gyulafehérvár and Déva, then to attack towards the west, taking the Titel Plateau, liberating Pétervárad, then advancing to the Adriatic Sea, or to the western front. Although it was accepted by the Ministry Council on 20 May, this operation plan was met with harsh criticism from Görgei and Bem, who accused it of no concern for the imminent Russian intervention which menaced from the north and from the east, and that Lieutenant General Bem and General Mór Perczel had been designated to carry out military actions which exceeded their capacities, while the other Hungarian corps were condemned to almost complete inactivity. Bem declared that he would not carry out the military actions entailed on him by the operation's plan, and would remain in Transylvania to defend it from the imminent Russian attack, while Görgei said that the only correct thing to do was to immediately attack with all forces on the western front towards Vienna, to crush the Austrian army before the Russians could intervene. As a result of these reactions and the start of the Russian intervention on 15 June 1849, Klapka's operation plan was not carried out.

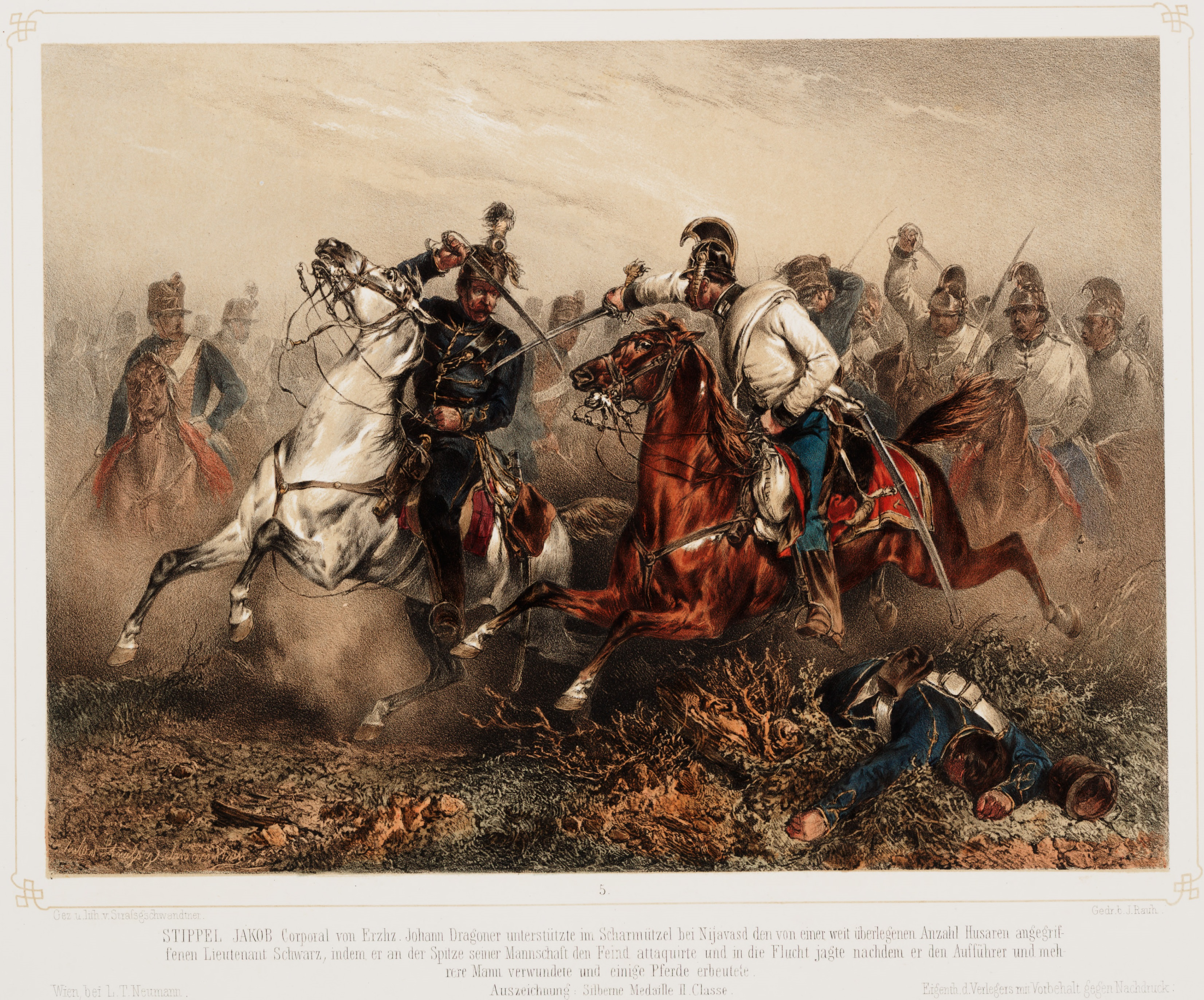
Cavalry skirmish around Alsónyárasd during the battle of Pered at 20 June 1849

In June, when Görgei took over his duties in the War Ministry, Klapka substituted him in the command of the Army of the Upper Danube, being entrusted, together with the chief of the general staff Colonel József Bayer, to attack the imperial forces led by Field-Marshal Julius Jacob von Haynau in the region of the Vág river, and push them towards Pozsony and Vienna, but on 16 June they were defeated by the Austrians in the Battle of Zsigárd. Among the causes of the defeat was that Klapka did not tolerate that the head of the Central Operations Bureau, Colonel József Bayer, should have the authority over him. Their disagreements and contradictory orders affected the Hungarian troops' already weak chances of success during the Battles of Zsigárd, Ihász and Győr. When Görgei took over the main command, in the Battle of Pered from 20 to 21 June 1849, Klapka had the mission to attack with the VIII corps the Austrians in the Csallóköz, but his troops were forced to retreat in the first day of the Battle of Alsónyárasd. Nevertheless, at the end of the battle Klapka's troops secured the retreat of the Hungarian army, by securing the bridge from Aszódpuszta.

During the Second Battle of Komárom of 2 July, Klapka commanded the left wing of the Hungarian army, retreating initially from Ószőny, but at the end of the battle, after fierce fighting, recaptured the important locality from the Austrian IV corps led by General Ludwig von Benedek. At the end of this battle Görgei was heavily wounded, and once again, Klapka took over the command from him, until he was again able to lead the army. During this period under the lead of Klapka, the Hungarian officers decided to oppose the decisions of the Hungarian government, which demanded the immediate retreat of the army from Komárom, and the deposition of Görgei from the commandment of the Army of the Upper Danube. Klapka and the officers refused to fulfill both these orders, forcing the government to accept their decision to remain for several days in Komárom, and to keep Görgei as their commander. On 7 July, on the order from Kossuth, Klapka sent the I. corps led by General Nagysándor towards Szeged, but when Görgei took notice of this, he resigned from the leadership of the Army of the Upper Danube, to protest this decision taken without his knowledge. Hearing about this Klapka ordered the I. corps to return to Komárom, as a result of which Görgei retracted his decision, remaining the commander of the army.

On 11 July, because Görgei was still unable to lead the army, Klapka commanded the Hungarian forces in the Third Battle of Komárom. He had to carry out Kossuth's plan, supported also by Görgei, to break the Austrian blockade on Komárom, then retreat with three corps towards southern Hungary, where Kossuth intended to concentrate the Hungarian troops. The Hungarians tried to break the Austrian blockade from the west against Komárom, but, because of the inactivity of two of the corps commanders, the battle was lost. Klapka led this battle without much determination because he did not understand the reason for attacking the Austrian army, when after the battle, no matter what its outcome would be, the bulk of the Hungarian army had to retreat towards Szeged. In this battle, Klapka's main goal was to avoid the loss of too many Hungarian soldiers.

=== Klapka's heroic "last man standing" as the defender of Komárom ===
On 12–13 July, when, under Görgei's command, the Army of the Upper Danube retreated from Komárom to the east, Klapka remained with the II and VIII corps (around 18,300 soldiers) in Komárom, having the duty to defend with at all costs the fortress and to "bind" as many enemy troops around it, preventing them to participate in the campaign against the Hungarian armies.

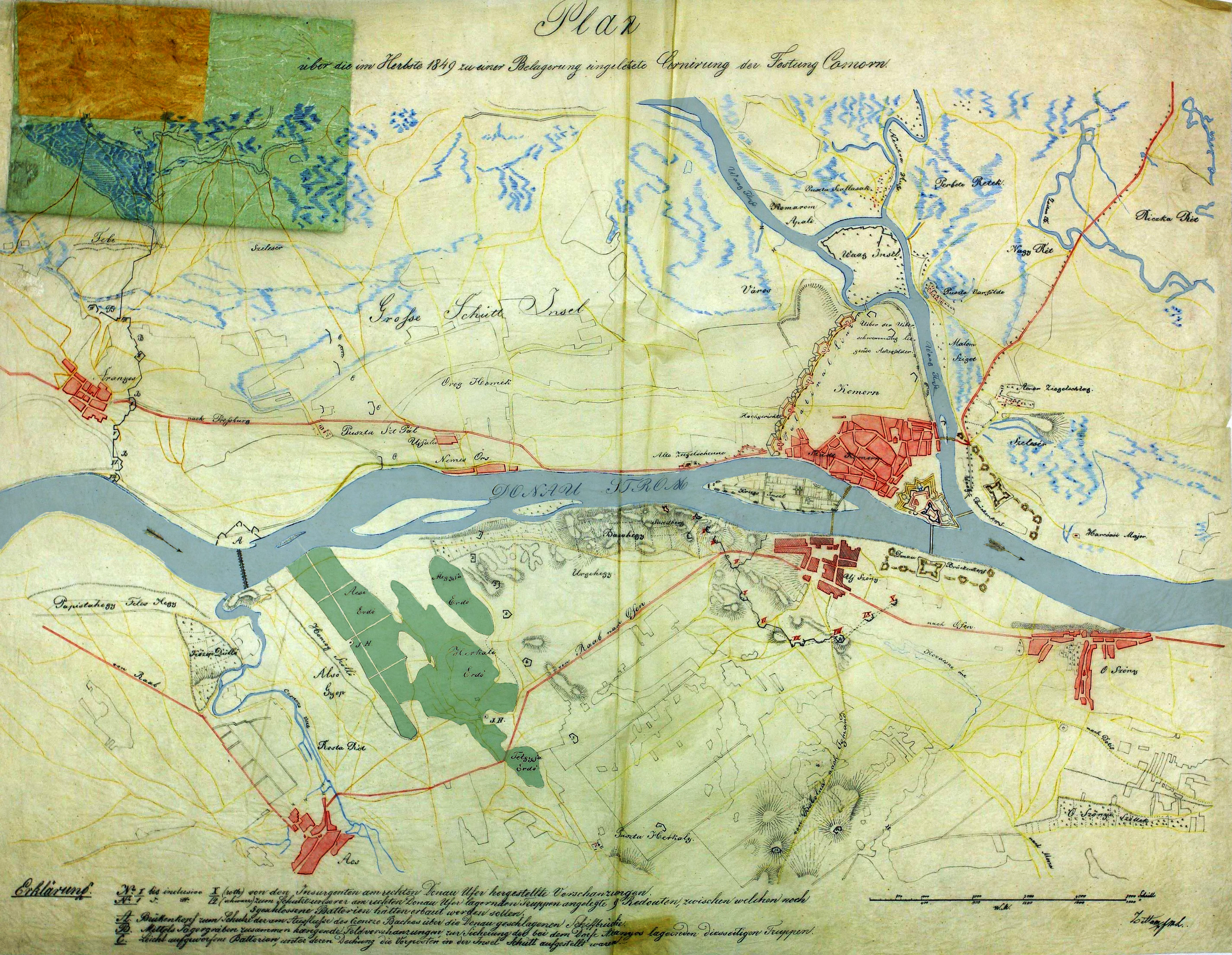
The map of the fortress of Komárom in 1849

As the captain of the encircled fortress, cut off from the other Hungarian armies, Klapka decided to make a heroic stand against the superior enemy, to resist until nothing more could be done, and if he would be forced to leave Komárom, he would do it only with honour. He wrote this in July:

"I say it already from now: no matter what will be the situation, we can leave this place only with honor, or we will be buried together under the crumbling ruins of this [fortress]. Long live the Fatherland, and its heroic army!"

Until 23 July this task was fulfilled with success, forcing 28,000 imperial soldiers to secure the fortress, but then half of these troops were sent to Pest. On 25 July a Hungarian raiding unit captured a stagecoach in which they found documents containing the list of the imperial troops around Komárom, from which Klapka understood that his troops in the fortress were more numerous than the besiegers, and as the imperial troops were divided, being on both banks of the Danube, which prevented them from helping each other when attacked, he had the opportunity to defeat the enemy in detail.

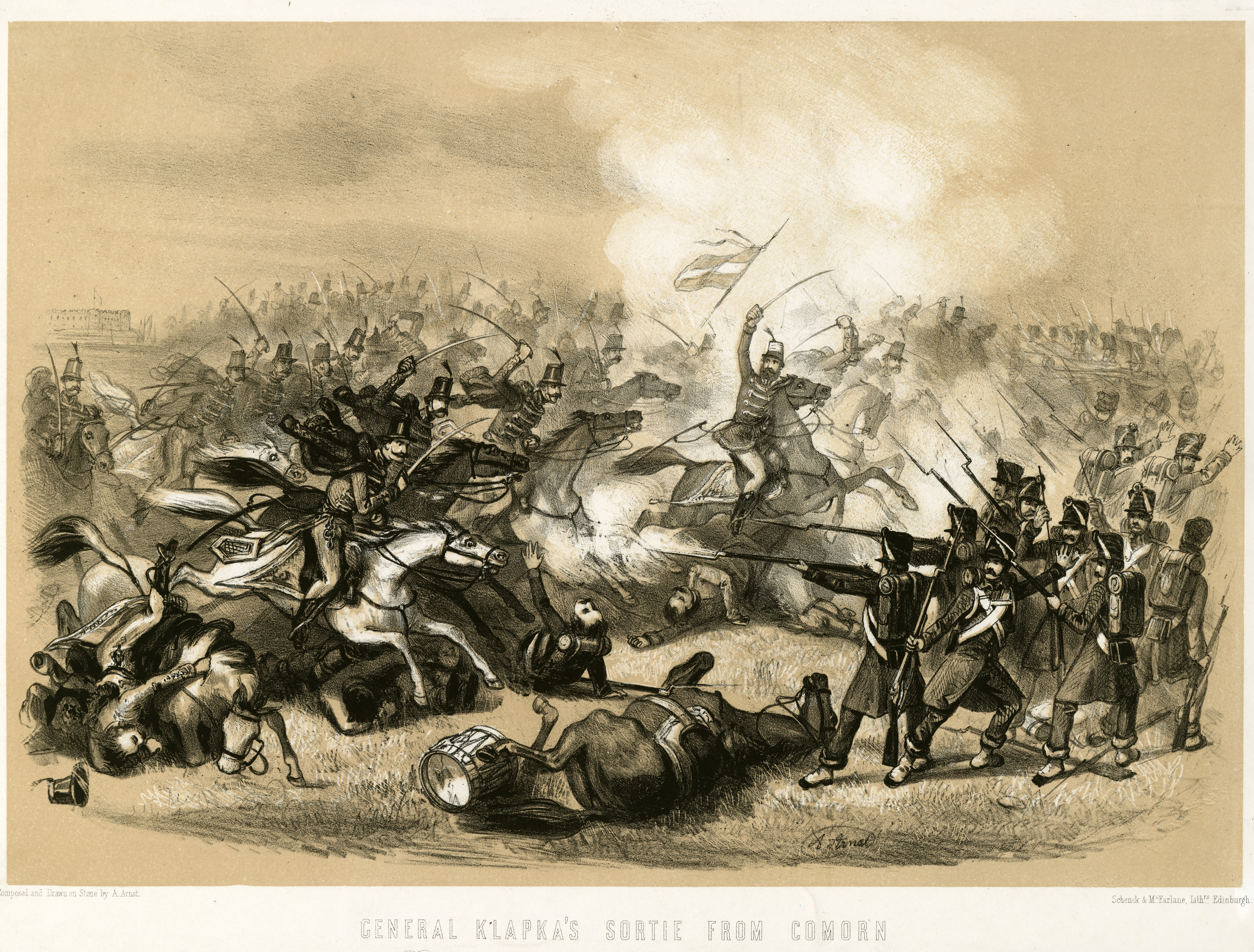
A. Arnst: György Klapka leading the Hussars charge in the Fourth Battle of Komárom at 3 August 1849

In the night of 29–30 June Klapka sent troops on the left bank of the Danube, chasing away the Austrian troops from the northwest of Komárom. In the night of 3 August 1849, Klapka personally led the Hungarian troops to the right bank of the Danube, attacking the Austrian blockade around the fortress, crushing the imperial forces led by Lieutenant Field Marshal Anton Csorich in the Fourth Battle of Komárom, causing them 1,500 casualties, capturing 30 cannons, many thousands of rifles, ammunition and an entire herd of oxen. This was the last important battle won by the Hungarians in the Hungarian War of Independence. After the battle Klapka's troops advanced to the west and occupied the city of Győr, liberating a huge territory from north Transdanubia, cutting the connection and supply lines between Vienna and the troops led by Haynau in central Hungary. Hearing the news of this victory the citizens of Székesfehérvár revolted against the occupying Austrian forces and chased them away. Klapka started recruitment from the liberated territories, which added 5,000-6,000 new recruits to his troops, and planned to attack the Austrian province of Styria.

However on 11 August he received news of the disastrous situation on the other fronts, and halted his operations. He understood that his victory came a little too late to change the fate of the Hungarian war of independence. Two days after this, at 13 August 1849, 10 days after Klapka's victory, the main Hungarian army led by Artúr Görgei surrendered in front of the Russian troops at the Szöllős Meadow near the village of Világos.

Klapka, together with his 25,000 soldiers, retreated on 15 August to Komárom. On 19 August the Austrian and Russian troops arrived to the fortress and began to encircle it; on 14 September the number of Austrians reached 44,000 soldiers and 154 cannons, and the Russians numbered 12,000 soldiers and 56 cannons. The Austrians then the Russians too demanded the surrender of the fortress but Klapka and the Hungarian military council refused. Thanks to the intervention in the negotiations of the Habsburg Minister of Defense Ferenc Gyulay, himself a Hungarian, on 21 August a 14-day armistice was signed, which allowed Klapka to send four commissioners to travel across all Hungary to ascertain about the military situation in the country, and to be sure that the Hungarian army had lost the Independence War.

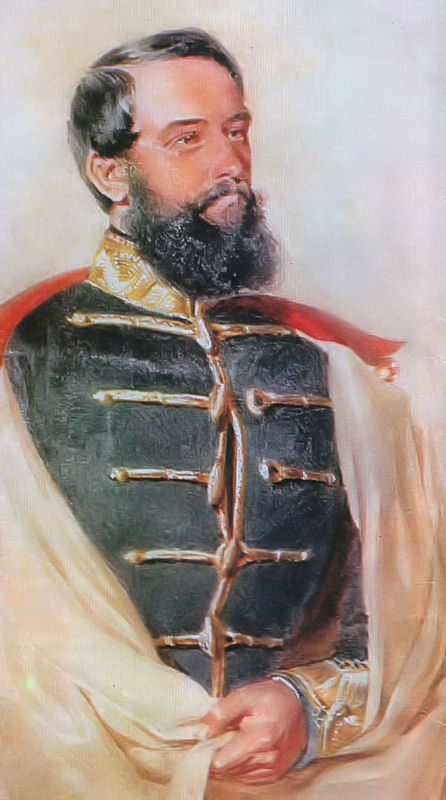
György Klapka by Károly Sterio

After the commissioners turned back with the news of the surrender of the Hungarian armies and the majority of the fortresses, instead of deciding to surrender as well, like the Austrians and the Russians hoped, the defenders of Komárom became more combative and wanted even more than before, to continue their fight. Klapka ordered new battalions and one division to be formed, and the trenches around the fortress to be strengthened. He even founded a personal guards unit made up of grenadiers.

During the Austro-Russian siege the Hungarian composer Béni Egressy who was in the besieged Komárom, wrote the Klapka March, in honor of the general. This military march is played often today during military parades in Hungary. The march's lyrics, entitled Fel, fel vitézek a csatára (Rise, Rise Soldiers to the Battle) were written much later, in 1861, by Kálmán Thaly.

At the end of August all of the mobile Hungarian troops surrendered, as well as the fortresses, with the exception of Pétervárad, which held until 7 September. Only the fortress of Komárom refused to surrender. On 5, 7, 10, 25 and 27 September the Hungarian defenders fought with success against the enemy troops, furthermore the Hungarian Hussars executed successful sorties against the besieging army. For example, on 5 September 300 hussars, led personally by Klapka, routed a Russian Cossack unit in the Battle of Hetény.

Seeing that they had no success in their attempts to take the fortress by force, the Austrians tried distraction, attempting to diminish the morale, fighting spirit and the unity of the defenders. They sent in the fortress different leaflets, fake reports, orders, which tried to persuade the defenders to treachery, to revolt, to refuse to fulfil orders, or to desert, promising them amnesty in exchange. This method had a certain success, because the number of the desertions increased, and Klapka was forced to take more drastic measures against them. As a result, 15 Hungarian deserters were executed publicly in the main square of Komárom.

The Austrians even paid a hitman to assassinate Klapka, named Fehérhegyi, allegedly he was born in New York state. He was caught before he could assassinate Klapka. Found on him was a letter of credence from the Austrian officer Lieutenant-Colonel Hoyos, which demonstrated that he worked for the Austrians. Fehérhegyi was sentenced to death by court martial and executed.

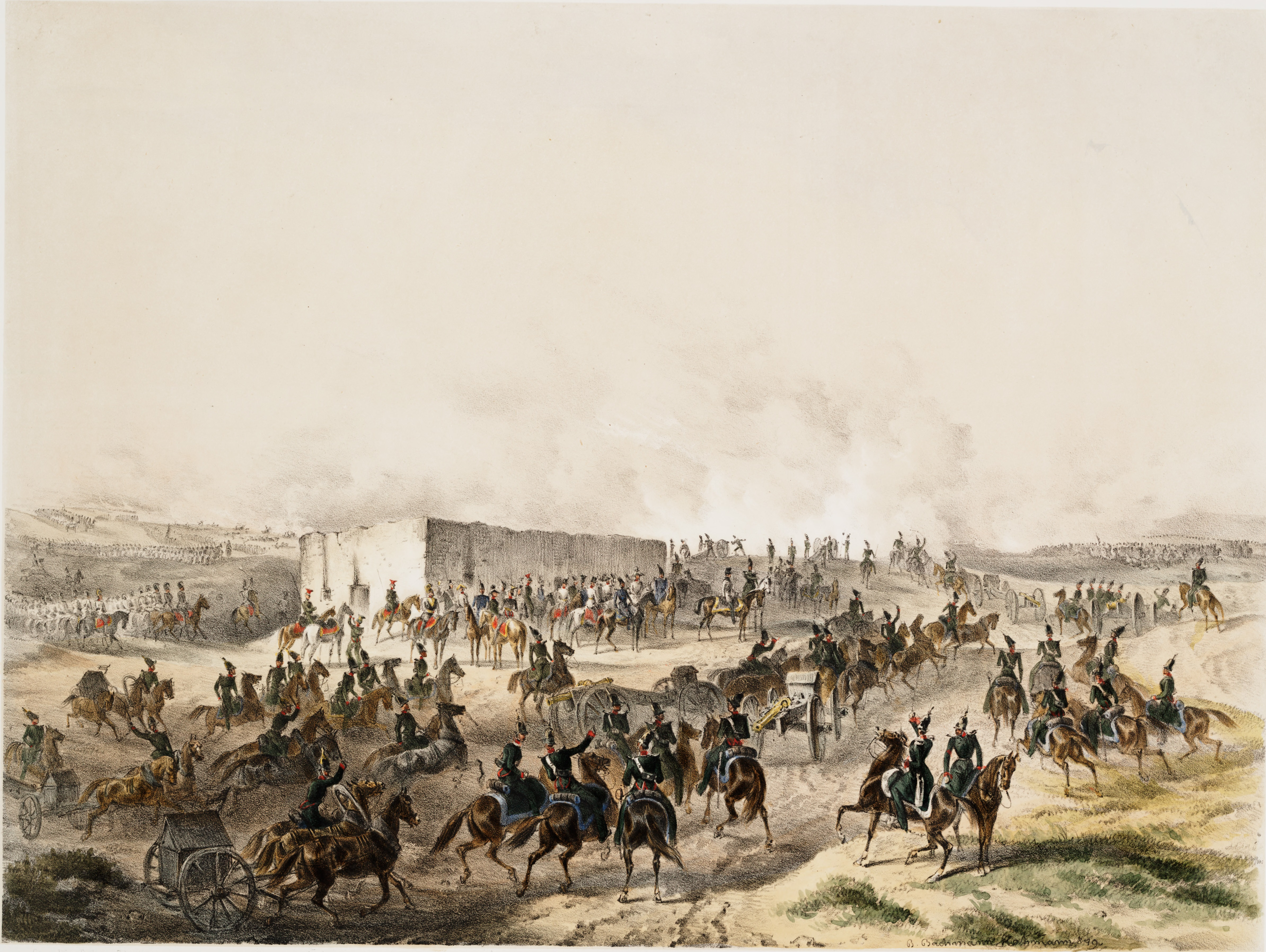
The siege of Komárom in August–September 1849 by the Austrian and Russian troops

The Austrians continued to send demands to surrender, and on 19 September the Hungarian military council of Komárom decided to resume the talks with the Austrians. Some of the officers were against this and conjured against Klapka, but they were caught and put to jail. Klapka sent a demand to the besiegers demanding the Austrians to give total amnesty for all people from Hungary, who participated in the revolution and in the War of Independence, and to liberate the war prisoners. Probably Klapka knew that these conditions could not be accepted, but he wanted to win time, hoping for a new Hungarian uprising or a foreign help. He also hoped that with these exaggerated demands he would be able to obtain at least amnesty for the defenders of Komárom. This was rejected, Lieutenant Field Marshal Anton Csorich demanding unconditional surrender, so the Hungarians decided to continue the resistance. On 26 September the main commander of the Austrian forces Julius Jacob von Haynau arrived to Komárom, took over the leadership of the besieging forces and ordered general attack against the fortress, but it was easily repulsed by the Hungarian artillery and a Hussar squadron. This was the last military engagement of the Hungarian War of Independence of 1848–1849.

Haynau understood that taking Komárom would be a very hard and long task that would cause thousands of deaths among his troops, so he decided to seek a compromise with Klapka and the defenders.

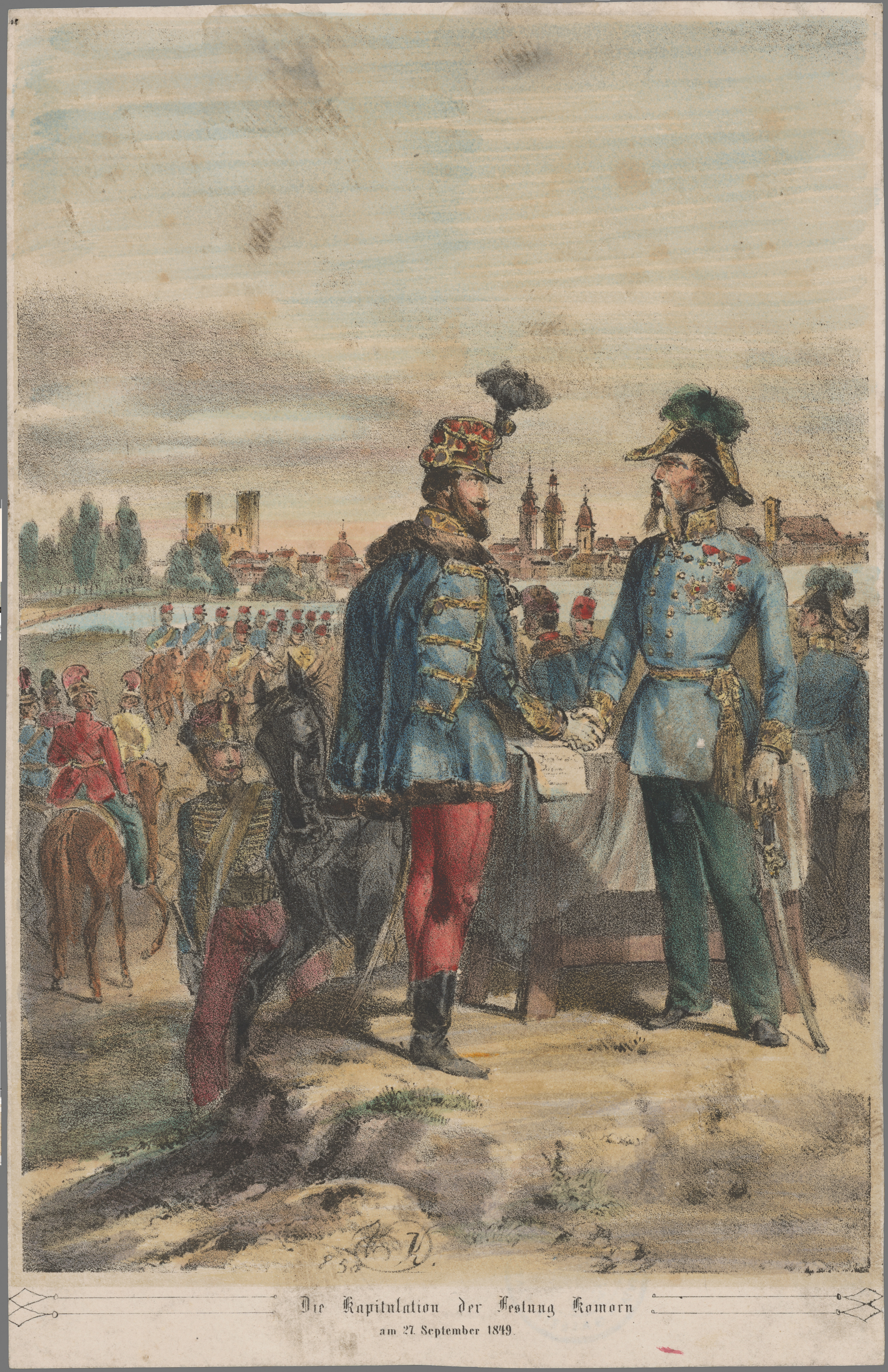
Vinzenz Katzler: General György Klapka surrendering the fortress of Komárom to Field Marshall Jacob Julius von Haynau on 2 October 1849

Finally on 27 September 1849 the delegation of the defenders agreed with Field Marshal Haynau about the conditions of the capitulation of the fortress. These conditions were as follows:
- The soldiers could leave without their arms, while the officers could leave retaining theirs;
- Those officers who prior to the Hungarian War of Independence were in the Austrian army received passports to leave the country;
- Those who did not want to leave could return home, without being prosecuted;
- Those Hungarian officers who prior to the war were not in the Austrian army could return home, they were free to work in any profession, start businesses, but they were prohibited to be conscripted in the army again;
- The former soldiers of the Habsburg armies received total amnesty;
- Those who wanted to leave the country had to ask for passports in 30 days;
- The officers received payment for 30 days, while the simple soldiers for 10 days in Austrian banknotes (equivalent to 500 000 Forint's);
- The vouchers used as money by the soldiers and the people of Komárom during the siege, would be redeemed in Austrian banknotes;
- The crippled, the sick and the wounded people and soldiers who were in the hospitals of Komárom would receive medical attendance;
- Everybody would retain their personalities and realties.

The amnesty given by the Austrians regarded only the soldiers but Klapka knew that the civilian population, intellectuals or politicians, who lived or retreated in Komárom, who participated in the Hungarian revolution and politics could be prosecuted by the Austrians after the surrender of Komárom. So he gave to all of them military certificates. Between 2–5 October 1849 Klapka surrendered the fortress to Haynau, with this ending the Hungarian War of Independence.

Before the fortress was handed over on 2–4 October, Klapka bid farewell to his soldiers which ended with these lines:

You have bowed before the iron stick of the events - this circumstance and the honor [of our nation] you have saved should be a comfort to you all! Accept the warmest thanks of the country for your manly and determined struggles! Accept also my most heartfelt and most intimate farewell. God bless you all!

On 2 October the Hungarian troops started to evacuate one by one the fortifications and different buildings of the fortress and the town. The soldiers formed lines before the Starfort (Csillagerőd), while the military orchestra played the Klapka March. Then came Klapka, who rode before their lines, then he stopped on the middle and said goodbye to them. Then the soldiers put their weapons in stacks and took farewell to each other. In the end, all of them received Geleitscheins (safe conduct papers), which assured them their total freedom and immunity.

At the end, Klapka declared:

We had done what the human capacity can achieve, and we can stand before God's and the world's court without shame.

Indeed, in the history of the 1848-1849 European revolutions, only Komárom and Venice put their weapons down with such favorable conditions. The capitulation of Komárom was the last event from the Hungarian Revolution and War of Independence, and it was the last place in the European revolutions of 1848-1849, which ended the resistance against the united forces of the monarchies.

So the capitulation of Komárom by Klapka was the last military event of the European 1848-49 Revolutions.

== Exile ==
Klapka left the country at once, and lived thenceforward for many years in exile, at first in England and afterwards chiefly in Switzerland. He became a Swiss citizen, settled in Geneva and started to work in the financial services, becoming even a deputy in the Swiss parliament. He went to Istanbul, working at a bank. He continued by every means in his power to work for the independence of Hungary, especially at moments of European wars, such as 1854, 1859 and 1866, at which an appeal to arms seemed to him to promise success. Using his international reputation as a great Hungarian general, won in the press of the European countries, he became a sort of "wandering ambassador" of the Hungarian cause, trying to win supporters to start a new Hungarian freedom war.

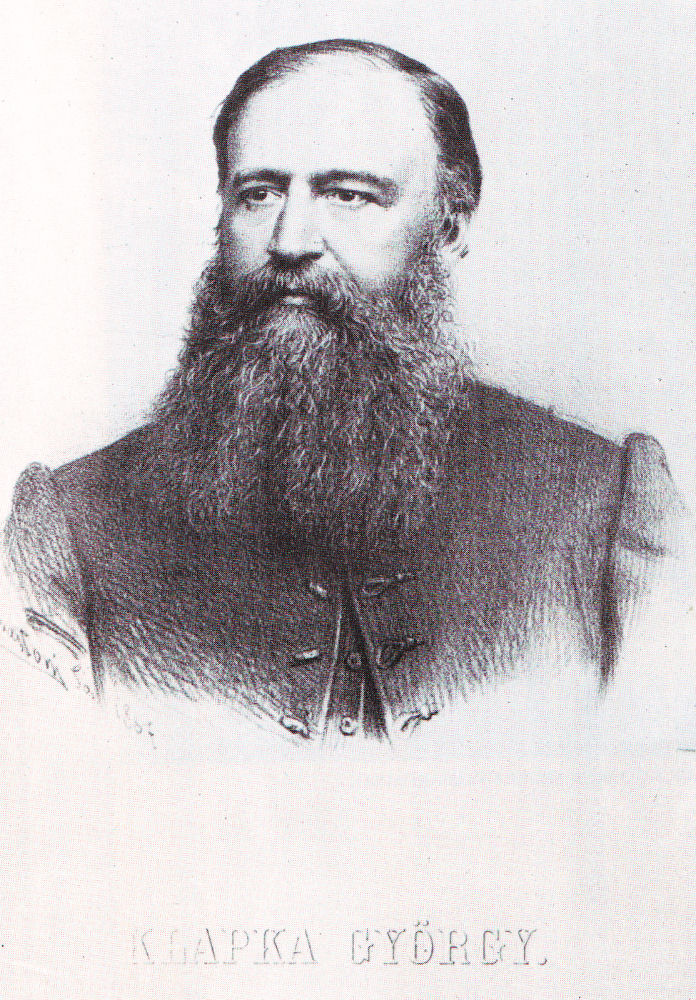
The old György Klapka

He tried to create an alliance with the states and nations which were neighbours with Hungary, like the Principality of Serbia or Moldavia and Wallachia, and supported the Polish Uprising of 1863–1864 against Russia. In 1859, Alexander John Cuza, the first Ruler of the United Principalities of Wallachia and Moldavia, offered general Klapka military support asking for a favourable reconfiguration of other peoples' situation in the Habsburg Empire (including Romanians): "In May 1859 two agreements were signed between Alexandru Ioan Cuza and general Klapka, commander of the Hungarian revolutionaries, by which A. I. Cuza commits to obtain and provide weapons to Hungarian revolutionaries, helping them against Austria, at the same time setting the principles for reconciliation between the nationalities of Austria." During the Crimean War (1853-1856), the Ottoman government wanted to appoint him as a commander of an army, but they renounced upon the protests of Austria.

=== Hungarian corps ===
During the Second Italian War of Independence (1859) he used his influence to help Lajos Kossuth to meet and sign an agreement with Napoleon III the emperor of France, to organize, in 1862, in Italy a Hungarian Legion from the Hungarian soldiers from Italy, which had to break in Hungary, and organize a rebellion there against the Habsburgs. Klapka, who became a member of the Hungarian National Directorate (Magyar Nemzeti Igazgatóság), which was fulfilling the role of a Hungarian government in exile. Klapka was appointed to organize and then lead the Hungarian Legion of Italy but it was not Napoleon's interest to destroy the Habsburg Empire, so, after the Battle of Solferino he concluded a peace treaty with the Habsburgs, without asking the Italians' or the Hungarians' opinion. As a result of this the Hungarian Legion disbanded, and Klapka protested against this by retiring. He was more and more disappointed with Kossuth's role and activity in leading the fight for the Hungarian cause in Europe, believing that Kossuth's policy was condemned to fail.

When the Austro-Prussian War from 1866 broke out, the Hungarian politicians and officers in exile agreed with the Minister President of Prussia Otto von Bismarck to form a Hungarian Legion, which had to fight against Austria, and start a national uprising in Hungary. The only problem was that the Prussians gave him the acceptance to organize the Hungarian legion too late, after their decisive victory over the Austrians in the Battle of Königgrätz. Once again Klapka was designated to organize a Hungarian corps in Silesia, and as major-general to lead it into Hungary. He gathered 1,500 soldiers from war prisoners and volunteers, organizing them in an infantry battalion, a hussar company, and a battery. When on 26 July the blessing of the Legion's flag was performed at Neisse, the preliminary Pruso-Austrian ceasefire negotiations were already started. In this situation Klapka had strong doubts about the chances of success without Prussian support. He was informed about the armistice when he was preparing to cross the Hungarian border, and the Prussians asked him to retreat, and stop his military actions. But he refused and crossed the Silesian-Moravian-Hungarian border in the Moravka valley, and at 14:00 on 2 August (or 3 August, according to Zsolt Vesztróczy) entering Hungarian territory through the Jablonka Pass.

He advanced until Turzófalva, but the Slovak population which lived there did not want to join his troops. Then Klapka's 1,500 soldiers were met by much superior Austrian troops, which tried to encircle him, so, in order to escape he had to retreat back in Silesia. Klapka protested against this betrayal by the Prussians, retired, and once again, the Hungarian Legion was disbanded.

== Return ==
After the Austro-Hungarian Compromise of 1867 Klapka was permitted to return to his native country, but as well as in the case of Artúr Görgei, the emperor Franz Joseph I of Austria did not allow him to join the army, because he did not forgive his campaign attempt in Hungary from 1866. As a result of this Klapka turned to politics, between 1868 and 1872 becoming member of the right wing Deák Party, being elected in the Hungarian Parliament as a deputy of Illava, then his hometown Temesvár. He did not speak often from the pulpit, instead he edited a political magazine. In 1868 he became the president of the associations of the Hungarian veteran soldiers of 1848–1849.

After a while he retired from politics and tried his luck in economy, spending his time in Istanbul and Genoa, founding businesses there.

In 1864 he married Inez Martha d'Arbouin, daughter of an English businessman settled in Brussels. They settled in France and had two sons and a daughter: György, Ernő and Márta. In this period Klapka spent much of his time in Cognac.

From the 1870s, Klapka could not withstand homesickness, so he returned to Hungary. He was celebrated by the crowd in Budapest and in other towns, he was offered to return in politics, but he refused, continuing to work in finance.

In 1877 he tried to convince Hungary to open a war against the Russians to help the Ottomans. During the Russo-Turkish War (1877–1878) he became a military counselor of the Ottoman army.

In his last years he lived in the Archduke Joseph Hotel (József Főherceg Szálloda) in Budapest. He died on 17 May 1892 in Budapest. His coffin was escorted to the cemetery by a huge crowd singing the Klapka March. The first handful of earth which was thrown on his coffin was taken from Komárom, the fortress which he defended so heroically in 1849. He was buried in the Kerepesi Cemetery in Budapest. A memorial was erected to his memory at Komárom in 1896 and the city's museum was named after him.

== Personal ==
=== Appearance and personality ===
He was slender, of medium stature, with an elegant, delicate appearance: his dark glossy, moony eyes showed a spirited, poetic personality, fiery bravery and seas of beautiful conceptions. His dark hair, cambering slightly on the high, delicate forehead, and his long dense black beard completed the nice, noble and manly face.

— Péter Szillányi, chief of Klapka's general staff

=== Klapka's qualities, skills as military commander ===
Klapka had a high military qualification, he was a reasonable theorist and a great strategist, the military history being always his favourite reading. As commander we can hold only one flaw against him: that he was still too young, and because of this he had many fantasies, which error ameliorated day after day.

— Péter Szillányi

Klapka was one of the most genius commanders, having higher military culture, to which he could add wordly culture too. He was a good general and he excelled with high military ideas, but moreover he was the man of the sentiments, in contrast with Görgei's rigid strong-mindedness. In his personal relations, as a soldier, although he was inclined to follow Görgei, but he was a better patriot, than to refuse to cooperate with the government. But this relation often paralyzed his capacity of decision. He was a chief too humane, and besides an excellent brother in arms. He was the enemy of any violence, and if in critical situations he had to show hustle, he was able to show his humanity also in these cases.

— Richárd Gelich, officer, military historian and theorist

== Author ==
He wrote the following works:

- Memoiren von Georg Klapka (April-October, 1849.). Mit einem Anhange, die historischen Actenstücke enthaltend, dem Porträt des Verfassers, einer Karte von Ungarn und dem Plane des Kriegsschauplatzes in Komorn. Leipzig, 1850 (in German) (full text)
- Der Nationalkrieg in Ungarn und Siebenbürgen in den Jahren 1848 und 1849. Mit einer Karte von Ungarn. Leipzig, 1851 (in German) (full text)
- Der Krieg im Orient in den Jahren 1853 und 1854 bis Endre Juli 1855. Eine historisch-kritische Skizze der Feldzüge an der Donau, in Asien und in der Krim, mit einem Blick auf die mögliche Wendung der künftigen Kriegsereignisse. Geneva, 1855. (in German) (full text)
- The eastern question. Translated from the German, with a preface and appendix by Humphry William Freeland. London. (1877)
- Emlékeimből Függelékül: gróf Teleki László levelei. Bpest, 1886. arczk. Bud. Szemle XLV. 1886 (in Hungarian) (full text)

Here were mentioned only the original editions in the language in which Klapka wrote them. These books were translated very quickly in English, French, German and Hungarian.

Besides of these he wrote many articles in Hungarian and foreign newspapers and magazines, like: La Presse from Paris, Independence from Bruxelles, and Pesti Napló, Századunk, Honvédmenház Könyve, Pesti Hirlap, Nemzet, Budapesti Szemle, Ország-Világ, all these Hungarian newspapers and magazines.

== Legacy ==
In 1849, Béni Egressy wrote the Klapka March to honor Klapka as a great commander and Hungarian patriot.

The writer Jerome Klapka Jerome, best known for Three Men in a Boat, was named after him by his father who was impressed by György Klapka's reputation as a great general and patriot, when the latter was spending his time in Great Britain.

== Sources ==
- Babucs, Zoltán (2020), "A "komáromi oroszlán" születésének bicentenáriuma (The Bicentennial of the Birth of the "Lion of Komárom")", Magyar Hirlap 07 April 2020
- Bánlaky, József (2001). A magyar nemzet hadtörténelme (The Military History of the Hungarian Nation) (in Hungarian). Budapest: Arcanum Adatbázis.
- Bona, Gábor (2015). Tábornokok és törzstisztek az 1848/49. évi szabadságharcban (in Hungarian). Budapest: Nemzeti Kulturális Alap.
- Csikány, Tamás (2015). A szabadságharc hadművészete 1848–49 ("The Art of Warfare in the War of Independence of 1848–1849") (in Hungarian). Budapest: Zrínyi Katonai Kiadó. p. 380. ISBN 978-963-327-647-1.
- Csikány, Tamás (2013), "Egy céltalan haditerv - Komárom 1849 július 11" (PDF), Hadtörténelmi közlemények
- Hermann, Róbert (2004). Az 1848–1849-es szabadságharc nagy csatái ("Great battles of the Hungarian Revolution of 1848–1849") (in Hungarian). Budapest: Zrínyi. p. 408. ISBN 963-327-367-6.
- Hermann, Róbert (2001). Az 1848–1849-es szabadságharc hadtörténete ("Military History of the Hungarian Revolution of 1848–1849") (in Hungarian). Budapest: Korona Kiadó. p. 424. ISBN 963-9376-21-3.
- Hermann, Róbert (1999). "Az ihászi ütközet emlékkönyve 1849-1999 (Commemorative Book of the Battle of Ihász 1849-1999)". mek.oszk.hu. Pápa.
- Kerényi, Ferenc (2008). Petőfi Sándor élete és költészete (The Life and Poetry of Sándor Petőfi) (in Hungarian). Budapest: Osiris Kiadó. ISBN 978-963-389-983-0.
- Pusztaszeri, László (1984). Görgey Artúr a szabadságharcban ("Artúr Görgey in the War of Independence") (in Hungarian). Budapest: Magvető Könyvkiadó. p. 784. ISBN 963-14-0194-4.
- Tarján M., Tamás (2010), "1820. április 7. Klapka György születése Temesváron (7 April 1820. The Birth of György Klapka in Temesvár)", Rubicon. 2010 September
- Vesztróczy, Zsolt (2017), "125 éve hunyt el Klapka György, Komárom hős védője (Komárom's Hero Defender Died 125 Years Ago)", ujszo.com 21 May 2017
