= Klapka Induló =

Hungarian military march

The Klapka Induló (Klapka March), also known as Föl, föl, vitézek a csatára, (Rise, Rise Soldiers to the Battle) is a Hungarian military march written in the 19th century. It is named after General György Klapka who served as the Minister of War during the Hungarian Revolution of 1848. It was written in 1849 by composer and translator Béni Egressy to honor Klapka as a great commander and Hungarian patriot. Specifically, it was composed during the defense of the Komárno fortification system in the Fourth Battle of Komárom from Austro-Russian forces. On 4 August 1849, who was in the besieged Komárom at the time he wrote his composition, handed over the piece to revolutionary personnel. The lyrics to the march were later written in 1861 by Kálmán Thaly.

It is the official marchpast of the Hungarian Defence Forces, the preceding Hungarian People's Army and is played often today during the military parades in Budapest.

== Lyrics ==
Föl, föl, vitézek a csatára,
a szent szabadság oltalmára,
édes hazánkért hősi vérünk
ontjuk hullatjuk nagy bátran, míg élünk.

Föl, föl, látjátok lobogómat,
indulj utánam robogó had!
Zeng, dörg az ágyú, csattog a kard,
ez lelkesíti csatára a magyart!

Híres Komárom be van véve,
Klapka György a fővezére,
büszkén kiáll a csatatérre,
hajrá huszárok, utánam előre!
