= Battle of Alsónyárasd =

Coordinates: 47°57′30.5″N 17°48′33.3″E

- Part of the Hungarian Revolution of 1848
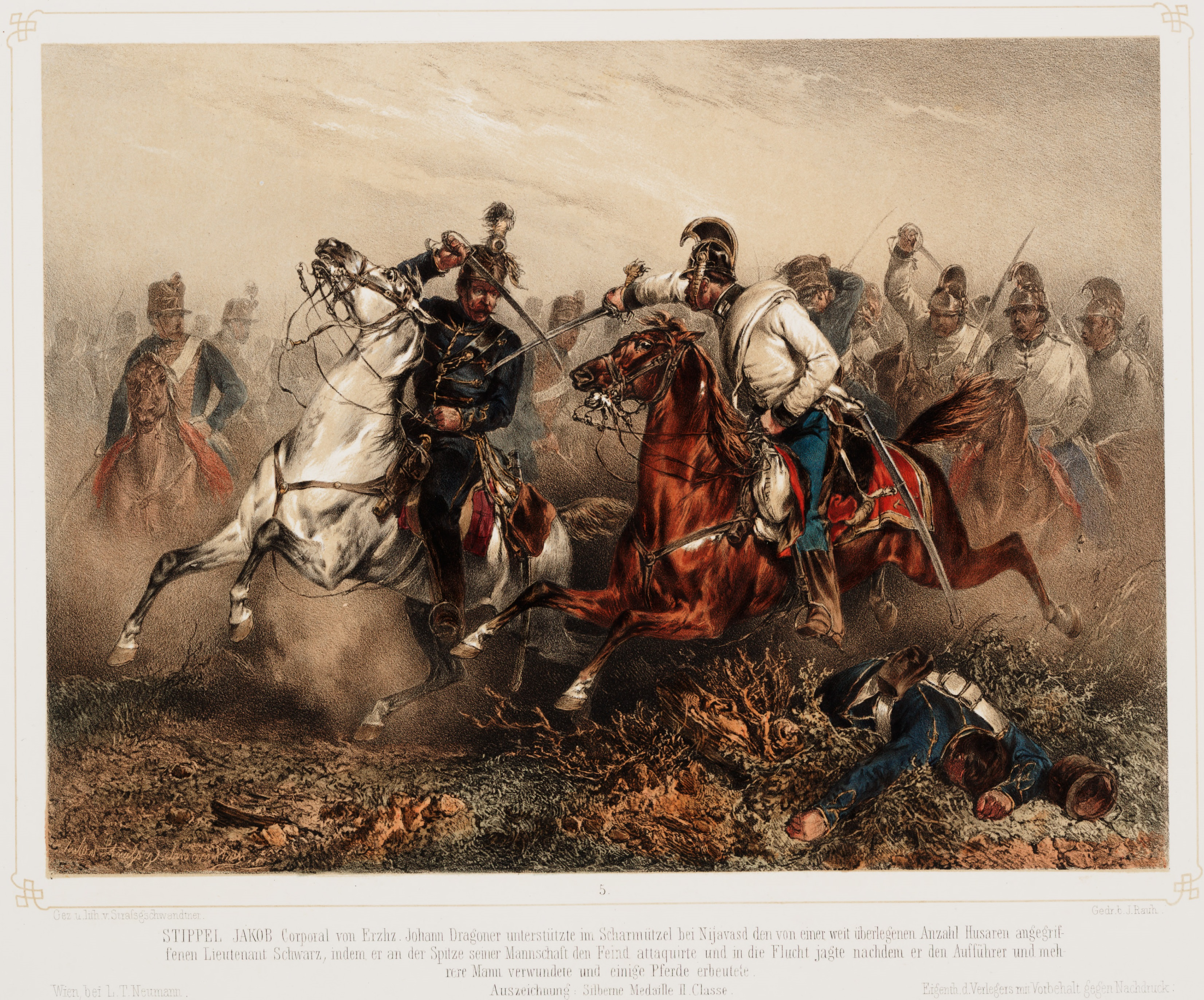
Date	20–21 June 1849
Location	around and in Alsónyárasd Kingdom of Hungary (now Nyárasd, Slovakia)
Result	Inconclusive

Belligerents
Hungarian Revolutionary Army	Austrian Empire

Commanders and leaders
György Klapka	Anton Csorich

Strength
VIII. corps: 6,200 (Note: According to Róbert Hermann 7832 Hungarian soldiers participated in the battle); 24 cannons	II. corps: 5,700; 48 cannons (Note: The size of the Austrian II. corps was 13,505, but probably not the whole corps participated in the battle. Gracza writes that Csorich had 5700 soldiers in the battle. Also to the Austrian II. corps belonged the Pott brigade of 4316 soldiers, which was detached from it and sent to guard Zsigárd, so they fought in the Battle of Pered. Because of this the number of the soldiers of the II. corps under Csorich, which participated in the Battle of Pered and Alsónyárasd from 20-21 June 1849, was 10,016.)

Casualties and losses
Unknown	Unknown

The Battle of Alsónyárasd, took place between 20 and 21 June 1849, in Alsónyárasd, as part of the Battle of Pered of the Summer Campaign of the Hungarian War of Independence.

During the first day of the Battle of Pered the Csallóköz region played a secondary role, representing the marching ground and supply route of the Hungarian troops. After discussing, in the morning of 20 June with General Artúr Görgei about the plan for the incoming battle of Pered, agreed that Klapka had to advance towards Vásárút, and to tie down the Austrian troops from Csallóköz. The detached troops from the VIII. corps, led by General Klapka advanced towards Vásárút, his intention being to tie down the attention of the Austrians from Csallóköz. But at the same time the Austrian II. corps too, led by Lieutenant General Anton Csorich, was sent to tie down the Hungarian troops from Csallóköz, and prevent them to send reinforcements to the Vág river. They advanced on both banks of the Danube's Érsekújvár branch. On 20 June in the morning Lieutenant General Csorich, after leaving garrisons at the crossing points of Eperjes and Nádszeg, sent a column of 2 battalions 4 cavalry companies, and 18 cannons from Vásárút to Aszód, another column from Albár to Nagymegyer, and the Reischach brigade (Note: Reischach was a brigade general of the I. corps, which did not participate in the battle, so probably Bánlaky confounded him with Major General Baron Joseph Johann Nepomuk Freiherr von Barco, commander of one of the brigades of the II. corps.) through Csilizatas to Nagymegyer. Klapka arrived with the Kosztolányi division to Aszód, deploying along both sides of the road heading to Gúta, and around the noon he was informed about the approach of the enemy. In order to avoid being attacked in the vicinity of the bridge, which he had to defend, he decided to advance toward the approaching enemy. For this purpose he sent Colonel Móric Kosztolányi with 2 battalions, 1 hussar company, and 4 cannons on the road to Gúta, Colonel Rohonczy with 3 companies of the newly founded Károlyi hussars and a cavalry battery through Királyfölde to Albár, Colonel count Zichy with a smaller column from Apácaszakállas to Alsónyárasd, and Colonel Janik had to follow Kosztolányi's and Rohonczy's columns as a reserve, with the 64. and 18. battalions, a cavalry company, and 4 cannons.

When Csorich's left column arrived at Alsónyárasd, he was informed about the approach of the Hungarians, so he deployed his troops he deployed his infantry in the village and the small woods near the Little Danube, the cavalry on the right flank, outside the village, while the artillery remained, for now, behind Alsónyárasd. The commander of the cavalry, colonel Rohonczy, attacked, and took control over the above mentioned small woods, and right when he was preparing to attack Alsónyárasd, he was attacked by 2 companies of Civalart Uhlans and 2 companies of the Liechtenstein Chevau-léger regiment, which forced the Károlyi hussars to retreat. Klapka sent a company of the Hunyady hussars against the Austrian cavalrymen pursuing the retreating Károlyi hussars, (Note: According to Bánlaky they were "Kászonyi" hussars, but such kind of hussar regiment did not exist. He probably confounded the Kászonyi name with the Károlyi, which was indeed the name of the 16th Hussar regiment.) and with the help of a battery, they managed to stop them. Meanwhile, Rohonczy reorganized his hussars and sent them again to attack, but they were repulsed again. At this moment the Austrian infantry broke out of Nyárasd, forcing the Károlyi hussars, also threatened from the left by the Austrian cavalry, to retreat. The Austrian cavalry pursued Kosztolányi's retreating 2 battalions, pushing back again also the hussars' which tried to stop them. As a result of this the situation of Klapka's troops became critical. Janik's and Zichy's columns finally arrived, thanks to which Klapka reorganized his troops. Seeing this, Csorich ordered his troops to retreat from the battlefield in the direction of Vásárút, while Klapka retreated towards Aszód. to defend the bridges at Aszódpuszta and Guta. So ended the first day of the Battle.

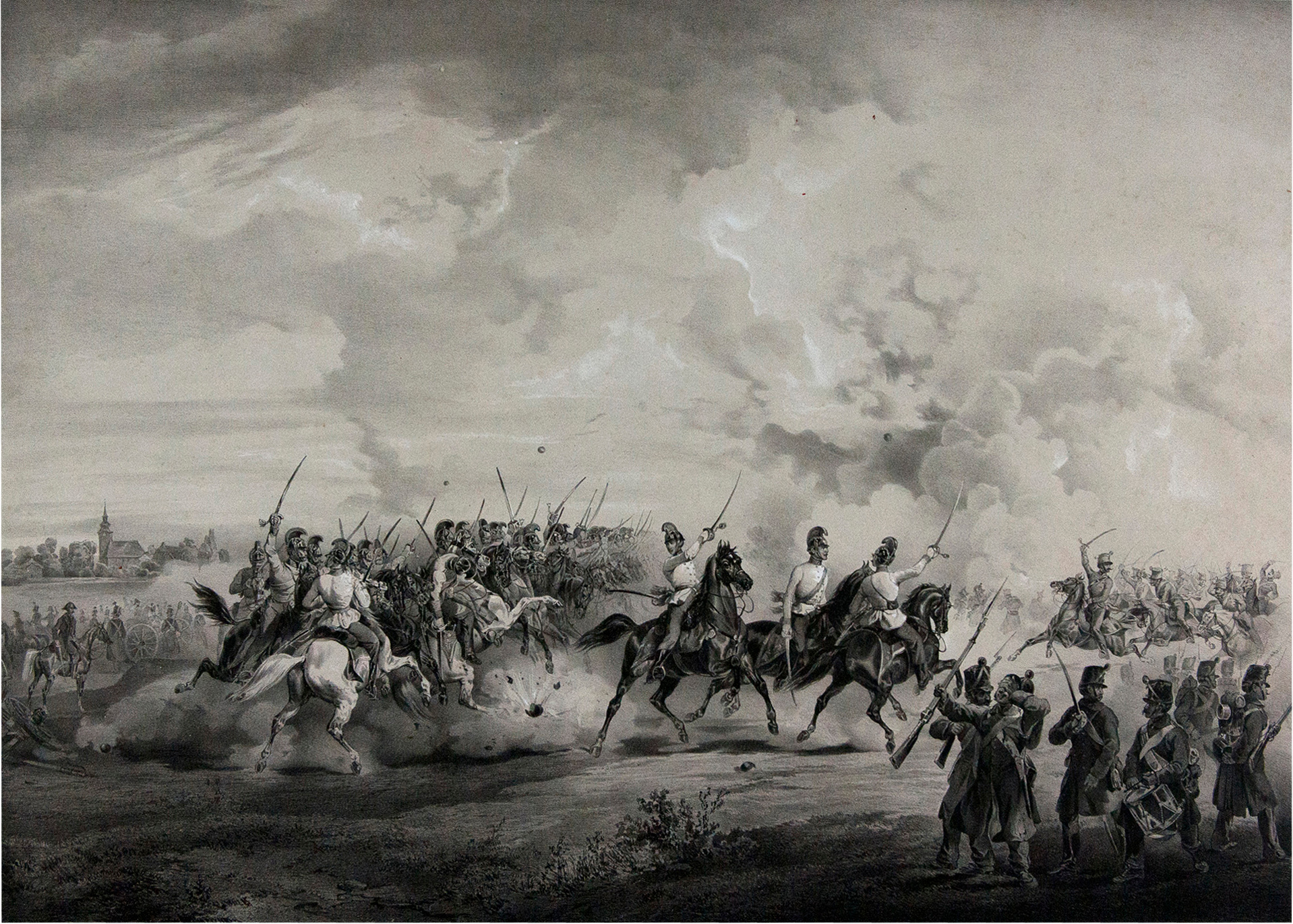
Battle of Alsónyárasd 20 June 1849

On the 20th, Lieutenant General Csorich received orders from Haynau to facilitate Wohlgemuth's attack the following day, with the bulk of the Liebler Brigade and Simbschen's cavalry brigade to make an offensive movement on the left bank of the Danube at Ersekújvár through Nádszeg towards Seregakol, i.e. to the flanks and rear of the Hungarians, while from Vásárút towards Aszód he was to confine himself to a strong demonstration. But pointing at the weakness of Csorich's forces and the great distance to be covered, he completely abandoned the offensive movement on the left bank, and on the 21st he decided to carry out only a demonstration in Csallóköz; but even this he started late, only in the afternoon of the 21st.

On 21 June at the bridge from Aszód, Klapka, with the detached units of the VIII. Hungarian corps, confined himself to defense, deploying, under the leadership of Colonel Móric Kosztolányi, 2 battalions with 4 three-pounder cannons, 1000 paces from the bridge, on the road to Gúta towards Nyárasd; and 2 infantry battalions, 4 cavalry companies and a cavalry battery under the leadership of Colonel Janik around Aszód; the two groupings were linked to each other by 1 cavalry company; while the smaller column of Colonel count Zichy remained at Apácaszakállas. The Austrian column sent against Aszód arrived there between 6 and 7 p.m., forcing the vanguard of Kosztolányi to retreat. At 7:00 p.m., right when the vanguard of the retreating II. Hungarian corps arrived at the bridge from Aszód, General Sigmund von Reischach (or Barco) deployed his artillery against Kosztolányi's artillery, which, despite its numerical inferiority, withstood the enemy fire, but when 2 of its cannons became unusable, the Hungarians were forced to retreat. At this moment a half battery and two companies of the Württemberg hussars, sent by Görgei, arrived on the battlefield, thanks to which Klapka reoccupied the lost positions, then continued the artillery duel with the Austrians until nightfall. Thanks to this, the II. Hungarian corps, retreating from the Battle of Pered, crossed the bridge from Aszód without any problem, escaping the pursuing enemy troops, then Klapka ordered the destruction of the bridge to prevent the enemy from crossing the Érsekújvár Danube branch.

== Sources ==
- Bánlaky, József (2001). A magyar nemzet hadtörténelme ("The Military History of the Hungarian Nation) (in Hungarian). Budapest: Arcanum Adatbázis.
- Bóna, Gábor (1987). Tábornokok és törzstisztek a szabadságharcban 1848–49 ("Generals and Staff Officers in the War of Independence 1848–1849") (in Hungarian). Budapest: Zrínyi Katonai Kiadó. p. 430. ISBN 963-326-343-3.
- Gracza, György (1894–1898). Az 1848–1849-iki magyar szabadságharcz története I-V("The History of the Hungarian War of Independence of 1848–1849") (in Hungarian). Budapest: Lampel Róbert (Wodianer F. és Fiai) Kiadása. p. 1022.
- Hermann, Róbert (2001). Az 1848–1849-es szabadságharc hadtörténete ("Military History of the Hungarian War of Independence of 1848–1849") (in Hungarian). Budapest: Korona Kiadó. p. 424. ISBN 963-9376-21-3.
- Hermann, Róbert (2004). Az 1848–1849-es szabadságharc nagy csatái ("Great battles of the Hungarian War of Independence of 1848–1849") (in Hungarian). Budapest: Zrínyi. p. 408. ISBN 963-327-367-6.
- Kemény, Krisztián (2022), ""Oh, huszár, huszár! te vagy a magyar szeme fénye." Huszárok az 1848-49. évi magyar szabadságharcban", Ars Militaria
- Kemény, Krisztián (2018), ""Tüntetés" a fővezér ellen? Görgei Artúr, Asbóth Lajos és a II. hadtest tisztikarának nyilatkozata - 1849. június 22." (PDF), Aetas
- Pusztaszeri, László (1984). Görgey Artúr a szabadságharcban ("Artúr Görgey in the War of Independence") (in Hungarian). Budapest: Magvető Könyvkiadó. p. 784. ISBN 963-14-0194-4.
