= Battle of Hetény =

Battle of the Hungarian War of Independence of 1848–1849

Coordinates: 47°48′50.7″N 18°13′07.9″E

- Part of the Hungarian Revolution of 1848
Date	5 September 1849
Location	near Hetény, Kingdom of Hungary, today part of Slovakia
Result	Hungarian victory

Belligerents
Hungarian Revolutionary Army	Russian Empire

Commanders and leaders
György Klapka; Lajos Csomortányi	Unknown

Strength
c. 315 hussars	300–350 cossacks

Casualties and losses
	7 dead; 12 wounded; many horses

The Battle of Hetény, fought on 5 September 1849, between Hungarian Hussars led by General György Klapka and a Russian detachment of Cossacks was one of the last battles of the Hungarian War of Independence. After the surrender of the Hungarian army led by General Artúr Görgei at Szőlős, one of the last strongholds of the Hungarian independence was the fortress of Komárom, which now was being surrounded by Austrian and Russian troops. The small reconnaissance unit of Hungarian hussars which tried to acquire knowledge about the enemy's strength, was attacked by a platoon of Russian cossacks, but the Hungarians defeated them, using the tactic of feigned retreat. This kind of small scaled battles and skirmishes between Hungarian troops with the Austrian and Russian besieging units continued until the surrender of the fortress of Komárom on 2 October 1849.

== Background ==
After the Hungarian garrison broke the Austrian blockade in the Fourth Battle of Komárom from 3 August 1849 around the fortress, the troops led by General György Klapka advanced to West, liberating an important territory from the Austrian occupation, entering, on 6 August even in the city of Győr, and recruiting 5000-6000 fresh soldiers, which they organized in 5 new battalions.

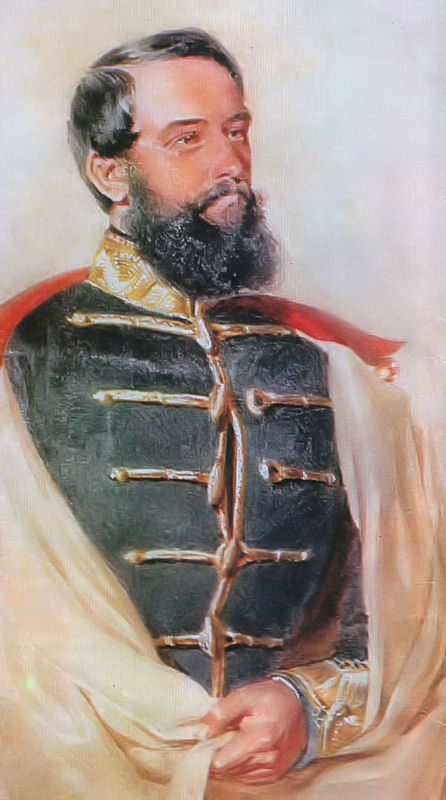
Sterio Károly: Klapka_György

But on the evening of 11 August right when he was planning to continue his campaign towards Vienna, and celebrated his victories with his officers through a banquet, Pál Almásy, the Speaker of the House of Representatives arrived, and told him that the Hungarian armies were defeated at Segesvár, Debrecen, and Szőreg, and that there was no hope left for the winning the war of independence. These news devastated Klapka, who, when on 13 August received the news of the decisive Hungarian defeat in the Battle of Temesvár from 9 August, he understood that it is no more hope left, so he decided to retreat with his troops to Komárom.

The defenders retreated behind the walls of Komárom, and on 19 August the siege closed in again. This time for good. In addition to the Imperial troops, Russian troops also participated in the encirclement of Komárom, demanding its surrender, trying to convince them to do this by saying that the Hungarian main army (the Army of the Northern Danube) led by General Artúr Görgei, unconditionally surrendered to them at Szőlős, while the fortress of Pétervárad was about to surrender, so there is no more sense of further resistance. Despite this, the Hungarian military council of the defenders of Komárom refused to surrender, and even after the intervention of the Russian Lieutenant-Colonel Nikolai Vasilyevich Isakov, the decision was not changed, but on 21 August the two parties agreed to a two-week truce. During this time, the defenders sent officers to learn if the Austrians and the Russians are saying the truth, and were able to ascertain that the Army of the Northern Danube army had indeed surrendered, during this time the enemy refrained from tightening the siege ring. On 1 September, the officers' delegation returned to Komárom, with the news that the Austrians tell the truth, the Hungarian armies surrendered, and despite knowing that the Hungarian war of independence ended in defeat, the military council decided to insist on the free departure of the whole garrison in exchange for the surrender of the fortress, and that a general pardon be granted to Hungary and to all the Hungarian army, that the banknotes of the revolution to be redeemable and that all those who wish to live the country, to be provided with passports.

== Prelude ==
The two-week armistice expired the next day, and the Imperial and Russian forces laid a full blockade on Komárom. Marshal Count Gilbert Laval Nugent von Westmeath's Imperial II. Reserve Corps and the division of the Russian Lieutenant General Pavel Grabbe joined the besiegers, bringing their strength to 54,000 soldiers and 210 guns, compared to 24,000-26,000 soldiers and 519 guns in the defending army. Nugent took over the command of the 'Komárom blockade', and sent the defenders a letter from Field Marshal Julius Jacob von Haynau dated 31 August, advising General György Klapka, not to surrender to the Russians, which would only be to the detriment of the garrison, while if the castle should open its gates to the Austrians, Klapka could count on Haynau's "generosity" only for himself'. The answer came quickly from Komárom: negotiations were already in progress and the castle would not be surrendered on a pardon. Klapka wanted to be sure that the fortress was indeed completely surrounded, so he ordered a Reconnaissance-in-force with a small force. In the autumn of 1848, the Jászkun District decided to set up a Hussar regiment bearing the name of chieftain Lehel, which was later given the number 14 among the Hussar regiments. The nickname Lehull-huszár (Falls down hussar) was attached to them by the infantrymen, as their recruits initially used to fall off their freshly saddled half-tamed horses backs, but with time they became good hussars in the spring campaign and the sieges of Arad and Temesvár. The three companies of Lehel-Hussars (315 in Komárom) under the command of Major Kálmán Bobory of Szenttornya, belonging to the Komárom garrison, were joined later by another company, the cavalry of the detachment of Major Gáspár Noszlopy.

== Battle ==
On September 5, the Hungarian outposts at Ógyalla and Komáromszentpéter reported that they were attacked by Cossack units.

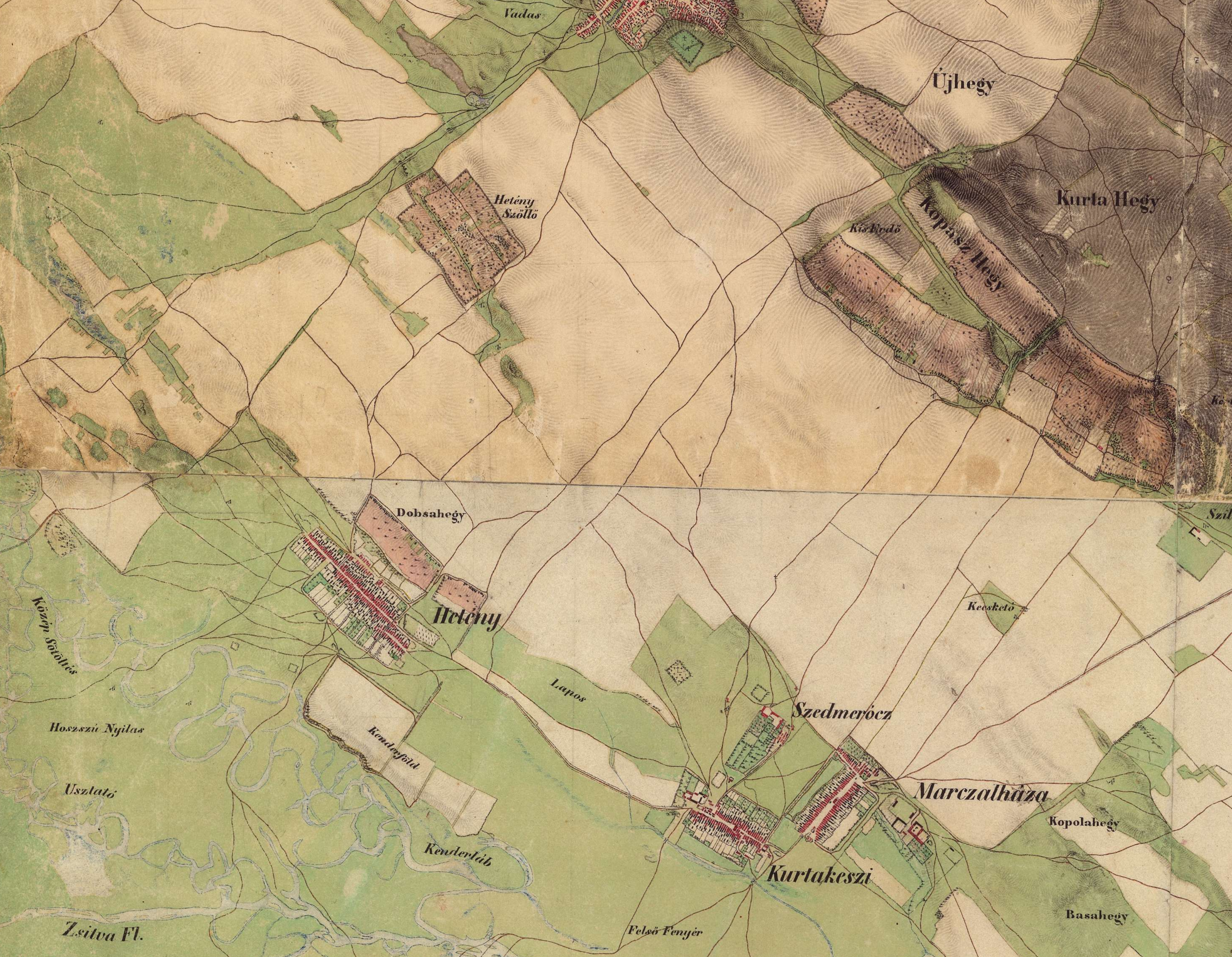
Hetény and its surroundings at the middle of the 19th century

On hearing this news, Klapka, spurred by an irresistible desire to see the world-famous Cossacks face to face, went to Hetény, taking a few officers from his staff with him. Three companies of Lehel Hussars (the 4-6. companies of the 14. hussar regiment) under the command of Captain Csomortányi were posted in a covered position in front of the village Hetény, when the 3 sotnias strong (300-350 men) Cossack troops belonging to the 6. İnfantry division of the 45. Don Cossack Cavalry Regiment were seen slowly approaching in a thick mass, coming from the direction of Ógyalla. Some of the horsemen, who had arrived at about 700 paces from Hetény, galloped forward, firing with their long rifles at the hussars. Klapka ordered the hussars to fight the Cossacks. The Hungarians left one hussar company in a covered position near Hetény, while the other two rode into the nearby woods, in order to flank the Cossacks without being seen. The company stationing at Hetény was ordered to make a feigned retreat in order to lure the Cossacks closer.

The trick worked. As soon as the hussars turned their backs on the enemy, the whole Cossack detachment rushed after them with fury, and had almost reached the village of Hetény, when Captain Csomortányi rushed out of the woods with two companies and attacked the Cossacks from the side and in the rear. Seeing this the Cossacks started to flee. The company in front of Hetény also attacked them from the front, and so the victory was complete. 12 prisoners were taken, 7 were killed, and the rest were chased far beyond Komáromszentpéter.

== Aftermath ==
During all the afternoon the Cossacks only showed themselves from a fair distance. In the evening, however, a large cavalry detachment came out of Ógyalla. Being greatly outnumbered, the hussars had no desire to fight, but they retreated to the fortress of Komárom, taking with them the pikes, rifles, pistols, handguns, and the captured Cossacks. When they were presented to Klapka, they touched the ground with their foreheads and begged for mercy. According to the Hungarians their horses were not worth much, being small and thin nomadic horses. Later that day, late in the evening, Csomortányi reported that he had been forced to retreat to Izsa, pressed by a strong Russian Ulan cavalry platoon. At Kurtakeszi, however, he made a brilliant attack with his three companies against this platoon and pushed them back, capturing 2 fine big horses. There was also an outpost skirmish at the forest of Ács. The enemy, took the Ács forest, driving the Hungarian outposts back from it. The fortress was from that time on considered to be completely surrounded. According to the "army order" of the next day in Komárom, Major Bobory from the ranks of the 14th Lehel Hussar Regiment, was promoted to the rank of Lieutenant Colonel, and Captain Csomortányi to the rank of Major. The battle of Hetény and the reconnaissances and outpost skirmishes that continued until 10 September made it clear to Klapka that Komárom was indeed surrounded by a significant and superior enemy force.

For his exploits in this battle and the skirmishes which followed, Lajos Csomortányi was awarded with the 3rd class of the Hungarian Military Medal on 28 September in recognition of his valour and determination.

== Sources ==
- Babucs, Zoltán (2022), "A hetényi huszárcsíny", Magyarságkutató Intézet (04 september 2021) (in Hungarian)
- Babucs, Zoltán (2022), "Fejezetek a jászkún huszárok történetéből" (PDF), Jászsági Évkönyv (1994) (in Hungarian)
- Bánlaky, József (2001). A magyar nemzet hadtörténelme ("The Military History of the Hungarian Nation) (in Hungarian). Budapest: Arcanum Adatbázis.
- Bóna, Gábor (1987). Tábornokok és törzstisztek a szabadságharcban 1848–49 ("Generals and Staff Officers in the War of Independence 1848–1849") (in Hungarian). Budapest: Zrínyi Katonai Kiadó. p. 430. ISBN 963-326-343-3.
- Hermann, Róbert (2001). Az 1848–1849-es szabadságharc hadtörténete ("Military History of the Hungarian War of Independence of 1848–1849") (in Hungarian). Budapest: Korona Kiadó. ISBN 963-9376-21-3.
- Kemény, Krisztián (2022), ""Oh, huszár, huszár! te vagy a magyar szeme fénye." Huszárok az 1848-49. évi magyar szabadságharcban", Ars militaria (15 march 2022) (in Hungarian)
