= Komárno fortification system =

Fortification in Slovakia

Coordinates: 47.7533°N 18.1375°E

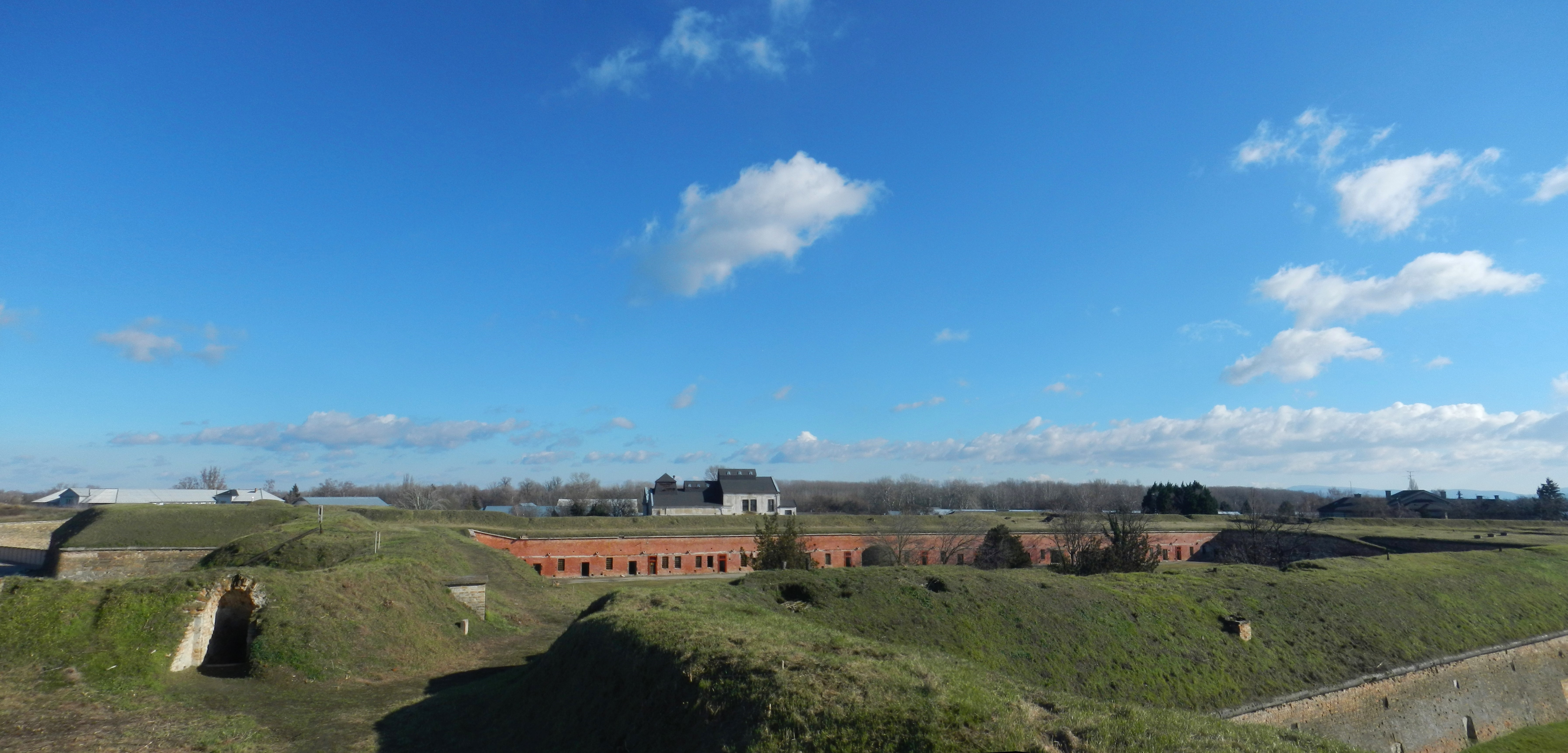
Old Fortress in Komárno

Komárno - Komárom fortification system is a system of forts, bastions, and fortifications in and around the towns of Komárno and Komárom (they were one town until the treaty of Trianon) on the banks of both the Danube and Váh rivers. The fortification system of town Komárno is the biggest fortification in Slovakia, and as a whole complex with fortifications on the Hungarian side of the Danube it is the biggest fortification in former Austro-Hungarian Empire.

== Components ==
- The central Fortress of Komárno at the confluence of Danube and Váh rivers:
  - Old Fortress strengthened after the Mongol Invasion in 1242.
  - New Fortress built from 1658.
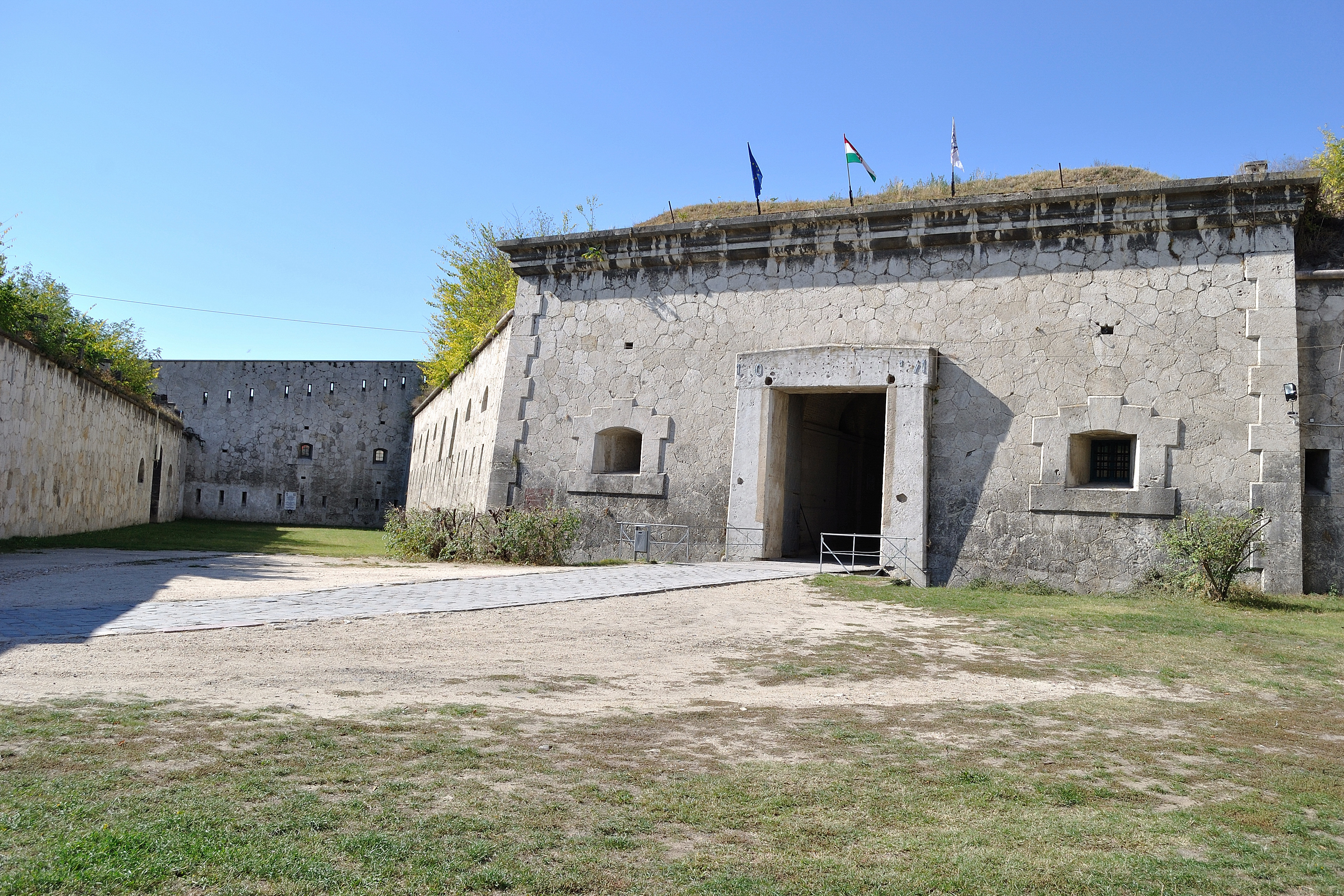
- Entrance of Fort Monostor
  City fortifications (with 16 large bastions and interconnecting walls):
  - Palatinus Line
  - Váh Line
- Váh bridge-head on the left bank of Váh (and Danube).
- Fort Monostor (Fort Sandberg) in Komárom on the right bank of Danube.
- Fort Csillag (the Star Fort, csillag meaning "star" in Hungarian language)
- Fort Igmánd

== Pictures ==
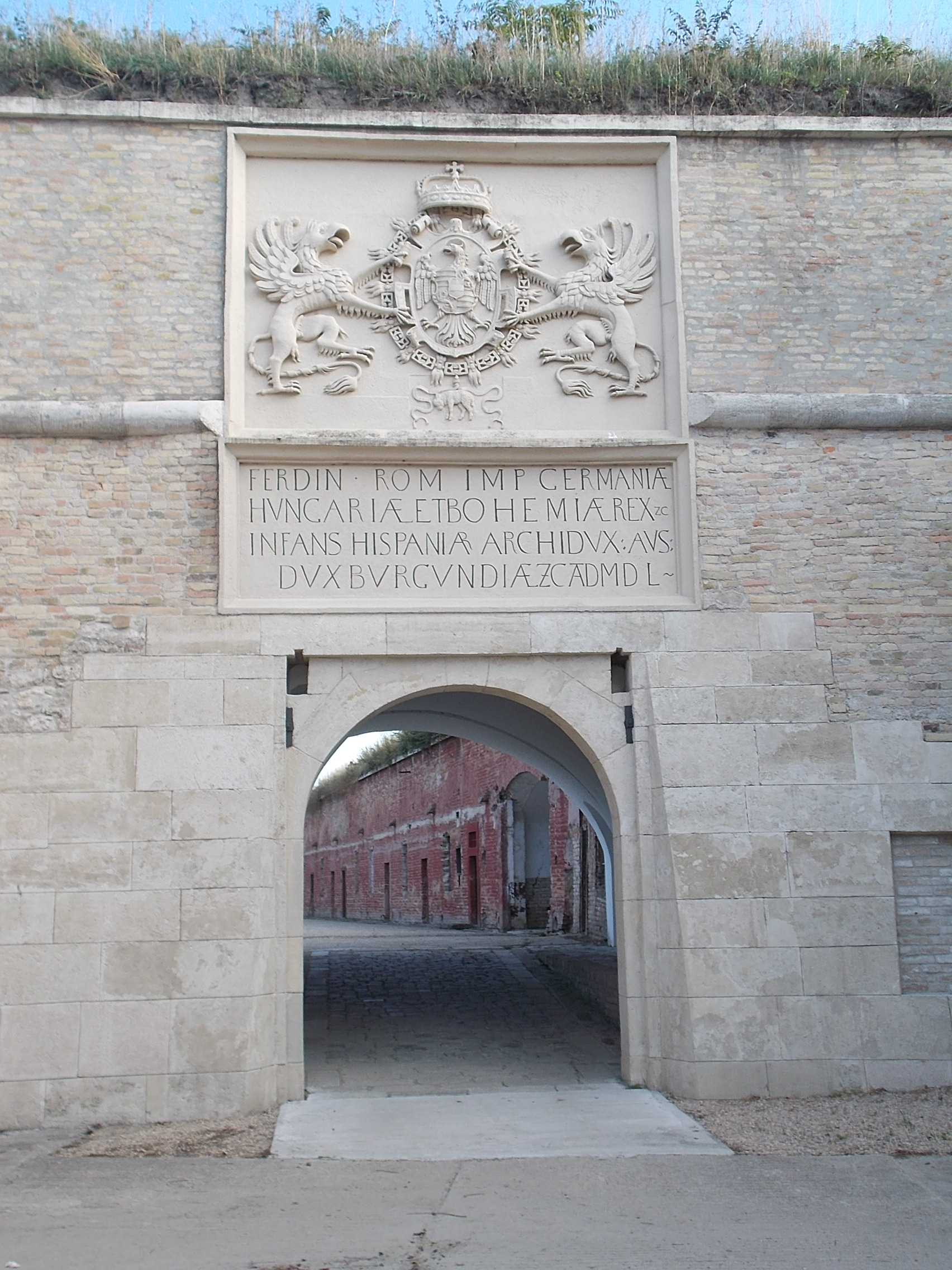
Ferdinand Gate of Old Fortress

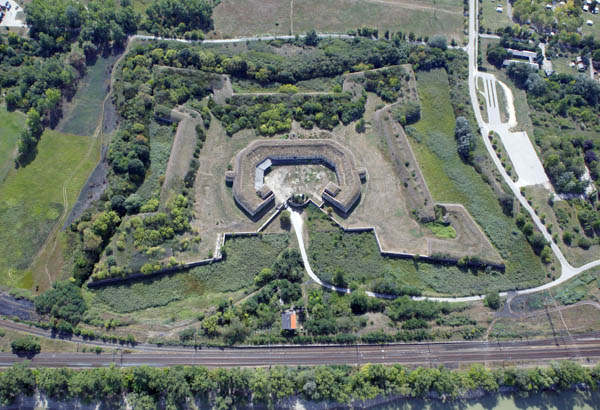
Fort Csillag

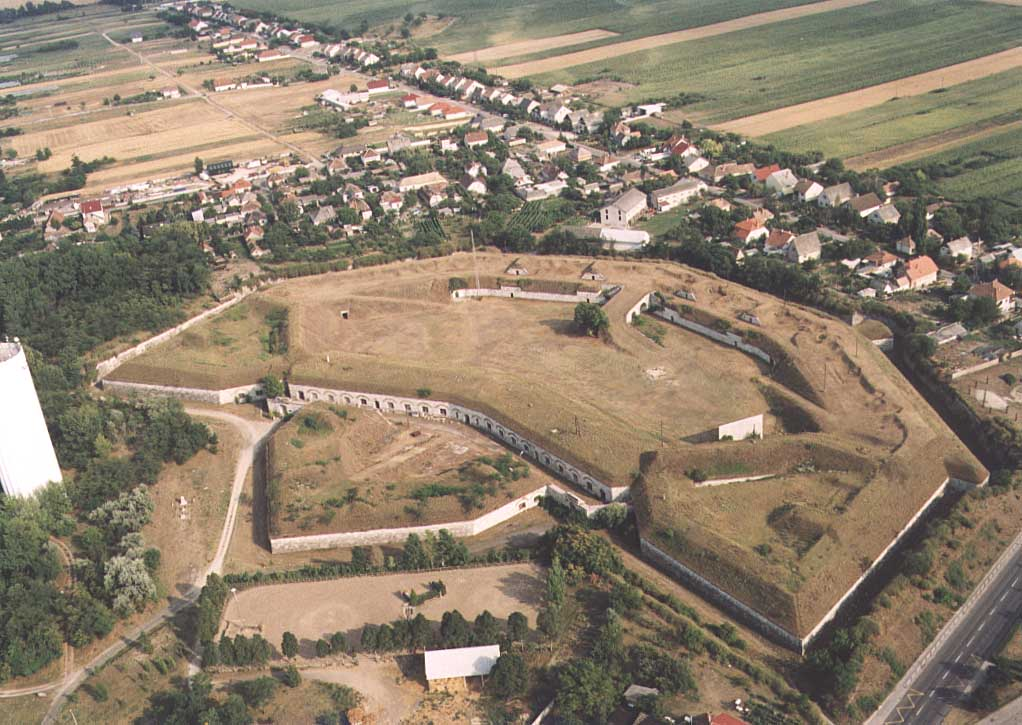
Fort Igmánd from the sky

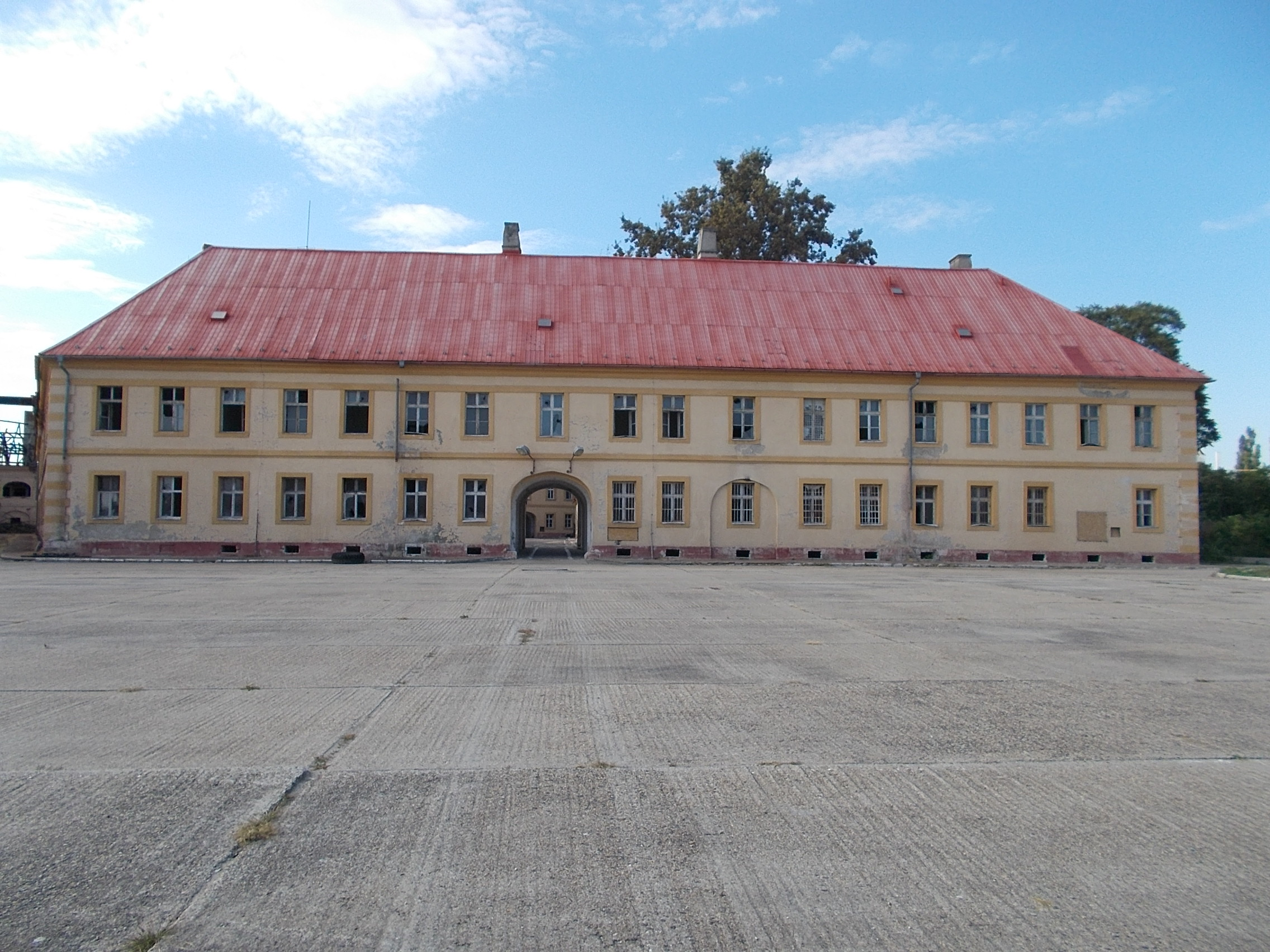
Barrack of the New Fortress

== See also ==
- Klapka Induló
