= Csillag =

Csillag is a Hungarian surname meaning "star". Notable people with the surname include:

- Balázs Csillag (born 1979), Hungarian long-distance runner
- Dárius Csillag (born 1995), Hungarian footballer
- Endre Csillag (born 1957), Hungarian guitarist
- Krisztián Csillag (born 1975), Hungarian footballer
- Levente Csillag (born 1973), Hungarian hurdler
- Róza Csillag (1832–1892), Hungarian mezzo-soprano
- Teréz Csillag (1862–1925), Hungarian actress

== See also ==
- Csillag's disease
- Csillag fortress — one of the tree fortresses defending Komárno — Komárom from the right bank of Danube — Monostor, Ingmand and Csillag fort (Danube bridgehead)
