= Topoľníky =

Topoľníky Nyárasd
- Municipality
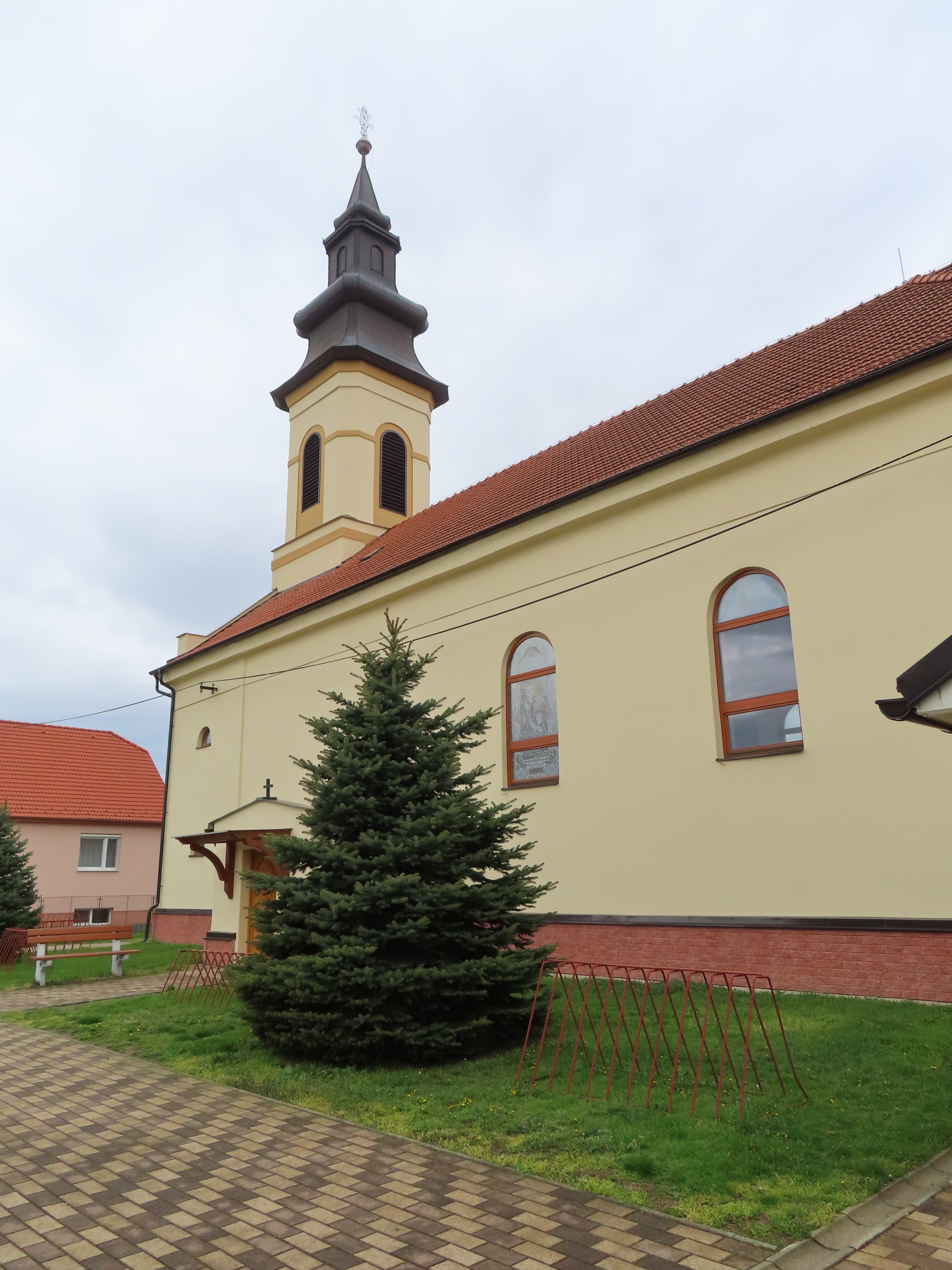

- Flag

- Location of Topoľníky in the Trnava Region Location of Topoľníky in Slovakia
- Coordinates: 47.97°N 17.78°E
- Country: Slovakia
- Region: Trnava Region
- District: Dunajská Streda District
- First mentioned: 1421

Government
  - Mayor: László Bacsó (Party of the Hungarian Coalition)

Area
  - Total: 34.81 km^{2} (13.44 sq mi)
- Elevation: 111 m (364 ft)

Population (2025)
  - Total: 3,102

Ethnicity
  - Hungarians: 93,03 %
  - Slovaks: 5,24 %
- Time zone: UTC+1 (CET)
  - Summer (DST): UTC+2 (CEST)
- Postal code: 930 11
- Area code: +421 31
- Vehicle registration plate (until 2022): DS
- Website: www.topolniky.sk

Topoľníky (Hungarian: Nyárasd, pronounced [ˈɲaːrɒʒd]) is a village and municipality in the Dunajská Streda District in the Trnava Region of south-west Slovakia.

== History ==
The village was first recorded in 1113. Local tradition holds that the Mikóczy, Csölle, Nagy, Szalay, Várady, Tóth és Szabó families, millers and fishermen for profession, were the first settlers in the village.

During the Hungarian Revolution and Independence War of 1848-49, a battle took place near the village on 13 January 1849 between the Hungarian troops belonging to the Komárom fortress led by colonel Ferdinand Querlonde and the Austrian imperial troops led by lieutenant colonel Geramb who lost his life in the battle which helped the Hungarians to gain victory.

Until the end of World War I, it was part of Hungary and fell within the Dunaszerdahely district of Pozsony County. After the Austro-Hungarian army disintegrated in November 1918, Czechoslovak troops occupied the area. After the Treaty of Trianon of 1920, the village became officially part of Czechoslovakia. In November 1938, the First Vienna Award granted the area to Hungary and it was held by Hungary until 1945. The villages of Felsőnyárasd and Alsónyárasd were unified to form the present-day municipality in 1940. After Soviet occupation in 1945, Czechoslovak administration returned and the village became officially part of Czechoslovakia in 1947. Its original Slovak name derived from the Hungarian form as Náražd, but it was Slovakised by the authorities to the current official name in 1948.

== Population ==
Population statistic (10 years)
Year	1995	2005	2015	2025
Count	2992	2994	3018	3102
Difference		+0.06%	+0.80%	+2.78%

Population statistic
Year	2024	2025
Count	3122	3102
Difference		−0.64%

It has a population of 3102 people (31 December 2025).

=== Ethnicity ===
Census 2021 (1+ %)
Ethnicity	Number	Fraction
Hungarian	2744	88.06%
Slovak	369	11.84%
Not found out	151	4.84%
Total	3116	

In year 2021 was 3116 people by ethnicity 2744 as Hungarian, 369 as Slovak, 151 as Not found out, 12 as Romani, 7 as German, 6 as Czech, 2 as Ukrainian, 2 as Rusyn and 2 as Polish.

Note on population: The difference values of population numbers in the table "Population statistic" and in the sections "Ethnicity" & "Religion" is caused by the use of various statistical methods.

=== Religion ===
Census 2021 (1+ %)
Religion	Number	Fraction
Roman Catholic Church	2160	69.32%
None	636	20.41%
Not found out	113	3.63%
Calvinist Church	112	3.59%
Total	3116	

In year 2021 was 3116 people by religion 2160 from Roman Catholic Church, 636 from None, 113 from Not found out, 112 from Calvinist Church, 30 from Christian Congregations in Slovakia, 21 from Evangelical Church, 16 from Greek Catholic Church, 7 from Other, 6 from Other and not ascertained christian church, 4 from Old Catholic Church, 4 from Jehovah's Witnesses, 3 from Ad hoc movements, 2 from Eastern Orthodox Church and 2 from Buddhism.

== Geography ==
The municipality lies at an altitude of 111 metres (364 ft) and covers an area of 34.81 km^{2} (13.44 sq mi) (2025).
