= Kálmán Thaly =

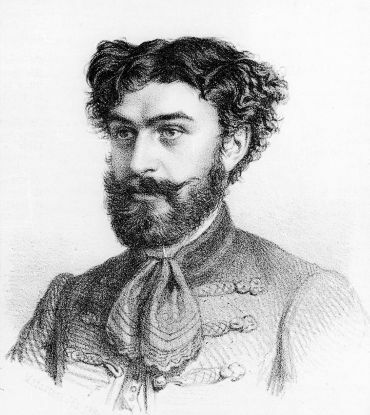
A sketch of Thaly as a young man.

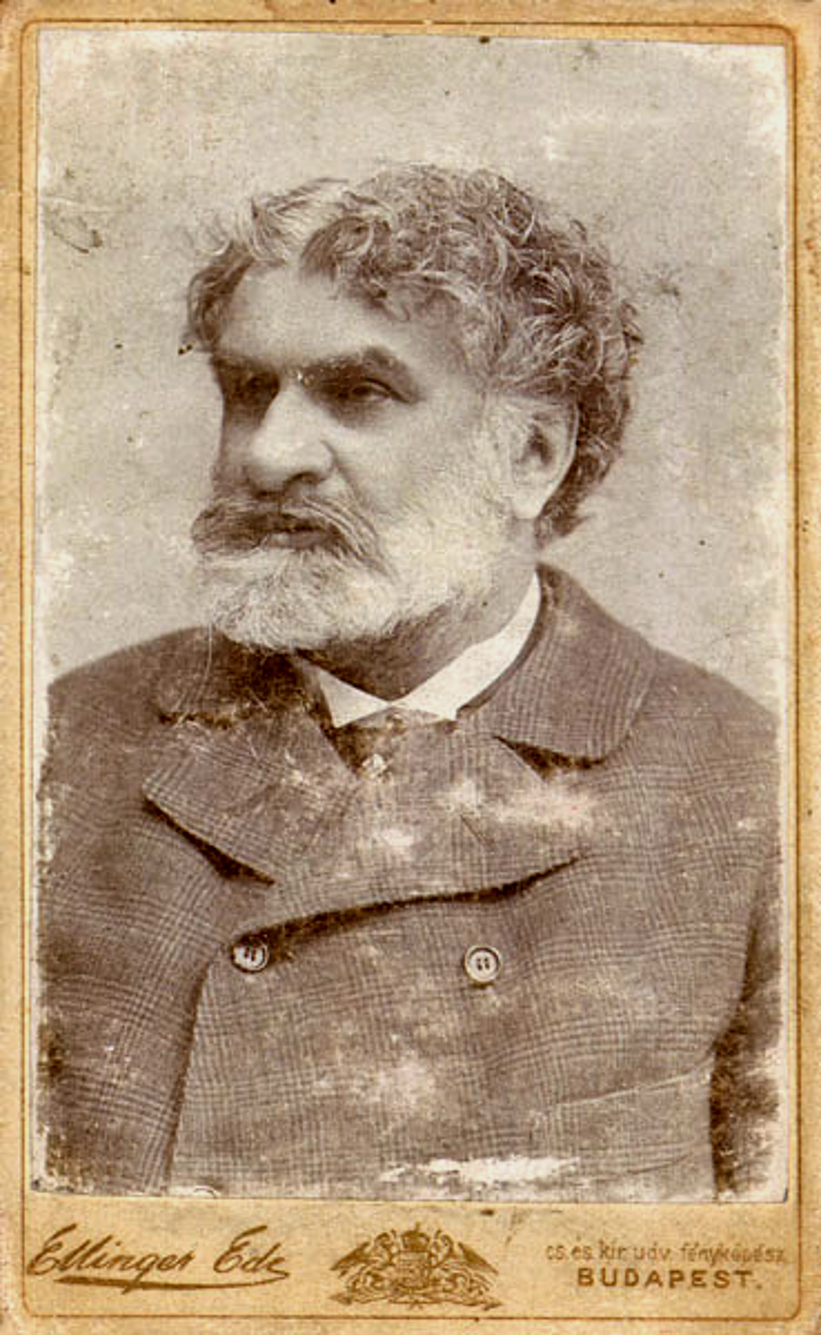
Kálmán Thaly

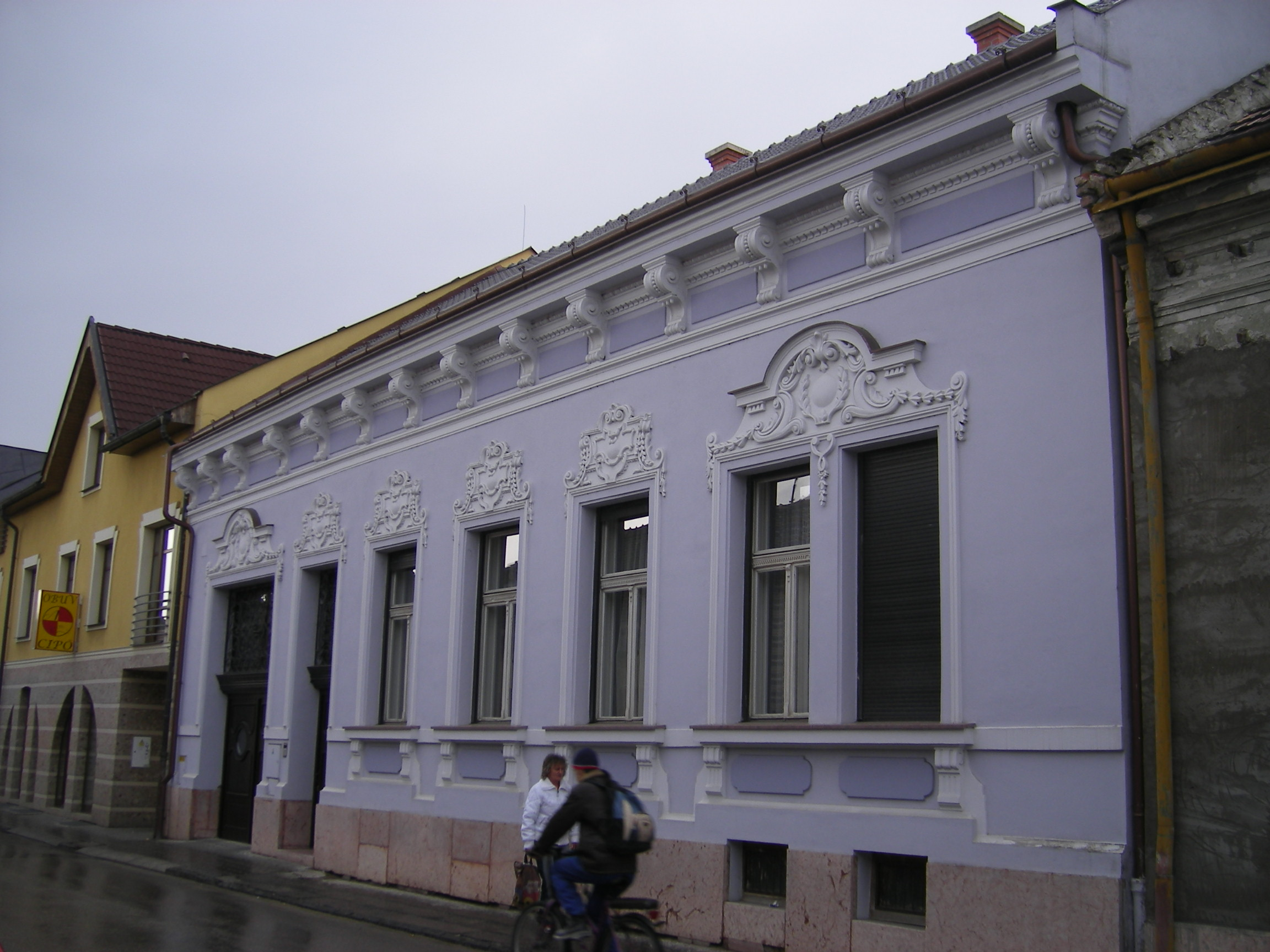
Kálmán Thaly's house

Kálmán Thaly (3 January 1839, Csép – 26 September 1909, Zablát) was a Hungarian poet, historian and politician. His most important works are his Kuruc poetry, the most famous literary forgery in the history of Hungarian literature.

== Work ==
Thaly started out as a poet. His poem collections, which appeared between 1857 and 1861, are tinged with a nationalistic fervor. They include Do not hurt the Hungarians (1857), Zengo Park (1859), Carpathian Horn (1860), Szekely Horn (1861), and Dawn of Freedom (1861). Later Thaly was increasingly attracted to history.

== Political career ==
Besides being a poet, Thaly was also a parliamentarian. He was also a member of the Hungarian Academy of Sciences. He held an influential place in the country's military affairs. He was instrumental in the founding of the Historical Society, and edited its journal.

== Patriotic Spirit ==
Thaly was highly patriotic. As a Hungarian national, he supported Francis II Rákóczi. In 1873, Thaly started a movement to exhume the grave of Rákóczi, and bring home his remains. Thaly dream was realized only in October 1906, when the remains of his hero were brought home to Hungary.

== Works ==
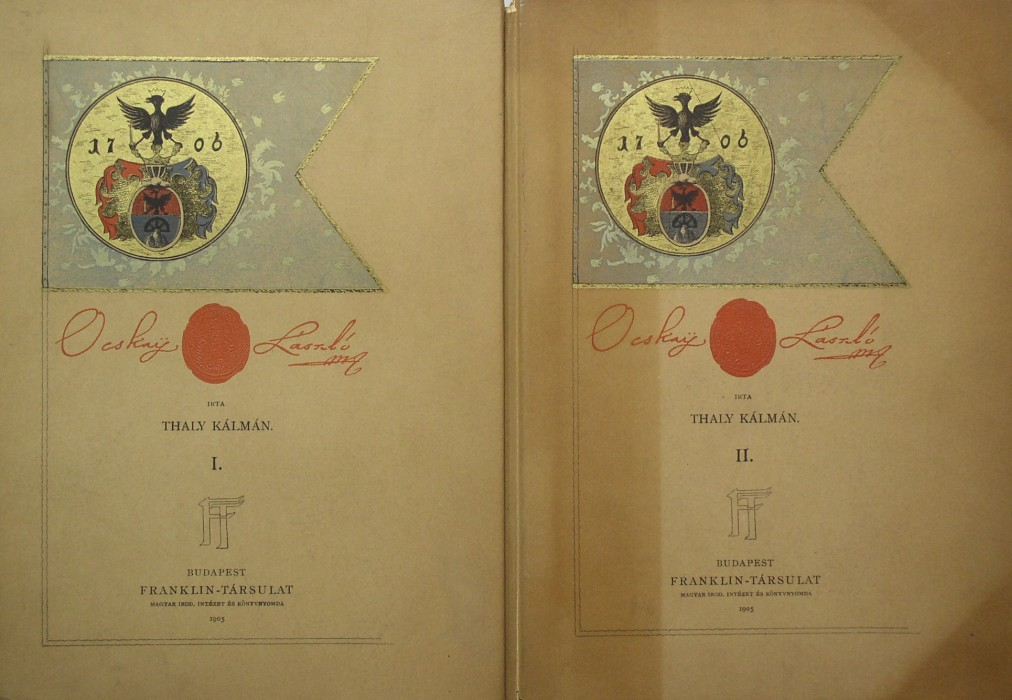
The cover of a book by Thaly.

Thaly's intense patriotism came through in his books. He wrote five books during his life, all of which bear an unmistakable mark of nationalism.
