= Nové Zámky 16th electoral district (Czechoslovakia) =

XVI. Electoral District
County	Municipalities
Bratislava	Bratislava City, Bystrica, Devín, Devínska Nová Ves, Dúbravka, Farna, Hochštetno, Horvátský Grob, Ivánka, Karlova Ves, Lamač, Mariatál, Mást, Oberufer, Pajštún, Petržalka, Stupava, Vajnory, Zohor
Dunajská Streda	entire county
Galanta	all areas not included in the Trnava 15th electoral district
Komárno	entire county
Malacky	entire county
Modra	Nemecký Grob, Slovenský Grob, Švansbach
Šaľa	Diakovce, Dlhá nad Váhom, Farkašd, Králová, Kráľová nad Váhom, Neded, Pered, Selice, Šala nad Váhom, Šok, Tornok, Veča, Žigard
Šamorín	entire county
Nitra	Badice, Branč, Čehynce, Čitáry, Gest, Hrnčiarovce, Jagersek, Lajošová, Mechenice, Nitra, Pogranice, Velký Cetín, Vyčapy-Opatovce
Nové Zámky	Andod, Nové Zámky, Tardošked, Veliký Kýr
Parkáň	entire county
Stará Ďala	all areas not included in the Báňská Bystrica 18th electoral district
Vráble	Babindol, Baračka, Beša, Bešeňov, Čifáry, Dyčka, Dedinka (Fajkurt), Horný Ohaj, Horný Pial, Iňa, Lula, Mochovce, Pozba, Tehla, Teldince, Velké Hyndice
Zlaté Moravce	Dýmeš, Koleňany, Ladice, Žirany
Krupina	Dolné Semerovce, Fedýmeš, Hokovce, Horné Semerovce, Horné Turovce, Horváty, Hrkovce, Inam, Kleňany, Malé Turovce, Nekyje, Pereslany, Plášťovce, Sazdice, Sečenka, Slatina, Stredné Turovce, Šahy, Tešmák, Tompa, Velká Ves, Vyška
Levice	Bor, Dolná Seč, Horná Seč, Levice, Lok, Ludany, Malá Kálnica, Malé Kosmalovce, Malý Kiar, Marušová, Naďod, Nový Tekov, Ovárky, Varšavy, Velká Kálnica
Modrý Kameň	Balog, Bátorová, Čebovce, Ďurkovce, Chrástince, Ipolské Kosihy, Kamenné Kosihy, Koláry, Kosihovce, Lesenice, Malá Čalomija, Nanince, Opatovce, Selany, Slovenské Ďarmoty, Širákov, Trebušovce, Velká Čalomija
Želiezovce	entire county
*As per the revision of constituencies made in 1925.

The Nové Zámky 16th electoral district ('XVI. Nové Zámky') was a parliamentary constituency in the First Czechoslovak Republic for elections to the Chamber of Deputies. The seat of the District Electoral Commission was in the town of Nové Zámky. The constituency elected 11 members of the Chamber of Deputies.

== Demographics ==
The boundaries of the Nové Zámky 16th electoral district and the Kosice 20th electoral district had been drawn to maximize the number of Hungarian and German voters in these districts. 96% of all Hungarians and 59% of all Germans in Slovakia lived in these two electoral districts. In Nové Zámky 16th electoral district 36% of the inhabitants were ethnic Czechoslovaks.

The 1921 Czechoslovak census estimated that the Nové Zámky 16th electoral district had 629,458 inhabitants. Thus there was one Chamber of Deputies member for each 57,223 inhabitants, far more than the national average of 45,319 inhabitants per seat. The Košice 20th electoral district had 57,238 inhabitants per seat. Only the Užhorod 23rd electoral district (i.e. Subcarpathian Rus') had a higher amount of inhabitants per seat that the Nové Zámky and Košice districts in all of Czechoslovakia. As of the 1930 census Nove Zámky 16th electoral district had the second-highest number of inhabitants per seat (64,273/seat), after Užhorod.

== Senate elections ==
In election to the Senate Nové Zamky 16th electoral district and Košice 20th electoral district together formed the Nové Zámky 9th senatorial electoral district (which elected 9 senators), in spite of the fact that the two electoral districts were geographically separated.

== 1920 election ==
In the 1920 Czechoslovak parliamentary election the majority of votes in Nové Zámky were cast for social democrats and the Hungarian-German Social Democratic Party emerged as the largest party. With 35.7% of the votes it got 4 deputies elected (Paul Wittich, Samuel Mayer, Gyula Nagy and Jozsef Földessy). Also in the fray was the Czechoslovak Social Democratic Workers Party which obtained 15.3% of the vote and got a deputy elected (Ivan Dérer). The social democrats mobilized voters both in industrial centres (like Bratislava) as well as amongst agricultural labourers in the country-side.

The second largest party in the district was the Hungarian-German Christian Social Party, which polled 24.5% of the votes. János Tobler and Johann Jabloniczky were two of their deputies.

== 1929 election ==
Party	Votes	%
Provincial Christian-Socialist Party	119,987	37.64
Communist Party of Czechoslovakia	53,702	16.84
Republican Party of Agrarian and Smallholding Peoples	33,687	10.57
Czechoslovak Social Democratic Workers Party	31,093	9.75
Hlinka's Slovak People's Party	29,475	9.25
Czechoslovak National Socialist Party	12,140	3.81
Czechoslovak Traders' Party	8,569	2.69
United Jewish and Polish Parties	7,480	2.35
Provincial Party of Smallholders, Entrepreneurs and Workers	5,733	1.80
German Electoral Coalition	4,268	1.34
Czechoslovak National Democracy	4,002	1.26
German Social Democratic Workers Party	3,813	1.20
Czechoslovak People's Party	2,065	0.65
Juriga's Slovak People's Party	1,952	0.61
League Against Bound Tickets	843	0.26
Total	318,809	100

The percentage achieved by the Communist Party in the district was the highest in the country in the 1929 vote.
