= Battle of Zsigárd =

Battle of the Hungarian War of Independence

Coordinates: 48°04′34.8″N 17°52′59.3″E

- Part of the Hungarian Revolution of 1848
Date	16 June 1849
Location	Zsigárd, Kingdom of Hungary
Result	Austrian victory

Belligerents
Hungarian Revolutionary Army	Austrian Empire

Commanders and leaders
Lajos Asbóth	Anton von Herzinger

Strength
Total: 8,547; 51 cannons	Total: 7,719; 27 cannons

Casualties and losses
At Zsigárd: 200–250 soldiers, 11–14 officers many horses 3 cannons 3 ammunition vaggons On the other theatres: 185 dead, wounded and missing, 4 cannons	At Zsigárd: 206 soldiers, 5 officers 50 horses 3 cannons 1 ammunition vaggon On the other theatres: 62 dead, wounded and missing

The Battle of Zsigárd, fought on 16 June 1849, was one of the battles which took place in the Summer Campaign of the Hungarian War of Independence from 1848 to 1849, fought between the Hungarian Revolutionary Army and the Habsburg Empire. On 16. June 1849 the Hungarian II. corps under the leadership of Colonel Lajos Asbóth occupied Zsigárd, Királyrév, Negyed and Farkasd, but in the end, the counterattack of the Austrian Theissing and Pott brigades under the leadership of Major General Anton Freiherr von Herzinger forced it to retreat on its starting position. The only success of the Hungarians in this battle was that the II. corps built a bridge at Negyed, which they managed to hold, against the Austrian attacks.

== Background ==
After the victory in the Battle of Csorna the Hungarians continued their advance west on the right bank of the Danube. A detachment of General Ernő Poeltenberg chased out the Austrian units from Öttevény, then a detachment of the VII. corps captured Kóny. With these successes the Hungarian commanders hoped that the Austrians will be forced to send reinforcements from the left bank of the Danube to the right, weakening their defenses on the region of the Vág river, increasing in this way the chances of success of the planned Hungarian offensive alongside this river. The new commander of the Austrian troops, Field Marshal Julius Jacob von Haynau started indeed to send his troops on the right bank of the Danube, but not with the purpose of defense, but to start an offensive.

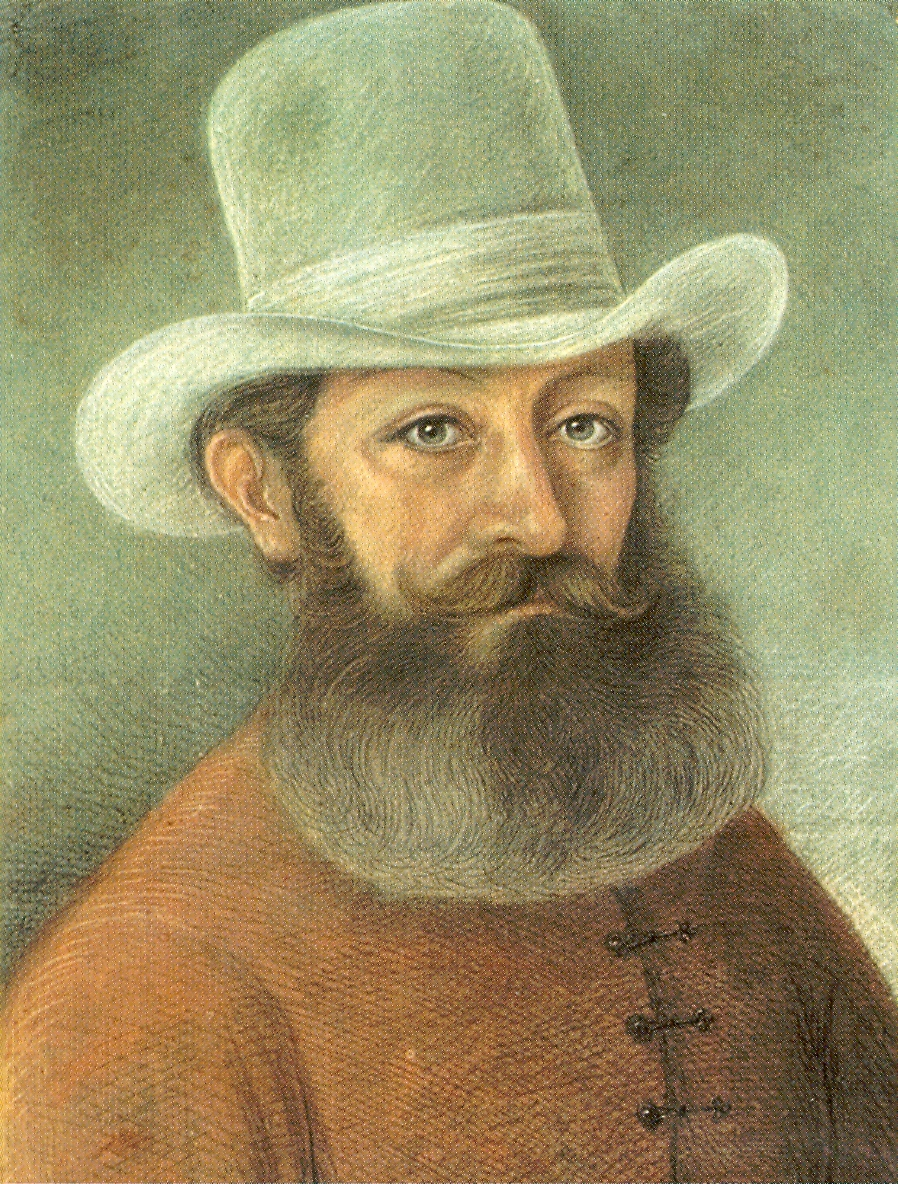
Lajos Asbóth

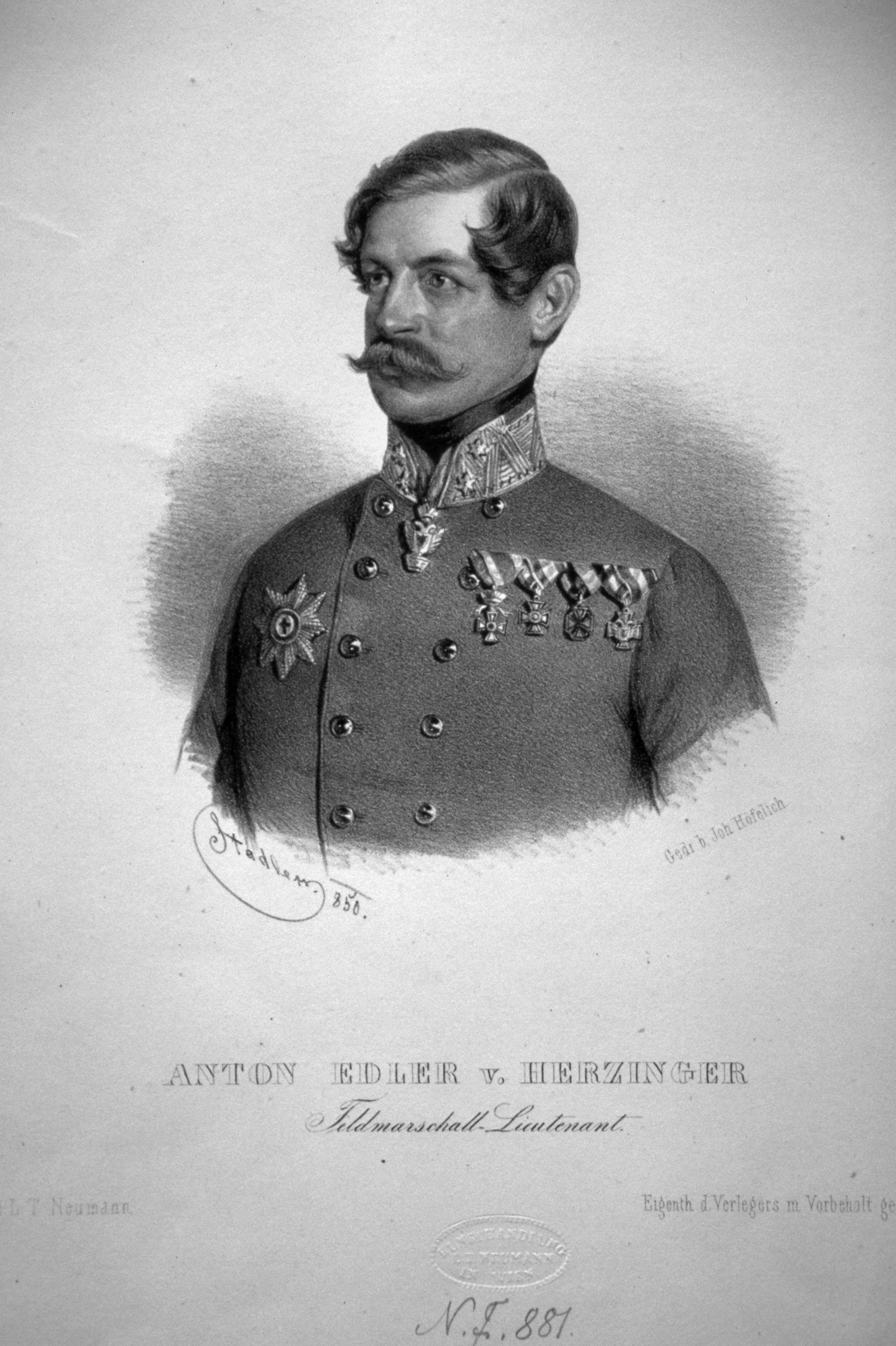
Anton von Herzinger Litho

The positive start of the Summer Campaign was not followed by similar successes. This had both personal and strategic causes. On the other hand, in the leadership of the Hungarian army occurred some strategic and personal negative changes. In the last phase and after the Spring Campaign and the Siege of Buda many talented and successful corps commanders were changed by generals, who, despite being good division and brigade leaders, as corps commanders, later they fell short of expectations: the commander of the I. corps Major General György Klapka was replaced by Major General József Nagysándor, the commander of the III. corps, General János Damjanich was replaced by Major General Károly Knezić, the new commanders lacking tactical courage and initiative. In the leadership of the II. corps the good strategist and proactive General Lajos Aulich was replaced by the courageous, but not a very good tactician Colonel Lajos Asbóth, while in the leadership of the VII. corps General András Gáspár was replaced by Colonel Ernő Poeltenberg, who was the only good replacement among the corps commanders. The Hungarian main commander, General Artúr Görgei himself, because was appointed war minister, could not lead personally the military operations, and the Central Operational Bureau (Központi Hadműveleti Iroda), which had to assume the coordination of the Hungarian military units, could not effectively resolve the problems occurred during the campaign because of the too wide operational area. Meantime the Hungarian intelligence had no idea about the size, distribution, and centers of gravity of the enemy units. Besides the strategical intelligence, also the tactical intelligence of the corps was insufficient. Another problem was that the hope of creating local superiority, in certain points of the front, was lost because of the defeat in the Battle of Káty of General Mór Perczel, which prevented him to send in support Hungarian troops from southern Hungary, as the initial operational plan stated. Also the cholera epidemic, which broke out in the autumn of 1848, and other diseases too, decimated the troops.

== Prelude ==
Görgei and his chief of staff Lieutenant-Colonel József Bayer planned an offensive on the left bank of the Danube. Although in that region the terrain was rugged, which could make the advance slower, but also made it more difficult for the Austrians to implement their numerical superiority. And with this attack on the left bank of the Danube, they hoped to force the enemy to retreat from the right bank and reinforce their troops from the left bank. This stratagem was quite complicated and necessitated very close cooperation between the corps and detachments of the Hungarian army.

The plan was to attack along the Vág river, on a terrain fragmented with hills, woods, rivers, and marshes, which did not make possible a quick advancement of the Hungarians, but prevented the enemy to use its numerical superiority, hoping also to force the Austrian troops south to the Danube, to stop their attack there towards Győr and Komárom.

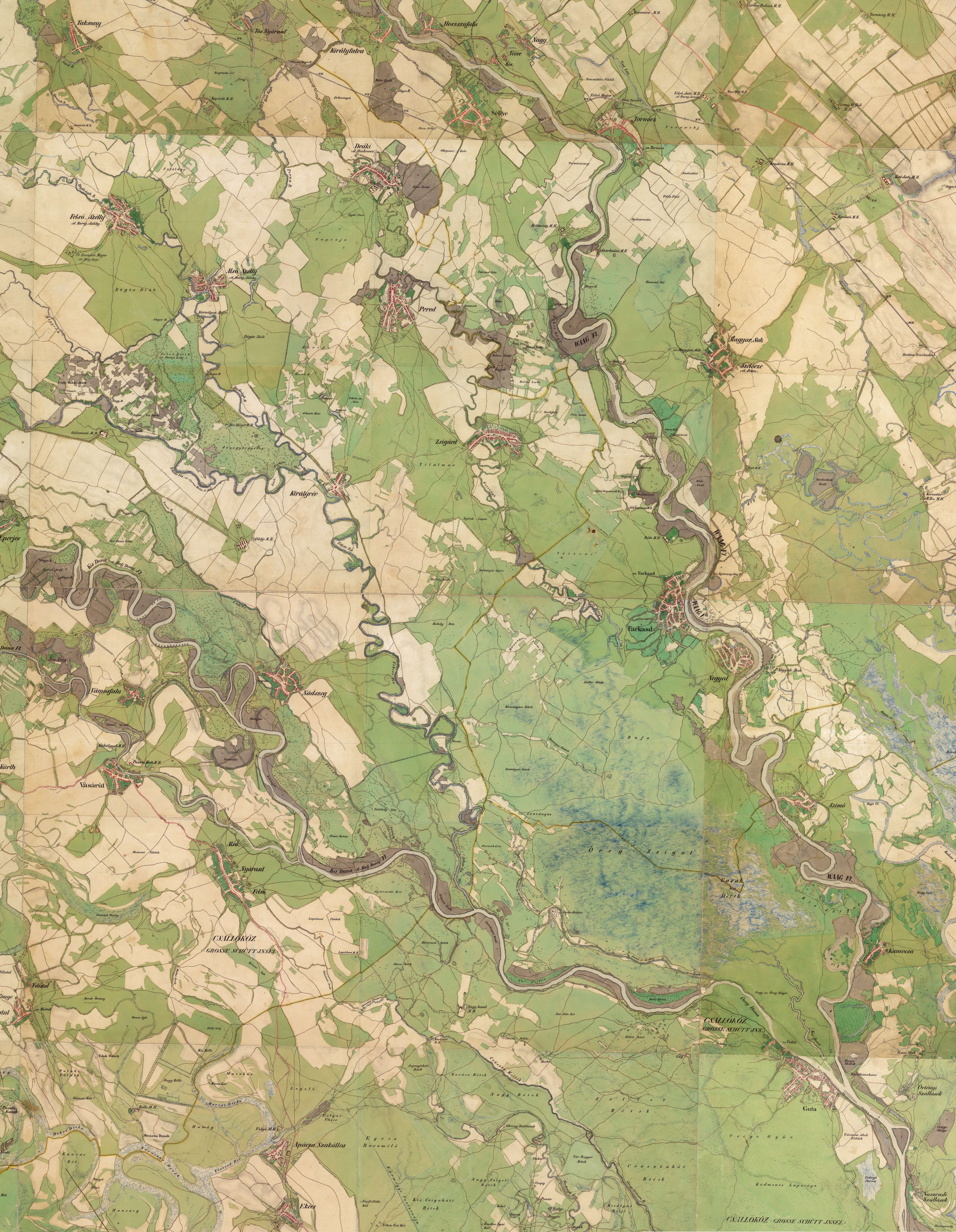
Map of the region in which the Battles of Zsigárd and Pered took place

First the II. corps had to start the attack, crossing the Little Danube at Guta, and after leaving a small bridge guard unit, on 16 June in the morning, after crossing the Danube's Érsekújvár branch, to attack the right flank of the Austrian positions. They had to leave a brigade at Aszódpuszta, which, together with a part of the Kosztolányi division, had to protect the crossing point against the Austrian attacks. After the II. corps reached Vágfarkasd and Negyed, they had to build in both villages bridges across the Vág. Meanwhile, the III. corps, which after sending forward, at 6:00 a.m., its vanguard from Tardoskedd and Tótmegyer to Vágsellye, with the intention of diverting the attention of the Austrians, had to advance from Érsekújvár, through Szemő, to Vágfarkasd. Here, the III. and the II. corps had to obtain a victory against the Austrian troops, then cross the Vág together. Meanwhile, the I. corps had to concentrate at Mocsonok, sending its vanguards to Sempte and Vághosszúfalu, where they had to distract the Austrians' attention. After the two corps joined on the right bank of the Vág river, they had to advance, between the Vág and the Érsekújvár branch of the Danube, through Királyrév towards Diószeg, in order to enable the I. corps to cross the Vág at Szered, and to capture the entire line of the river. At the same time, the Kosztolányi division had to carry out a series of attacks in Csallóköz, to divert the Austrians' attention from the main Hungarian attack.

This plan had many problems. The officers from the Central Operational Bureau which elaborated it, were not aware of the fact that between the Vág and the Little Danube, the terrain is very marshy, and because of this only the ramparts could be used to go from one village to another. This made the task of the attacking army almost impossible to fulfill. The other problem of the plan was that it put all the responsibility for the success of the military actions on the II. corps "shoulders", because in the case of an unsuccessful attack of them against Királyrév and Zsigárd condemned the III. corps to inactivity. Another problem was that the commanders of the three corps which had to be involved in this offensive had to operate on their own, far from each other, and Görgei, who was supposed to coordinate them, could not be there, because he was in Pest, fulfilling his ministerial duties.

On 11 June Asbóth shipped the Szekulits division over the Vág, and occupied Aszódpuszta. From here the Kisfaludy brigade of the division crossed the Érsekújvár branch of the Danube, occupying Seregakol, in order to cover the bridge-building from Aszódpuszta. On 13 June the Hungarian troops from Aszódpuszta and Seregakol were attacked by Austrian scouting units, but they easily repulsed them. On that evening the bridge from Aszódpuszta was finished. On 14 June Asbóth sent the Csúzy brigade reinforced, probably by cavalry, on reconnaissance by combat towards Vásárút, which was occupied from the Derschatta detachment of the Austrian II. corps Reischach brigade, but when the Austrians received reinforcements, and the Hungarians retreated to Aszódpuszta. On 15 June in the late afternoon, Asbóth concentrated his troops at Aszódpuszta. He planned a bidirectional attack. For this, that night, a detachment crossed to the northern shore of the Danube at Gúta, in order to advance on the causeway, occupy Negyed and Vágfarkasd, and start to build a bridge for the III. corps, then to support the attack, towards Zsigárd, of the main column of the II. corps, led by Asbóth. Asbóth himself intended to advance from Aszódpuszta through Királyrév, sending a strong detachment on the right bank of the Dudvág towards Királyrév, to cover his left wing. For the protection of the bridge from Aszódpuszta he left behind the Csúzy brigade, reinforced with mainly artillery pieces, but also with some cavalry units.

From the Austrian side, the region from Pozsonyeperjes, through the confluence of Danube and Vág, until Királyfalva was defended by the Pott brigade. According to the Hungarian scouting from 14 June, the Austrian brigade was not enough for the large area that it had to defend, and a Hungarian attack could achieve success in that direction. Meanwhile, the Austrians too observed the Hungarian movements in that direction and started to reinforce the Pott brigade. On 15 June the 1. battalion of the 10. (Mazzuchelli) infantry regiment and half of the 3. infantry battery arrived from Csallóköz, and on the same day the 3. battalion of the 40. (Koudelka) infantry regiment departed towards Zsigárd. On 14. June Pott asked for help from the IV. (Reserve) corps, and its commander Lieutenant General Ludwig von Wohlgemuth, sent a part of the Theissing brigade (2 grenadier battalions, 3 companies of the Auersperg cuirassier regiment, and 2 batteries) from Nagyszombat, under Major General Anton von Herzinger, towards Zsigárd.

=== Opposing forces ===
The Hungarian army

II. corps;
Commander Colonel Lajos Asbóth.

4. (Mándy) division;
- 1. (Szabó) brigade:

- 48. Honvéd battalion (6 companies: 645 soldiers, 6 horses),
- Bocskai (2.52) Honvéd battalion (3 companies: 461 soldiers, 5 horses),
- Bereg volunteer company (1 company: 136 soldiers, 1 horse),
- Pozsony jäger company (1 company: 108 soldiers),
- 3. sapper battalion (12. and 17. Bánság companies: 229 soldiers, 1 horse),
- Colonel division (?) of the 6. (Württemberg) Hussar regiment (2 companies: 226 soldiers, 243 horses),
- 1. three-pounder infantry battery (142 soldiers, 95 horses, 7 cannons),
- 2. cavalry battery (108 soldiers, 93 horses, 5 cannons).

2,055 soldiers, 443 horses, 12 cannons;

- 2. (Collig) brigade:

- 25. Honvéd battalion (6 companies: 595 soldiers, 7 horses),
- 1. battalion of the 39. (Dom Miguel) infantry regiment (6 companies: 404 soldiers, 3 horses),
- 54. Honvéd battalion (6 companies: 683 soldiers, 2 horses),
- Lieutenant colonel and 2. Major division (?) of the 6. (Württemberg) Hussar regiment (4 companies: 454 soldiers, 487 horses),
- 1. six-pounder infantry battery (164 soldiers, 118 horses, 8 cannons),
- 2. twelve-pounder battery (92 soldiers, 72 horses, 8 cannons),

2,392 soldiers, 689 horses, 16 cannons;

5. (Szekulits) division;
- 1. (Csúzy) brigade:

- 61. Honvéd battalion (6 companies: 722 soldiers, 24 horses),
- 63. Honvéd battalion (6 companies: 536 soldiers, 17 horses),
- 49. Honvéd battalion (4 companies: 526 soldiers, 19 horses),
- 2. three-pounder infantry battery (139 soldiers, 94 horses, 7 cannons),
- 6. six-pounder infantry battery (144 soldiers, 116 horses, 8 cannons),

2,067 soldiers, 270 horses, 15 cannons;

- 2. (Kisfaludy) brigade:

- 56. Honvéd battalion (6 companies: 793 soldiers, 31 horses),
- 60. Honvéd battalion (6 companies: 761 soldiers, 13 horses),
- 1. Major division of the 17. (Bocskai) Hussar regiment (4 companies: 454 soldiers, 487 horses),
- Cuman volunteer cavalry company (1 company: 80 soldiers, 80 horses),
- 5. six-pounder infantry battery (159 soldiers, 114 horses, 8 cannons),

2,033 soldiers, 483 horses, 8 cannons;

Total: 8,547 soldiers, 1,885 horses, 51 cannons.

The Austrian army,
Commander Major General Anton Freiherr von Herzinger: IV. (Reserve) k.u.k. corps, division commander

- Pott brigade:

- 2. kaiserjäger battalion (4 companies: c.586 soldiers),
- 1. battalion of the 10. (Mazzuchelli) line infantry regiment (6 companies: c.692 soldiers),
- 3. battalion of the 40. (Koudelka) line infantry regiment (5 companies: c.681 soldiers),
- 3. battalion of the 56. (Fürstenwärther) line infantry regiment (6 companies: c.717 soldiers),
- 3. battalion of the 57. (Haynau) line infantry regiment (3 companies: c.506 soldiers),
- 1. Landwehr battalion of the 58. (Archduke Stephen) line infantry regiment (6 companies: c.743 soldiers),
- 3. sapper battalion (¼ company: c.31 soldiers),
- 1. colonel company of the 5. (Liechtenstein) Chevau-léger regiment (1 company: c.132 soldiers, c.117 horses),
- 11. six-pounder infantry battery (c.91 soldiers, c.94 horses, 6 cannons),
- 3. six-pounder infantry ½ battery (c.47 soldiers, c.36 horses, 3 cannons),
- 15. Congreve rocket battery (c.90 soldiers, c.83 horses, 6 rocket launching racks),

c.4,316 soldiers, c.314 horses, 9 cannons, 6 rocket launching racks;

- Theissing brigade:

- Schneider grenadier battalion (6 companies: c.784 soldiers),
- Richter grenadier battalion (6 companies: c.733 soldiers),
- Fischer grenadier battalion (4 companies: c.584 soldiers),
- Bittermann grenadier battalion (4 companies: c.362 soldiers),
- 5. (Auersperg) cuirassier regiment (6 companies: c.710 soldiers, 736 horses),
- 19. six-pounder infantry battery (c.110 soldiers, c.76 horses, 6 cannons),
- 2. cavalry battery (c.120 soldiers, c.118 horses, 6 cannons),

c.3,403 soldiers, c.930 horses, 12 cannons;

Total: c.7,719 soldiers, c.1,244 horses, 27 cannons. (Note: The number of the Austrian units are shown with the circa sign because the account about their number was made on 20 July, four days after the battle.)

== Battle ==
On 16 June, at 6:30 a.m., the II. corps commanded by Colonel Lajos Asbóth started their attack. On the right flank of the II. corps the Rakovzsky detachment (composed of the 48. Honvéd battalion, a half company of the Württemberg hussar regiment, half of a three-pounder battery, and a sapper company; in total 880 soldiers and 3 cannons) (Note: According to József Bánlaky, Rakovszky had not 1 but 3 sapper companies, and not a ½ but 1 ½ battery.) occupied Negyed without any resistance, because the 2. k.u.k. kaiserjäger battalion which defended this locality and Farkasd, retreated from both villages. After this the Hungarian sappers started to gather wood, to build a bridge.

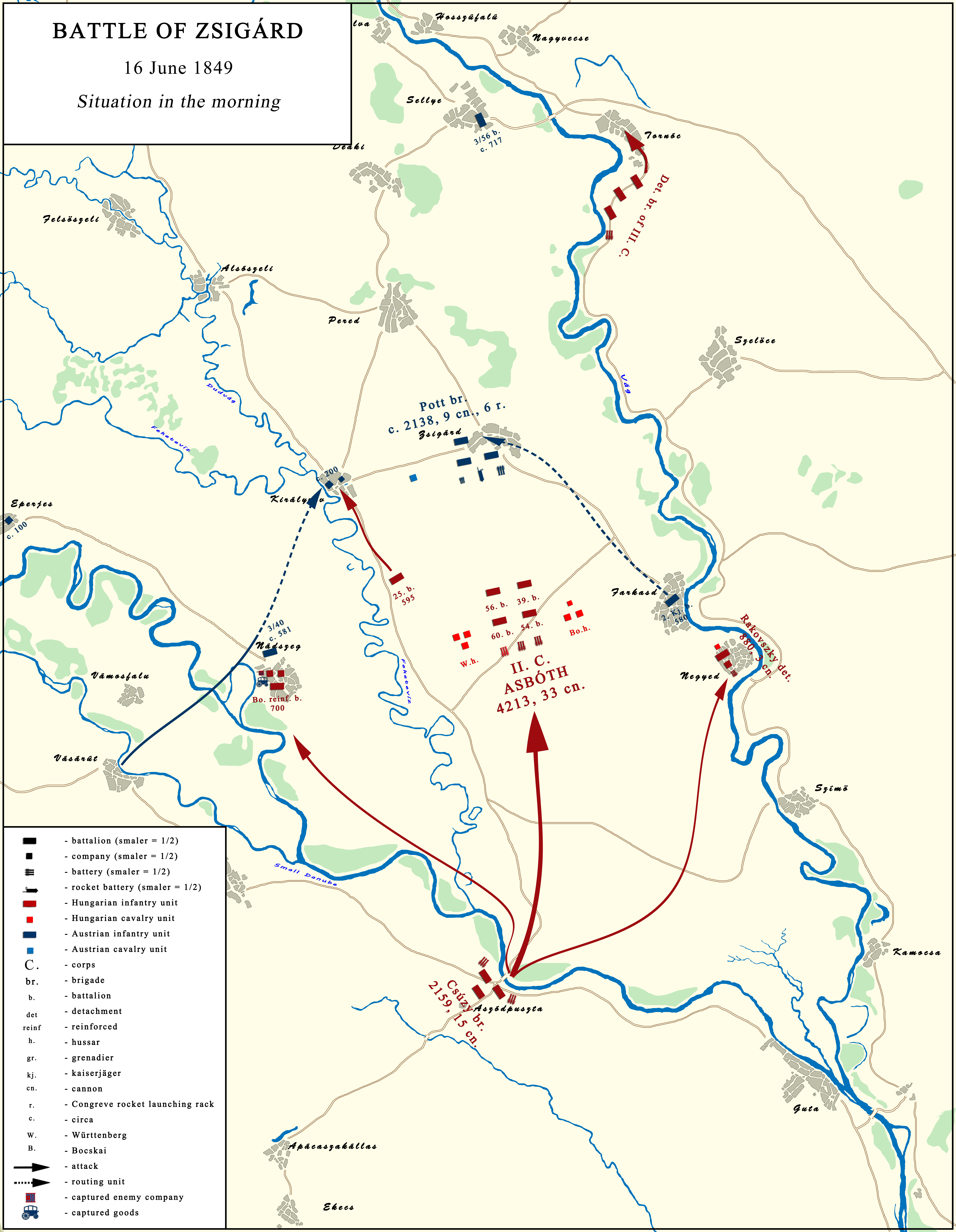
Battle of Zsigárd. Situation until 11 a.m

On the left flank the reinforced Bocskai battalion (the Bocskai battalion, the Bereg volunteers company, the Pozsony jägers company; in a total of 700 soldiers), advancing along the Dudvág (Feketevíz), reached from behind and captured the k.u.k. 3/40 line battalions luggage, which was heading to Zsigárd, at Nádszeg, together with the soldiers which accompanied it. Around 7:00 a.m., the reinforced Bocskai battalion attacked the 1 company strong Austrian unit, which soon received assistance, from the direction of Vásárút, the 3. battalion of the Austrian 40. (Koudelka) infantry regiment led by Major Friedrich Ritter von Grobois. The Hungarians attacked the Austrians, who wanted to retreat towards Vásárút, but after their route was cut off, they headed towards Királyrév. In this fight the Austrians lost 22 soldiers, while the Hungarians only 1. The retreating Austrian battalion in question tried its best to be as quick as it was possible, but the 25. Honvéd battalion, sent by Asbóth, under the lead of Captain Rezsni, reached Királyrév before them and occupied it with assault around 11:00 a.m. from 1 ½ company of the 3/57 k.u.k. line battalion. Their goal was to join here with the detachment coming from the direction of Nádszeg. The Austrian garrison of Királyrév retreated to the right bank of the Dudvág. At this moment the 3/40 line battalion led by Major Grobois arrived at Királyrév, and with a fierce attack over the bridge of the Dudvág, pushed back the vanguards of the 25. battalion. But around noon Rezsni started a counter-attack, and with the help of the Bocskai detachment, they caught Grobois between two fires, forcing him to retreat westwards, towards Tallós. (Note: According to József Bánlaky, Grobois joined the Pott brigade at Zsigárd.) After that Asbóth ordered the 25. battalion to march to Zsigárd, to reinforce his defence here.

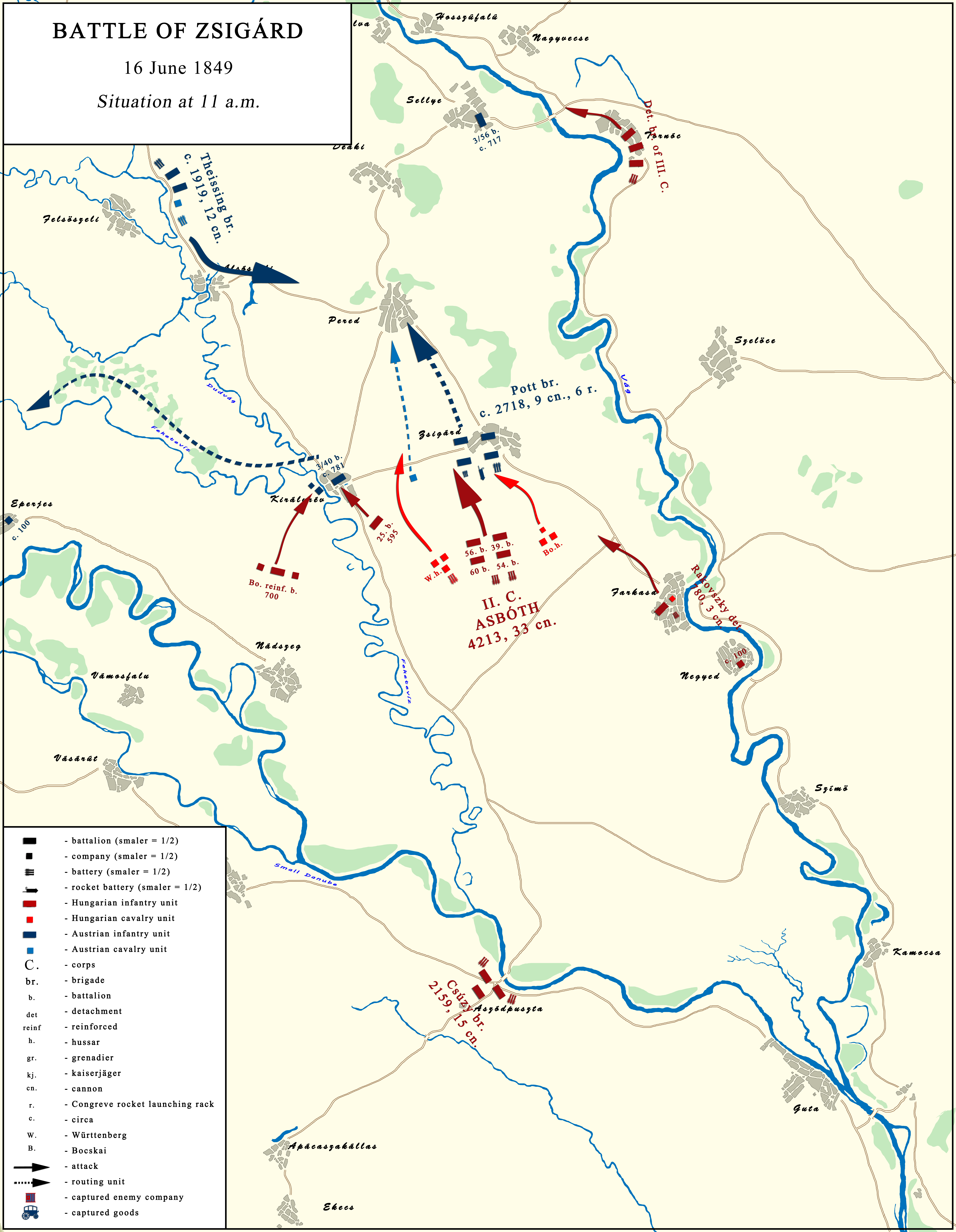
Battle of Zsigárd. Situation at 11 a.m

The Hungarian main column led by Colonel Lajos Asbóth arrived in the vicinity of Zsigárd around 10:30 a.m., where they took the battle position. The commander of the II. corps' main column was composed of the 1. battalion of the 39. (Dom Miguel) infantry regiment, the 25., 54., 56. and 60. Honvéd battalions, 3 ½, and 2 companies of the 6. (Würtemberg), respective 17. (Bocskai) hussar regiments, the 1. and 5. six-pounder batteries, as well as the 2. cavalry battery; in total around 4,300 soldiers and 21 cannons. He placed the infantry in the center in two lines. The first line was led by Major Collig, and was formed by 1. the Dom Miguel, and the 56. battalions, while in the second line Major Kisfaludy was leading the 54. and 60. Honvéd battalions. The cavalry was divided a little behind the two wings: 3 companies of the Württemberg hussars on the right, and 1 company of Bocskai hussars on the left wing; while the artillery was deployed behind the troops.

On the Austrian side, Major General Gustav Ritter von Pott deployed his troops leaning his left wing on Zsigárd, fortified by an entrenchment. His infantry deployed in two lines, with the artillery in front of it, while the chevau-léger company protected the right flank. (Note: According to József Bánlaky, the Pott brigade had only 3 infantry battalions, 1 infantry, and 1 cavalry companies and 9 cannons, while Krisztián Kemény speaks about 6 battalions, 1 cavalry company, 1 sapper company, p cannons and rocket launching racks. Because Kemény's article is much newer than Bánlaky's work, we tend to accept the number given by him.)

The battle started around 11:00 a.m. with the shootings of the k.u.k. artillery. They tried to prevent the Hungarian Infantry's deployment, but when the twice numerous Magyar artillery started to shoot, the situation changed completely. The skillfully led Hungarian cannons blew up an enemy ammunition wagon, then caused immense damage both to the Austrian artillery and infantry. Profiting on this, Asbóth sent the 3 companies of Württemberg hussars and the cavalry battery from his left wing to encircle the enemy, and when Pott saw that the Austrian Liechtenstein chevau-légers were not able to prevent this, he ordered the retreat. But the Austrians encountered new problems when the Hungarian cavalry from the left flank, composed of a half company of the Württemberg hussars, supported by two companies of the 17. (Bocskai) hussar regiment broke into the entrenched position of the 11. k.u.k. half infantry battery in front of Zsigárd, capturing 3 cannons. Soon after this the 39/1. and the 54 Honvéd battalions stormed Zsigárd, defended by the 2. kaiserjäger battalion, which at this moment, was suddenly attacked also by the villagers, so they retreated with heavy losses. After this Pott pulled back his troops to Pered.

After this Asbóth contented himself with this success, stopped the pursuit of the retreating enemy, and for more than two hours confined himself, to the defense of Zsigárd, sending only recon patrols in the region. But if he would have pursued Pott's brigade, he could have easily capture Pered, then with his cavalry and artillery superiority, he could have crushed it before the arrival of the reinforcements led by Herzinger. Later Asbóth tried to explain himself with the need of his troops to rest, that he did not want to get too far from the bridge being built at Negyed, and that he wanted to wait for the arrival of the Rakovszky detachment. But Rakovszky's detachments' advancement was slowed by the narrowness of the causeway on which they marched, delaying their arrival. Expecting an Austrian counter-attack, Asbóth deployed his troops at Zsigárd. The reinforced Bocskai battalion (with the Bereg volunteers company, the Pozsony jägers company) was holding Királyrév, while the 39. (Dom Miguel) battalion defended Zsigárd. Between them the bulk of the II. corps took place, with the 24. and 54. battalions were on the left, while the 60. and 56. Honvéd battalions were on the right wing. The center was occupied by 1 cavalry and 2 infantry batteries, covered by 1 Bocskai and 3 Württemberg hussar companies.

Meanwhile, across the Dudvág (Feketevíz) the k.u.k. troops started to gather, then after the 15. Congreve rocket battery, accompanied by an uhlan patrol, arrived from the direction of Tallós and marched towards Királyrév. This Austrian detachment, under the lead of Major Friedrich Ritter von Grobois, was composed of 5 companies of the 3/40 battalion, 1 ½ company of the 3/57 battalion, the 15. Congreve rocket battery and 12 uhlans from the 1. (Civalart) uhlan regiment (total around 1050 soldiers and 6 rocket launching racks). Although they could not overpower the reinforced Bocskai battalion, which was holding this village, Asbóth, overestimating the threat, sent back the 25. Honvéd battalion with two cannons to reinforce the detachment from Királyrév, weakening his position from Zsigárd.

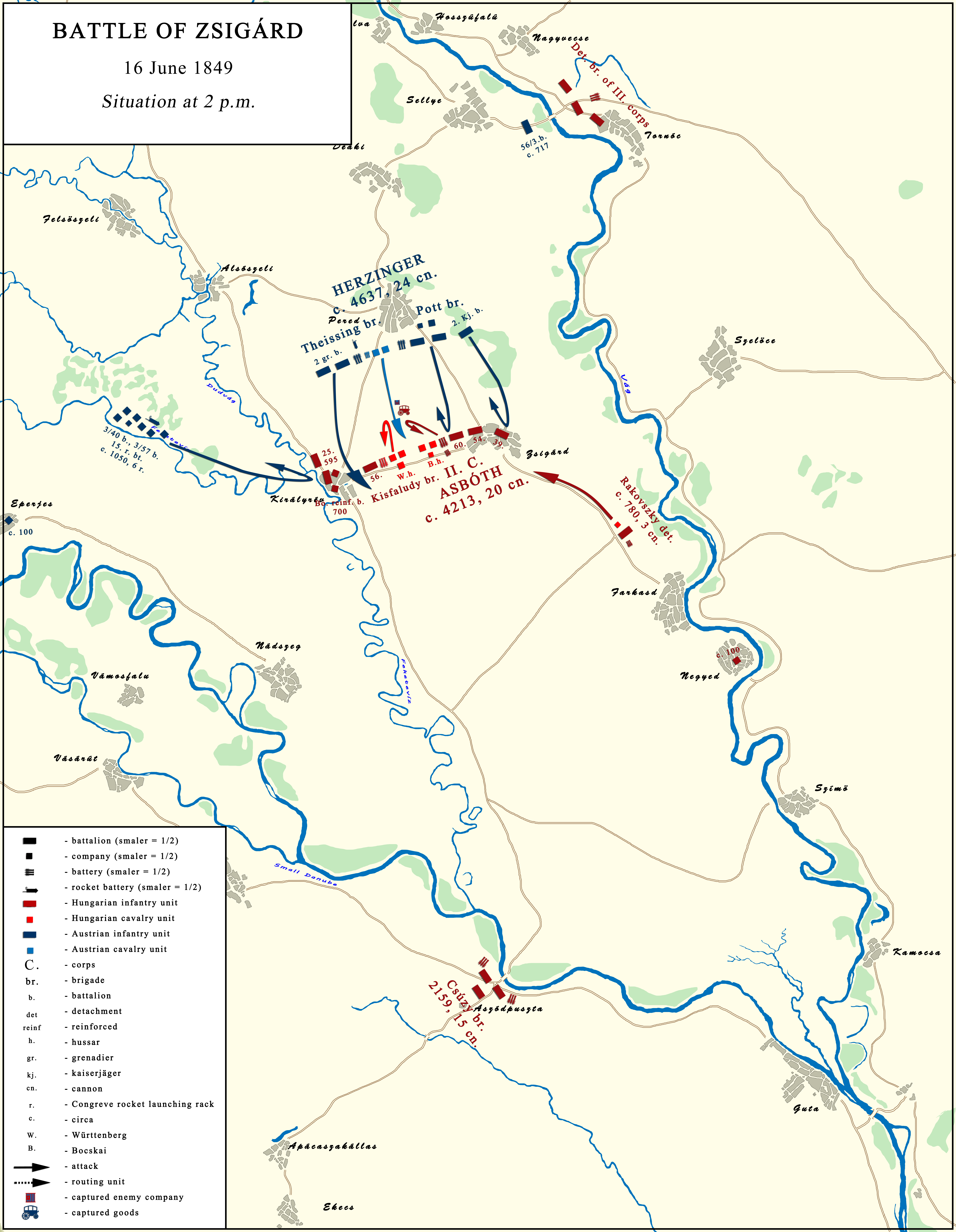
Battle of Zsigárd. Situation at 2 p.m

Early afternoon the situation changed because the Herzinger detachment arrived on the battlefield from the direction of Deáki, which joined the Pott brigade, and now the k.u.k. forces became numerically superior to the Hungarians, the Austrians having around 5,900 soldiers and 24 cannons, while the Hungarians had around 5,000 soldiers and 21 guns. Herzinger took over the leadership of the Austrian troops, deploying the Pott brigade on the left, and the Theissing brigade on the right flank, and after a short resting, he ordered the attack. Asbóth deployed his units in front of Zsigárd, leaving the 39/1. battalion, to protect the village. The bulk of Pott's brigade, which marched from Pered straight to the western exit of Zsigárd, faced the 60. and 54. Honvéd battalions and a battery under the personal command of Asbóth; the 2. kaiserjäger battalion of the same brigade, headed towards the center of Zsigárd defended by the 39. (Dom Miguel) battalion led by Major Collig; while the Theissing brigade from the right flank came face to face with the 56. battalion, 3 companies of the 6. (Württemberg) hussar regiment and the cavalry battery led by Major Kisfaludy. (Note: Bánlaky's book states that actually 56. battalion was on the right flank, but Kemény's researches show that it was actually on the left flank. Probably Bánlaky mixed up the 56. battalion with the 54. battalion.) As it was shown earlier, Asbóth weakened his right flank by sending the 25. battalion to Királyrév.

The battle resumed at 2:00 p.m. when the 54. and 60. Honvéd battalions, the 3 companies of Bocskai hussars, and the 14 cannons of the 1. and 5. infantry batteries repulsed the attack of the k.u.k. troops led by Pott (10/1. and 58/1. Landwehr battalions, 1 ½ company of the 3/57. battalion, and 6 cannons of the 11., and 3. infantry batteries); while, at Zsigárd, the Hungarian 1. Dom Miguel battalion averted the attempt of the 2. k.u.k. kaiserjäger battalions' envelopment attempt.

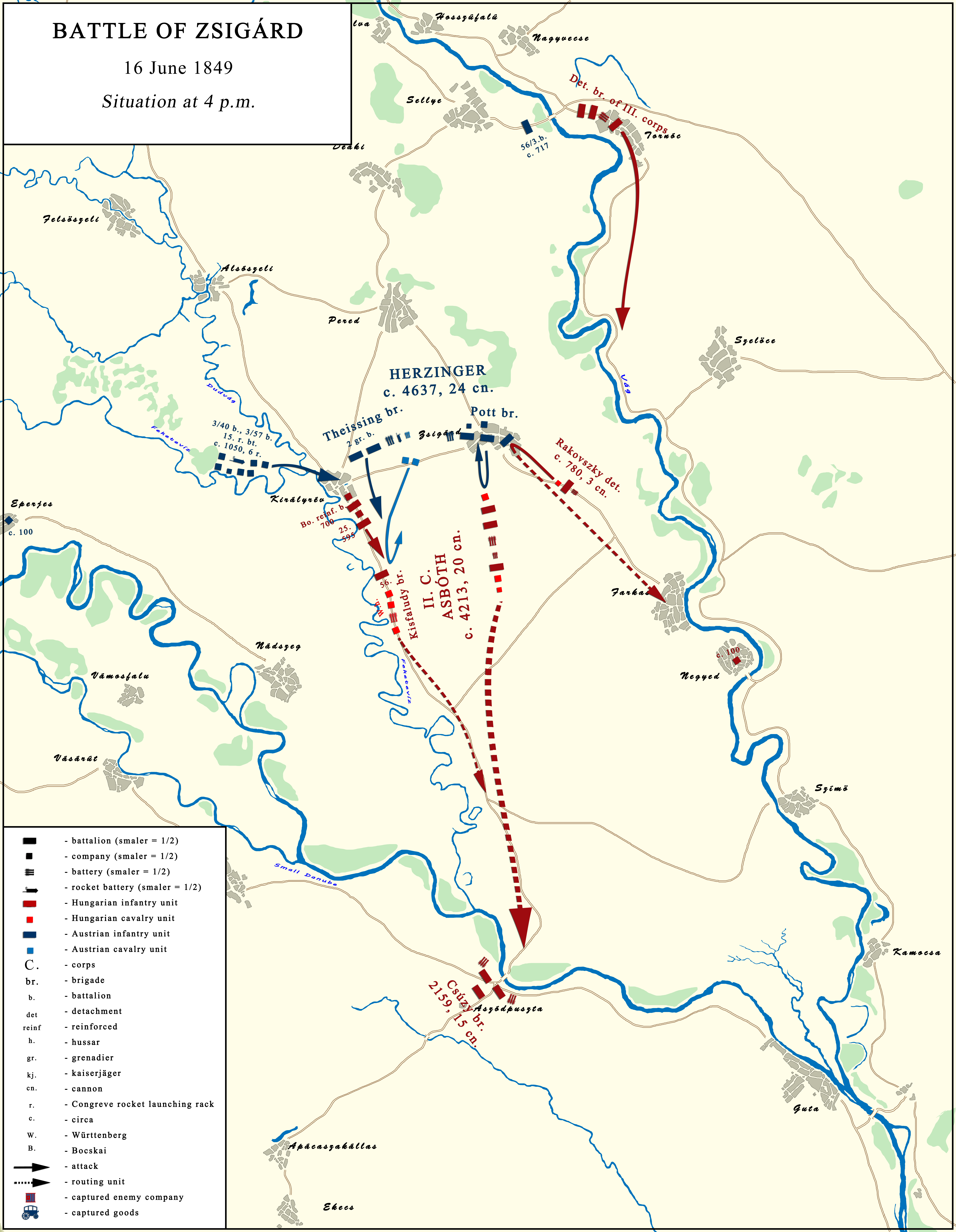
Battle of Zsigárd. Situation at 4 p.m

While on the right flank the Hungarians repulsed the attacks of the evenly sized enemy troops, on the left flank they faced the charge of overwhelming forces. Here, the troops of Major Mór Kisfaludy (56. Honvéd battalion, 3 ½ companies of the 6. Hussar regiment, and 5 cannons of the 2. cavalry battery) were attacked by the 2 elite battalions (the Richter and Schneider grenadier battalions), 2 cavalry companies (3. company of the 5. cuirassier, and one company of the 5. chevau-léger regiments) and 2 artillery batteries (the 19 infantry battery, the 2. cavalry half battery, the 18. Congreve rocket half battery). Major Kisfaludy tried to resolve this problem by deploying the 56. Honvéd battalion in two columns, to mislead the enemy about their numbers, and demand artillery support from Asbóth. Facing the 12 enemy artillery pieces, the 5 Hungarian cannons tried to do their best to compensate their numerical inferiority by shooting as many projectiles as they could, but as the consequence of this they quickly exhausted all their ammunition, so they had to retreat from the battlefield. Still trying to save the situation, and win some time, Major Kisfaludy sent the 6. (Württemberg) hussars to attack, but the counter-attack of the concentrated enemy cavalry, supported by their artillery, totally scattered the hussars; despite the arrival of the 1. infantry battery from the right wing, which could not stop the attack of the enemy cavalry, supported by their cavalry artillery. Finally this battery, unsupported by other units, was forced to retreat, but one of his half batteries was surrounded by Austrian chevau-légers, killing many of their handlers, capturing 3 cannons and an ammunition wagon.

At the same time as the cavalry's breakthrough, the Austrian grenadier battalions, supported by the k.u.k. infantry battery and the half rocket battery, started to encircle the Hungarian left wing, which forced Asbóth to give, around 3 p.m., the order to his troops to start the retreat, which, on the right wing, was carried out in relative order, thanks to the Bocskai hussars and the 5. infantry battery, which covered their retreat. The safe retreat was also helped by the arrival, around 4:00 p.m., to the east side of Zsigárd, of the Rakovszky detachment, expected by Asbóth to arrive much earlier and to play a decisive role in the outcome of the battle. Their arrival forced the Pott brigade to return to the village, and secure it against an eventual counter-attack, because Herzinger believed that the whole Hungarian III. corps arrived on the battlefield. On the left wing, however, the retreating Hungarian troops, which were previously seriously affected by the attack of the k.u.k. cavalry, the retreat was not so smooth. The columns of 56. Honvéd battalion (Note: According to József Bánlaky, the 54. battalion.) were reached from behind and encircled, and crushed, by the Austrian cavalry on the shore of the Dudvág, causing them heavy losses. But the 25. Honvéd battalion, which was retreating from Királyrév counterattacked, and together with the Bocskai battalion, (Note: According to József Bánlaky, the 54. battalion, which regrouped after being, according to him, crushed, counterattacked, not the Bocskai detachment.) caught the Austrian cavalry between two fires, chasing them away, and thanks to this all the units of Asbóth's troops could retreat in order, before the Austrian infantry, supported by the artillery, arrived there.

First, the Hungarian left wing led by Major Kisfaludy, reached Királyrév, still defended by the Bocskai detachment, then also the right wing led by Asbóth. If the Austrians would have pursued them with full strength, they could crush totally the Hungarians, caught between two water flows (the Vág and the Dudvág). But the arrival, as shown above, of the Rakovszky detachment from the direction of Farkasd, prevented the Austrians to reach this goal. The Rakovszky detachment, after securing the II. corps retreat, returned to Negyed, where they finished a bridge across the Vág and defended it against the enemy attacks.]

=== Military actions related to the battle ===
As was shown above, the operational plan of the Central Operational Bureau, for this military action comprised also attacks and demonstrations of other Hungarian corps on other fronts too, to divert the attention of the Austrian troops from the main attack, carried out by the II. corps.

At 2:00 a.m. the Kosztolányi division of the VIII. corps departed from Nagymegyer with 4 battalions, 3 cavalry companies, and 8 cannons towards Csilizpatas and Bős, and attacked, at 7:00 a.m., the Austrian Reischach brigade which was positioned there. The battle started with a cannonade, followed by the counterattack of the Reischach brigade, which pushed back Kosztolányi's troops to Patas and from there to Nagymegyer, where he stopped the pursuit of the retreating Hungarians. The Hungarians lost 20 dead and wounded, while the Austrians 2 dead and 7 wounded soldiers.

That day the III. corps under General Károly Knezić remained mainly inactive. Around 6:30 a.m., a brigade of the III. corps, in accordance with the overall plan, started their demonstration along the line of the Vág, and although this was not too intensive, it managed to capture the attention of the 3/56. line battalion, preventing it to march towards the battlefield. The III. corps led by General Károly Knezić did not cross the Vág, to try to fulfill their tasks according to the battle plan, but the Hungarian General refused to move, despite the demands of his officers. The cannonade of the III. corps lasted the whole day, causing 3/56. k.u.k. line battalion 4 casualties. If Knezić, with his corps, would have appeared at Zsigárd, the outcome of the battle would have been totally different.

In the morning of 16 June, the I. corps sent only reconnaissance units towards Sempte and Szered, and only in the afternoon, when General József Nagysándor heard about Asbóth's corps's initial successes, General Nagysándor ordered the Máriássy division to attack Sempte. First the division occupied the heights east of Sempte, then, from there it started to bombard the entrenchments in front of the village, managing to overpower the k.u.k. artillery. After this, the Máriássy division attacked with 3 battalions Sempte, defended by the 3 grenadier battalions, 2 cavalry companies, and 9 cannons of the Perin brigade. In the beginning the Hungarian battalions advanced successfully, capturing the houses from the edge of the village, but then Lieutenant General Wohlgemuth, who was in command of the Austrians, called the reserve troops from Szered, reinforcing with a part of them the garrison from Sempte, and thanks to this, the Austrians managed to push out the Hungarians from the village. He sent the rest of these reserve troops (1 battalion of infantry and 2 cavalry companies) against the right flank of the advancing Hungarians. Meanwhile, General Nagysándor renewed the attack with the infantry and artillery, occupying the trenches in front of the village, but the battalions entered also in the graveyard, but Wohlgemuth managed to save the situation by sending his last reserve, the Koudelka grenadier battalion and ½ rocket battery, with the help of which he recaptured all the lost ground. When Nagysándor observed the approach of the Austrian column sent earlier by Wohlgemuth to encircle his troops from the right, he ordered his troops to retreat to Vágpatta and Sopornya. To make the taste of the defeat more bitter, the Koudelka battalion managed to reach from behind and capture 4 Hungarian twelve-pounder cannons.

The attack of the I. corps against the imperials entrenched on the Eastern banks of the Vág at Sempte resulted in defeat, the Hungarians losing 79 dead, and 86 wounded soldiers, while the Austrians lost 9 dead and 40 wounded soldiers.

== Aftermath ==
In the battle of Zsigárd, both sides had relatively similar losses. According to their reports, the Pott brigade and the Herzinger detachment lost together 206 soldiers and 5 officers, 50 horses, 3 cannons, and an ammunition wagon. The exact size of the Hungarian losses is not very well known, but they lost at least 200-250 soldiers, with 11-14 officers among them, many horses, 3 cannons, and 1 ammunition wagon.

The Hungarian defeat had multiple causes and three "authors" from the Hungarian side. One was the Hungarian Central Operational Bureau because of its rigid plan, based on the underestimation of the enemy's capacity to mobilize its reserves, the second was General Knezić's lack of initiative, and the third was Asbóth himself. Although he had elaborated a good plan, and, in the first phase of the battle, carried out the attack with great skill and initiative, he stopped at Zsigárd, letting the initiative slip out of his hands. Then during the enemy's counter-attack, he misjudged the situation and deployed his troops wrongly, facilitating the prevail of the Austrian superiority. Nevertheless, during the attack from the first phase of the battle, and the retreat from the end of it, he distinguished himself before his troops with personal bravery and example.

After the battle, Asbóth gathered his scattered soldiers, he recommended those who distinguished themselves for decoration and removed those officers who did not fulfill their duties, as he expected from them. He sent a detachment to Negyed, to help Rakovszky to defend the newly finished bridge across the Vág. Meanwhile, his scouts managed to gather enough information about the size of the Austrian troops in the region, as a result of which, he felt that they are not too strong, and he can defeat them with a new attack. So he gave the order for a new Hungarian attack, scheduled for 20 June. But this time the whole II. corps had to attack Zsigárd, supported by the III. corps, which had to start its attack only after Asbóth took the village. some units of the I. and the VIII. corps had to only demonstrate, to divert the enemy's attention. His opinion was that this time Görgei had to lead the operations.

But the Austrians too were preparing for the continuation of their military actions. Right after the end of the battle, Pott sent half a rocket battery to Vágsellye to reinforce the battalion from there. The commander of the IV. (Reserve) corps, Lieutenant General Ludwig von Wohlgemuth sent to Pered on 19 June the other half of the Theissing brigade, reinforced by some cavalry. The Austrian commanders understood that the Hungarian bridge building from Negyed are signaling the intention of another large-scale Hungarian attack, and Field Marshal Haynau sent on 18 June the combined Russian division led by Lieutenant General Feodor Sergeyevich Panyutyin to reinforce the Austrian troops from the region.

So the table was set for the Battle of Pered.

== Sources ==
- Bánlaky, József (2001). A magyar nemzet hadtörténelme ("The Military History of the Hungarian Nation) (in Hungarian). Budapest: Arcanum Adatbázis.
- Bóna, Gábor (1987). Tábornokok és törzstisztek a szabadságharcban 1848–49 ("Generals and Staff Officers in the War of Freedom 1848–1849") (in Hungarian). Budapest: Zrínyi Katonai Kiadó. p. 430. ISBN 963-326-343-3.
- Hermann, Róbert (2001), 1848-1849 a szabadságharc hadtörténete ("Military History of 1848-1849") (in Hungarian), Budapest: Korona, ISBN 963-9376-21-3
- Hermann, Róbert (2004). Az 1848–1849-es szabadságharc nagy csatái ("Great battles of the Hungarian Revolution of 1848-1849") (in Hungarian). Budapest: Zrínyi. p. 408. ISBN 963-327-367-6.
- Kemény, Krisztián (2018), ""Tüntetés" a fővezér ellen? Görgei Artúr, Asbóth Lajos és a II. hadtest tisztikarának nyilatkozata - 1849. június 22." (PDF), Aetas
- Schmidt-Brentano, Antonio (2007). Die k.k. bzw. k.u.k. Generalität: 1816-1918 ("Imperial and Royal Generals: 1816-1918") (in German). Wien: Österreichisches Staatsarchiv. p. 212.
