= Michal Hipp =

Slovak footballer and manager

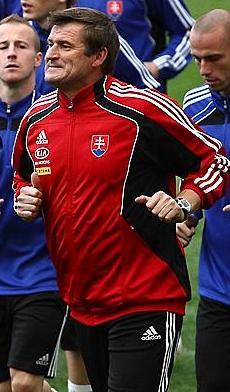
- Hipp in 2011

Personal information
- Date of birth: 13 March 1963 (age 63)
- Place of birth: Nitra, Czechoslovakia
- Height: 1.84 m (6 ft 0 in)
- Position: Defender

Senior career*
Years	Team	Apps	(Gls)
1983	Duslo Šaľa		
1983–1984	Agro Hurbanovo		
1984–1991	Nitra	138	(17)
1991	→ First Vienna (loan)		
1992	Nitra	15	(1)
1993–1994	Slavia Prague	39	(0)
1994–1995	Košice		
1995	Nitra		
1995–1996	MFK Piešťany		
1999–2000	USC Fels am Wagram		

International career
1990–1991	Czechoslovakia	5	(0)
1994	Slovakia	5	(1)

Managerial career
- 1997: ŠM Gabčíkovo (playing coach)
- 2000: Plastika Nitra (assistant)
- 2000–2006: Artmedia Petržalka (assistant)
- 2003–2006: Slovakia (assistant)
- 2006: Artmedia Petržalka
- 2006–2007: Saturn Moscow Region (assistant)
- 2007–2008: Artmedia Petržalka (assistant)
- 2008–2009: Artmedia Petržalka
- 2008–2012: Slovakia (assistant)
- 2009: Slovan Bratislava
- 2012–2013: Slovakia
- 2014–2015: Nitra
- 2016: Vysočina Jihlava
- 2016: Vysočina Jihlava (assistant)
- 2017–2018: Haladás Szombathely
- 2019–2020: Kazakhstan (assistant)
- 2020: Astana
- 2022: Slovan Galanta
- 2022–2023: Haladás Szombathely
- 2023–2024: ViOn Zlaté Moravce
- 2024–2026: Slovan Galanta
- * Club domestic league appearances and goals

Michal Hipp (born 13 March 1963) is a Slovak football manager and a former player.

== Early and personal life ==
Hipp grew up in Horná Kráľová, a village in the district of Šaľa. His son, Patrik, is also a footballer who played for FC Nitra in 2014.

== Playing career ==
Hipp transferred to Slavia Prague in 1993 before returning to Slovakia for family reasons, playing for 1. FC Košice. He returned to his hometown club FC Nitra in August 1995, but an injury ruled him out for three months. Hipp retired from playing in 2000 with Austrian club USC Fels am Wagram.

At international level, Hipp played five matches without scoring a goal in the Czechoslovakia national football team, debuting under coach Milan Máčala in a 1–1 UEFA Euro 1992 qualifying draw against Finland. Following the dissolution of Czechoslovakia, he played five times for Slovakia and scored one goal. After finishing his playing career, Hipp became coach of MFK Petržalka and ŠK Slovan Bratislava.

== Managerial career ==
=== Early managerial career ===
In May 2012, Hipp became coach of Slovakia national football team with Stanislav Griga as his assistant, after the Slovak Football Association failed to hire Pavel Vrba from FC Viktoria Plzeň. Both coaches were sacked on 13 June 2013 after a 1–1 draw with Liechtenstein in a 2014 FIFA World Cup qualification.

In January 2016, Hipp became the head coach of the Czech first league team FC Vysočina Jihlava. After an unsuccessful start to the 2016/17 season, he moved to the position of assistant coach the same year in September, Michal Bílek was appointed head coach. Hipp served as coach of Vysočina Jihlava in January 2017.

=== Hungary and return to Slovakia ===
Hipp was appointed coach of Hungarian club Szombathelyi Haladás on 20 September 2022, a position he previously held between 2017 and 2018. However, Hipp was sacked on 31 May 2023.

Hipp was appointed coach of ViOn Zlaté Moravce on 13 November 2023, but was sacked on 21 February 2024 following poor results with the club. On 6 November 2024, he was appointed to troubled 3. Liga club Slovan Galanta, replacing the sacked Eduard Pagáč.
