= Etela Studeníková =

Slovak archeologist

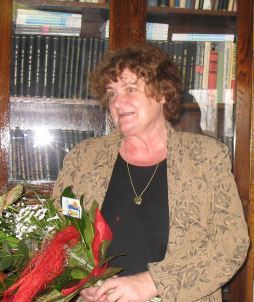
- Born: Etela Pincéšová; 30 March 1946; Kráľová nad Váhom, Czechoslovakia
- Died: 29 May 2023 (aged 77)
- Education: Masaryk University
- Scientific career
- Fields: Ancient history
- Workplaces: Slovak National Museum; Comenius University

Etela Studeníková (née Pincéšová; 30 March 1946 – 29 May 2023) was a Slovak archeologist.

== Biography ==
Studeníková was born on 30 March 1946 in Kráľová nad Váhom. Already as a high school student, she worked at archeological dig sites. She studied ancient history at the Masaryk University, which was at the time known as Jan Evengelista Purkyně University.

After her graduation in 1970 until 1996 Studeníková worked as a researcher at the Slovak National Museum in Bratislava. In 1988, she became the director of the archeological section of the museum. During her time at the museum, she led a high number of archeological research efforts around Bratislava, in particular focusing on Bronze and Iron Ages settlements in the area. In particular her work on the Hallstatt culture settlements was influential in establishing the scientific understanding of the life in the region during the late Bronze Age period.

From 1996 until her retirement in 2007, Studeníková was a professor at the Comenius University, where she taught various of courses focusing on the ancient European history.

== Death ==
Studeníková died on 29 May 2023 at the age of 77.
