= Šaľa District =

Coordinates: 48°9′5″N 17°52′33″E

- District
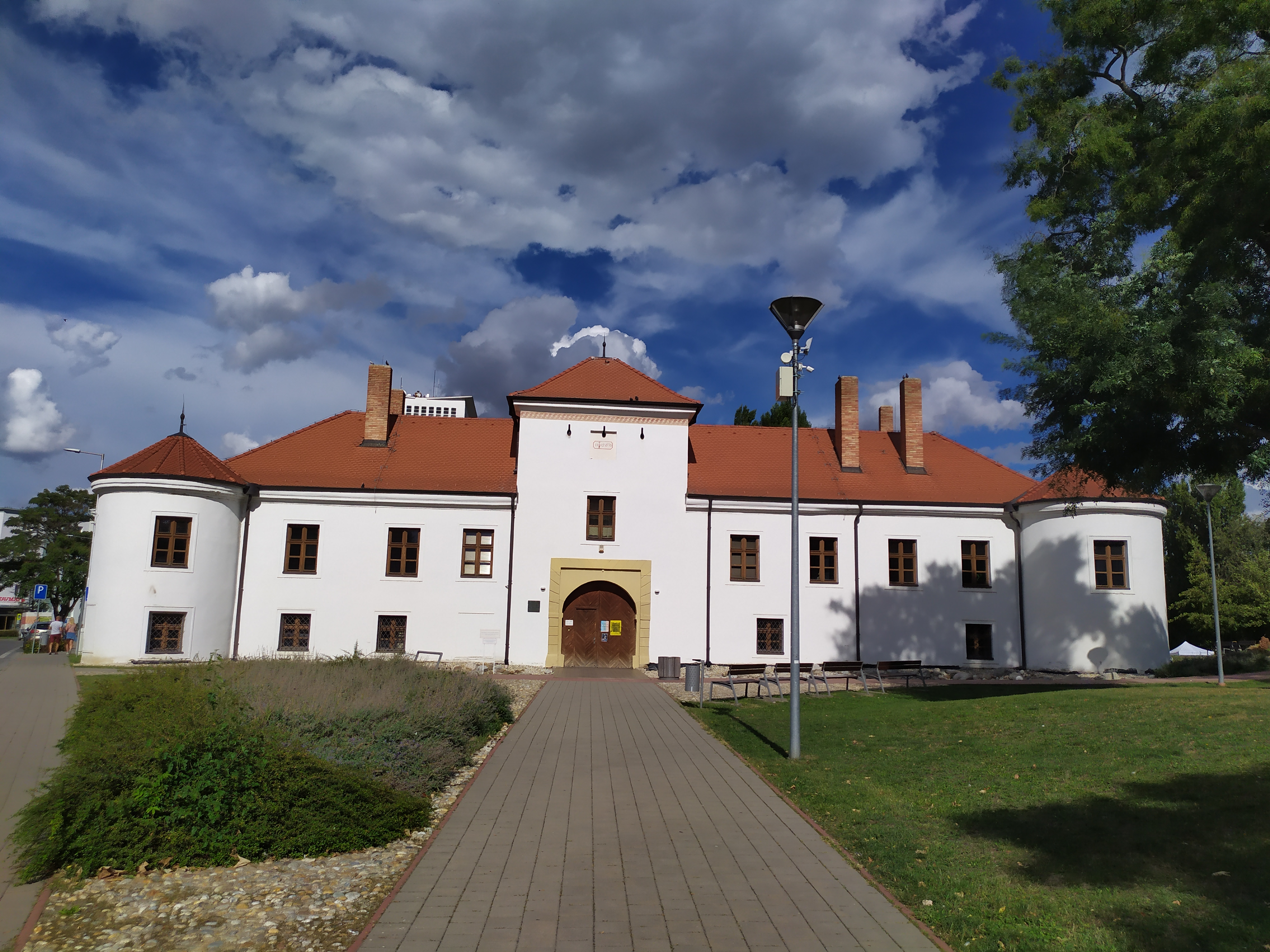
- Country: Slovakia
- Region: Nitra Region
- Seat: Šaľa

Area
  - Total: 355.90 km^{2} (137.41 sq mi)

Population (2025)
  - Total: 49,514
- Time zone: UTC+1 (CET)
  - Summer (DST): UTC+2 (CEST)
- Telephone prefix: 031
- Vehicle registration plate (until 2022): SA
- Municipalities: 13

Šaľa District (Slovak: okres Šaľa; Hungarian: Vágsellyei járás) is a district in the Nitra Region of western Slovakia. Until 1918, the district formed mostly part of the county of Kingdom of Hungary of Nyitra, apart from a small area in the west around Diakovce, Tešedíkovo and Žihárec which formed part of the county of Pressburg.

== Population ==
Population statistic (10 years)
Year	1995	2005	2015	2025
Count	54,611	54,196	52,513	49,514
Difference		−0.75%	−3.10%	−5.71%

Population statistic
Year	2024	2025
Count	49,971	49,514
Difference		−0.91%

It has a population of 49,514 people (31 December 2025).

Historical population
Year	Pop.	±%
1970	50,559	—
1980	52,993	+4.8%
1991	54,159	+2.2%
2001	54,000	−0.3%
2011	53,286	−1.3%
2021	51,477	−3.4%
Source: Statistical Office of the Slovak Republic

=== Ethnicity ===
Census 2021 (1+ %)
Ethnicity	Number	Fraction
Slovak	33,766	62.46%
Hungarian	15,272	28.25%
Not found out	3663	6.77%
Romani	547	1.01%
Total	54,058	

In year 2021 was 54,058 people by ethnicity 33,766 as Slovak, 15,272 as Hungarian, 3663 as Not found out, 547 as Romani, 303 as Czech, 116 as Other, 51 as Russian, 46 as Ukrainian, 31 as Vietnamese, 31 as Rusyn, 27 as Chinese, 26 as Romanian, 25 as Serbian, 22 as Polish, 17 as German, 16 as Italian, 12 as Jewish, 12 as Turkish, 10 as Croatian, 9 as Moravian, 9 as Albanian, 8 as Canadian, 8 as Greek, 8 as Bulgarian, 7 as English, 6 as Austrian, 4 as French, 3 as Irish, 2 as Korean and 1 as Silesian.

Note on population: The difference values of population numbers in the table "Population statistic" and in the sections "Ethnicity" & "Religion" is caused by the use of various statistical methods.

=== Religion ===
Census 2021 (1+ %)
Religion	Number	Fraction
Roman Catholic Church	28,316	55.01%
None	13,708	26.63%
Not found out	3955	7.68%
Calvinist Church	2526	4.91%
Evangelical Church	1564	3.04%
Total	51,477	

In year 2021 was 51,477 people by religion 28,316 from Roman Catholic Church, 13,708 from None, 3955 from Not found out, 2526 from Calvinist Church, 1564 from Evangelical Church, 335 from Greek Catholic Church, 220 from Christian Congregations in Slovakia, 135 from Other and not ascertained christian church, 133 from Jehovah's Witnesses, 123 from Other, 120 from Ad hoc movements, 78 from Eastern Orthodox Church, 70 from Buddhism, 40 from United Methodist Church, 38 from Apostolic Church, 29 from Islam, 22 from Old Catholic Church, 18 from Paganism and natural spirituality, 14 from Jewish community, 10 from Seventh-day Adventist Church, 8 from Hinduism, 6 from Baptists Church, 4 from Church of the Brethren, 2 from Czechoslovak Hussite Church, 2 from Church of Jesus Christ of Latter-day Saints and 1 from Bahá'i Community.

== Municipalities ==
Municipality	Area [km^{2}]	Population
Diakovce	26.27	2,402
Dlhá nad Váhom	9.06	922
Hájske	14.08	1,307
Horná Kráľová	19.11	1,866
Kráľová nad Váhom	9.32	1,877
Močenok	46.39	4,280
Neded	36.00	3,151
Selice	38.35	2,857
Šaľa	44.96	19,534
Tešedíkovo	22.78	3,609
Trnovec nad Váhom	32.53	2,753
Vlčany	39.76	3,097
Žihárec	17.04	1,859

Population and area values are current for year 2025.
