= Selice =

Selice Szelőce
- Municipality
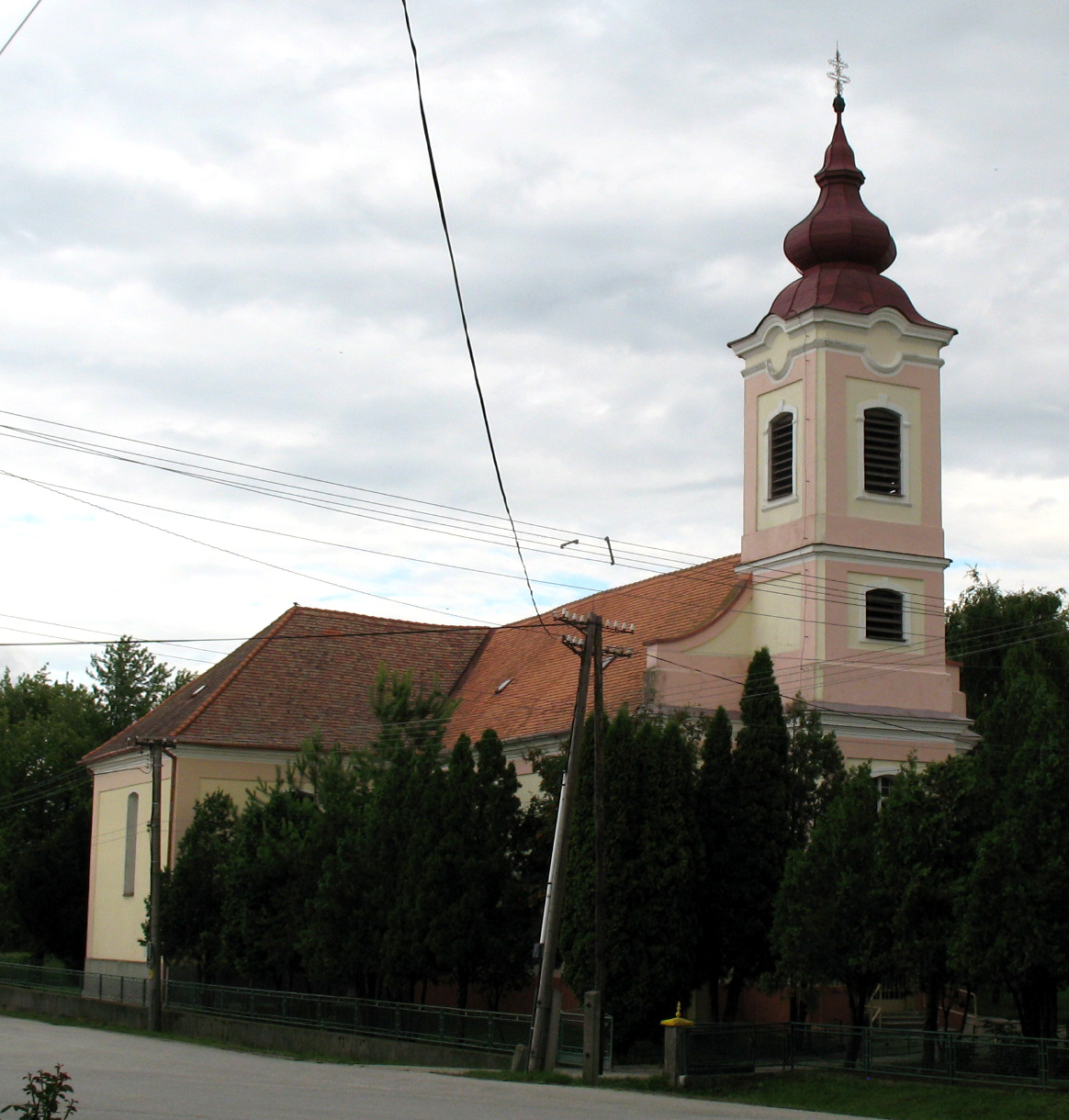
- Church of Saint Michael

- Flag

- Location of Selice in the Nitra Region Location of Selice in Slovakia
- Coordinates: 48.09°N 17.97°E
- Country: Slovakia
- Region: Nitra Region
- District: Šaľa District
- First mentioned: 1078

Government
  - Mayor: Igor Mandák

Area
  - Total: 38.35 km^{2} (14.81 sq mi)
- Elevation: 113 m (371 ft)

Population (2025)
  - Total: 2,857
- Time zone: UTC+1 (CET)
  - Summer (DST): UTC+2 (CEST)
- Postal code: 925 72
- Area code: +421 31
- Vehicle registration plate (until 2022): SA
- Website: www.selice.eu

Selice (Hungarian: Szelőce, formerly Sókszelőce; German: Seleuch) is a village and municipality in Šaľa District, in the Nitra Region of south-west Slovakia.

== Geography ==
The municipality lies at an altitude of 113 metres (371 ft) and covers an area of 38.35 km^{2} (14.81 sq mi) (2025).

== History ==
In historical records the village was first mentioned in 1078. In the 16th century, it was destroyed by Ottoman Turks. After the Habsburg monarchy collapse in November 1918, Czechoslovak troops occupied the area, later acknowledged internationally by the Treaty of Trianon. Between 1938 and 1945 Selice nad Dunajom once more became part of Miklós Horthy's Hungary through the First Vienna Award. From 1945 until the Velvet Divorce, it was part of Czechoslovakia. Since then it has been part of Slovakia. In 1946, the separate (and larger) village of Šók (Slovak; Sók or Magyarsók in Hungarian, Šóka in Romani) became part of Selice.

== Population ==
Population statistic (10 years)
Year	1995	2005	2015	2025
Count	2828	2925	2833	2857
Difference		+3.42%	−3.14%	+0.84%

Population statistic
Year	2024	2025
Count	2846	2857
Difference		+0.38%

It has a population of 2857 people (31 December 2025).

=== Ethnicity ===
Census 2021 (1+ %)
Ethnicity	Number	Fraction
Slovak	1507	52.47%
Hungarian	1104	38.44%
Not found out	378	13.16%
Romani	260	9.05%
Total	2872	

In year 2021 was 2872 people by ethnicity 1507 as Slovak, 1104 as Hungarian, 378 as Not found out, 260 as Romani, 25 as Czech, 7 as Romanian, 2 as Ukrainian, 2 as Russian, 2 as German and 1 as Polish.

Note on population: The difference values of population numbers in the table "Population statistic" and in the sections "Ethnicity" & "Religion" is caused by the use of various statistical methods.

=== Religion ===
Census 2021 (1+ %)
Religion	Number	Fraction
Roman Catholic Church	1772	61.7%
None	486	16.92%
Not found out	347	12.08%
Calvinist Church	169	5.88%
Evangelical Church	32	1.11%
Total	2872	

In year 2021 was 2872 people by religion 1772 from Roman Catholic Church, 486 from None, 347 from Not found out, 169 from Calvinist Church, 32 from Evangelical Church, 25 from Greek Catholic Church, 18 from Jehovah's Witnesses, 5 from Other and not ascertained christian church, 5 from Christian Congregations in Slovakia, 3 from Paganism and natural spirituality, 2 from Old Catholic Church, 2 from United Methodist Church, 2 from Church of Jesus Christ of Latter-day Saints, 2 from Apostolic Church, 1 from Hinduism and 1 from Buddhism.

According to the 2011 census, the municipality had 2,859 inhabitants. 1,416 of inhabitants were Hungarians, 1,241 Slovaks, 107 Roma, 18 Czechs and 77 others and unspecified.

In a 2001 census, 59% (1682) of the inhabitants claimed Hungarian ethnicity, 36% (1011) Slovak ethnicity and 4% (108) Romani (Gypsy) ethnicity.

In a 1991 census, the numbers were 75% (2079), 21% (565) and 3% (83), respectively. The main reason behind the apparent decrease in the number of ethnic Hungarians is the fact that most Roma, who in fact represented 52% (1479) of the village population in 2005, claimed Slovak or Hungarian ethnicity. According to a 1968 census, there were 787 ‘citizens of Gypsy origin’ in Selice.

== Facilities ==
The village has a public library and a gymnasium.
