= Trnovec nad Váhom =

Trnovec nad Váhom Tornóc
- Municipality
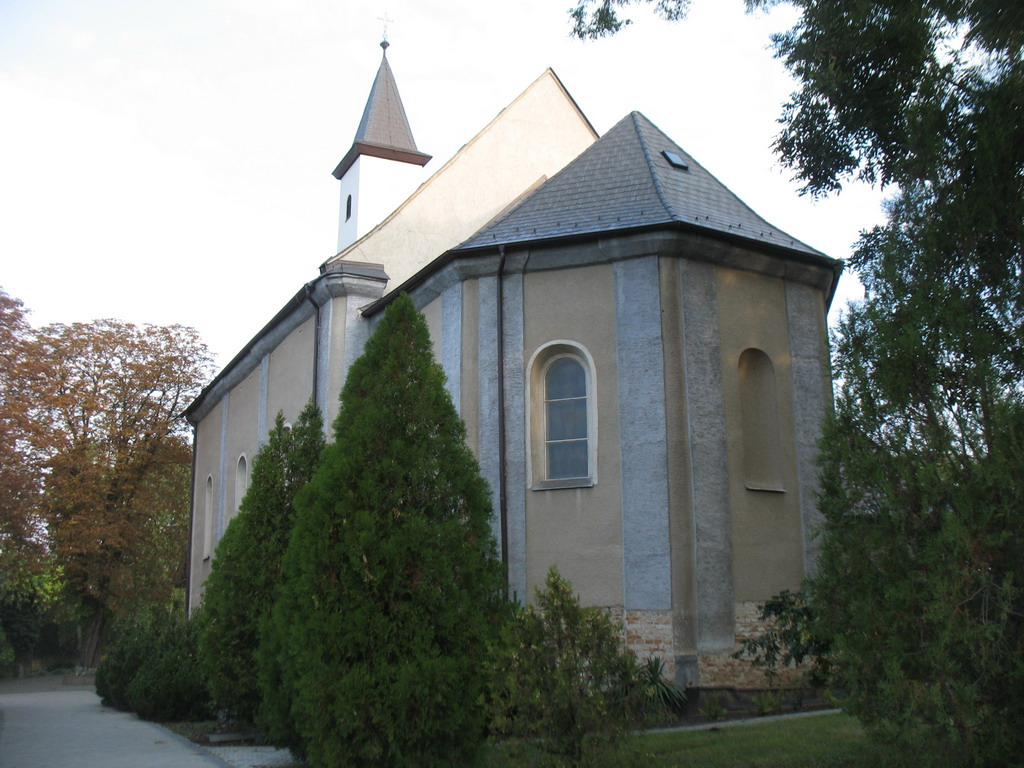
- Church of the Transfiguration of the Christ

- Flag

- Location of Trnovec nad Váhom in the Nitra Region Location of Trnovec nad Váhom in Slovakia
- Coordinates: 48.15°N 17.93°E
- Country: Slovakia
- Region: Nitra Region
- District: Šaľa District
- First mentioned: 1113

Government
  - Mayor: Ján Hrabovský

Area
  - Total: 32.53 km^{2} (12.56 sq mi)
- Elevation: 116 m (381 ft)

Population (2025)
  - Total: 2,753
- Time zone: UTC+1 (CET)
  - Summer (DST): UTC+2 (CEST)
- Postal code: 925 71
- Area code: +421 31
- Vehicle registration plate (until 2022): SA
- Website: www.trnovecnadvahom.sk

Trnovec nad Váhom (Hungarian: Tornóc) is a village and municipality in Šaľa District, in the Nitra Region of south-west Slovakia.

== Geography ==
The municipality lies at an altitude of 116 metres (381 ft) and covers an area of 32.53 km^{2} (12.56 sq mi) (2025).

== History ==
In historical records the village was first mentioned in 1113. Until 1918 the area was part of the Austro-Hungarian empire. By the Treaty of Trianon the area was awarded to the newly formed state of Czechoslovakia. Between 1938 and 1945 Trnovec nad Váhom once more became part of Miklós Horthy's Hungary through the First Vienna Award. From 1945 until the Velvet Divorce, it was part of Czechoslovakia. Since then it has been part of Slovakia.

== Population ==
Population statistic (10 years)
Year	1995	2005	2015	2025
Count	2491	2646	2648	2753
Difference		+6.22%	+0.07%	+3.96%

Population statistic
Year	2024	2025
Count	2757	2753
Difference		−0.14%

It has a population of 2753 people (31 December 2025).

=== Ethnicity ===
Census 2021 (1+ %)
Ethnicity	Number	Fraction
Slovak	2160	77.58%
Hungarian	372	13.36%
Not found out	328	11.78%
Total	2784	

In year 2021 was 2784 people by ethnicity 2160 as Slovak, 372 as Hungarian, 328 as Not found out, 20 as Czech, 10 as Romani, 10 as Other, 4 as Rusyn, 2 as Jewish, 2 as Serbian, 1 as Ukrainian, 1 as Italian and 1 as Russian.

Note on population: The difference values of population numbers in the table "Population statistic" and in the sections "Ethnicity" & "Religion" is caused by the use of various statistical methods.

=== Religion ===
Census 2021 (1+ %)
Religion	Number	Fraction
Roman Catholic Church	1352	48.56%
None	930	33.41%
Not found out	324	11.64%
Evangelical Church	74	2.66%
Calvinist Church	35	1.26%
Total	2784	

In year 2021 was 2784 people by religion 1352 from Roman Catholic Church, 930 from None, 324 from Not found out, 74 from Evangelical Church, 35 from Calvinist Church, 19 from Christian Congregations in Slovakia, 19 from Greek Catholic Church, 7 from Ad hoc movements, 5 from Other and not ascertained christian church, 4 from Apostolic Church, 2 from Eastern Orthodox Church, 2 from Jehovah's Witnesses, 2 from Hinduism, 2 from Buddhism, 1 from Jewish community, 1 from Old Catholic Church, 1 from Paganism and natural spirituality, 1 from Other, 1 from United Methodist Church, 1 from Seventh-day Adventist Church and 1 from Baptists Church.

According to the 2011 census, the municipality had 2,652 inhabitants. 2,018 of inhabitants were Slovaks, 469 Hungarians, 16 Czechs and 149 others and unspecified.

== People ==
Famous people born in the village include Peter Andruška a poet and Eduard Kukan politician. Emmerich Weisz an eminent Cloth Merchant who moved to Vienna and finally to London to found the WM Woollen Export Co. LTD. Emerich Weisz had 11 brothers and sisters. His mother died when he was 11 years old and after his father remarried, he was brought up by his eldest sister. He was of Jewish descent. In his youth he played football for the MTK club in Budapest, moving to Vienna to found his company Emerich Weisz. In 1936 he founded WM Woollen Export Co Ltd in London hoping to escape the developing antisemitism in Austria. The Anschluss in Austria forced him to emigrate to the UK in 1937. Emerich and Emily Weisz had one daughter Olga who had four children and they adopted their first born Grandson Brian Weisz in 1946. Brian bought the business in 1974 after his Grandmother retired. Brian sold the business in 2004. Emerich Weisz was born in 1891 and died in London 21st Oct 1963.

== Facilities ==
The village has a public library a gym and a football pitch.
