= Vlčany =

Vlčany Vágfarkasd
- Municipality
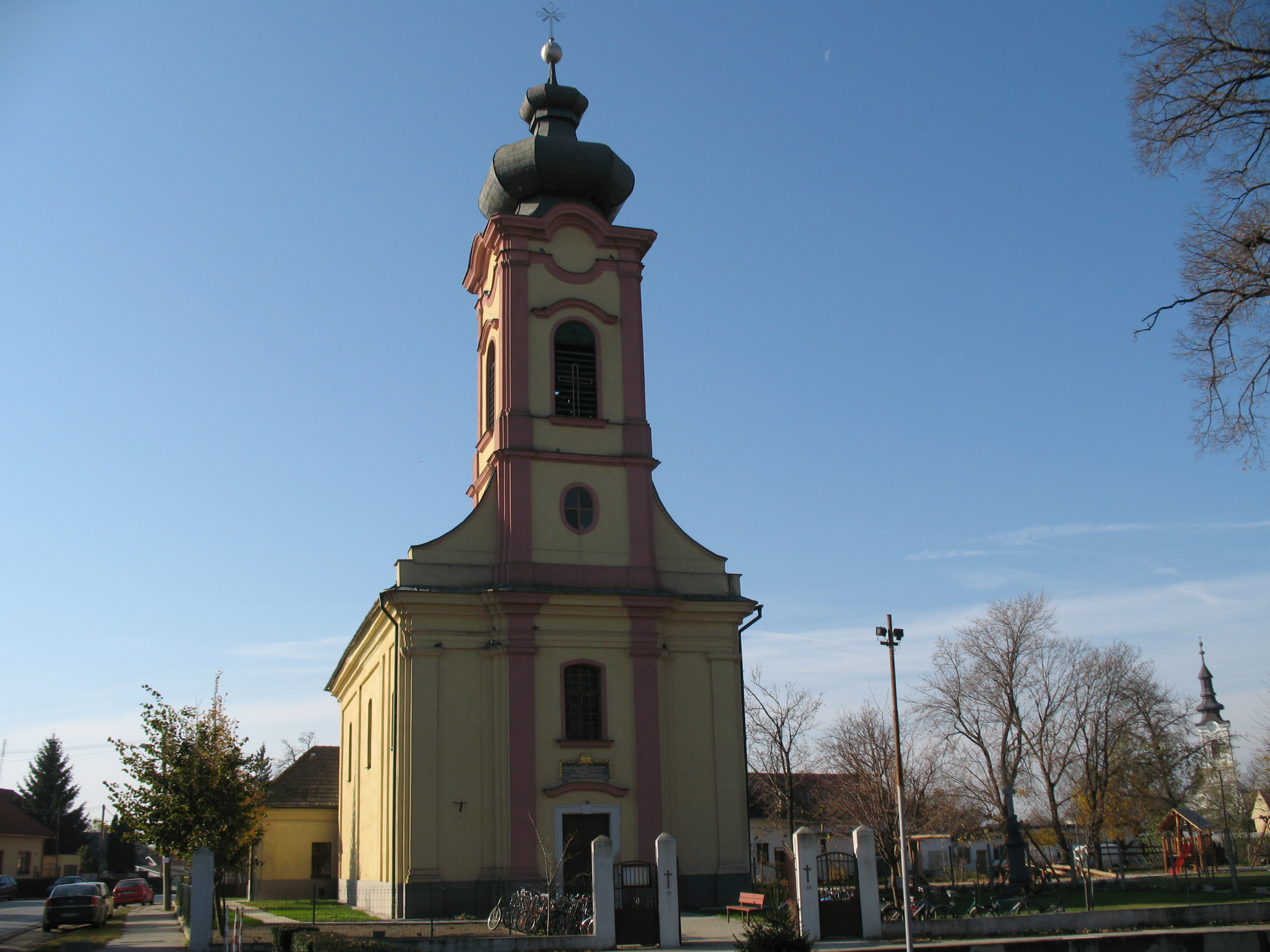
- Roman Catholic church

- Flag

- Location of Vlčany in the Nitra Region Location of Vlčany in Slovakia
- Coordinates: 48.03°N 17.95°E
- Country: Slovakia
- Region: Nitra Region
- District: Šaľa District
- First mentioned: 1113

Government
  - Mayor: János Restár

Area
  - Total: 39.76 km^{2} (15.35 sq mi)
- Elevation: 111 m (364 ft)

Population (2025)
  - Total: 3,097
- Time zone: UTC+1 (CET)
  - Summer (DST): UTC+2 (CEST)
- Postal code: 925 84
- Area code: +421 31
- Vehicle registration plate (until 2022): SA
- Website: www.obecvlcany.sk

Vlčany (Hungarian: Vágfarkasd) is a village and municipality in Šaľa District, in the Nitra Region of south-west Slovakia.

== Geography ==
The municipality lies at an altitude of 111 metres (364 ft) and covers an area of 39.76 km^{2} (15.35 sq mi) (2025).

== History ==
In historical records the village was first mentioned in 1113. After the Austro-Hungarian army disintegrated in November 1918, Czechoslovak troops occupied the area, later acknowledged internationally by the Treaty of Trianon. Between 1938 and 1945 Vlčany once more became part of Miklós Horthy's Hungary through the First Vienna Award. From 1945 until the Velvet Divorce, it was part of Czechoslovakia. Since then it has been part of Slovakia.

== Population ==
Population statistic (10 years)
Year	1995	2005	2015	2025
Count	3371	3442	3274	3097
Difference		+2.10%	−4.88%	−5.40%

Population statistic
Year	2024	2025
Count	3131	3097
Difference		−1.08%

It has a population of 3097 people (31 December 2025).

=== Ethnicity ===
Census 2021 (1+ %)
Ethnicity	Number	Fraction
Hungarian	2091	64.93%
Slovak	1047	32.51%
Not found out	229	7.11%
Total	3220	

In year 2021 was 3220 people by ethnicity 2091 as Hungarian, 1047 as Slovak, 229 as Not found out, 11 as Romani, 8 as Czech, 4 as Vietnamese, 4 as Ukrainian, 2 as Turkish, 2 as Other, 1 as Italian, 1 as Serbian, 1 as Polish, 1 as German, 1 as Moravian and 1 as Greek.

Note on population: The difference values of population numbers in the table "Population statistic" and in the sections "Ethnicity" & "Religion" is caused by the use of various statistical methods.

=== Religion ===
Census 2021 (1+ %)
Religion	Number	Fraction
Roman Catholic Church	1147	35.62%
Calvinist Church	833	25.87%
None	767	23.82%
Not found out	248	7.7%
Evangelical Church	128	3.98%
Jehovah's Witnesses	49	1.52%
Total	3220	

In year 2021 was 3220 people by religion 1147 from Roman Catholic Church, 833 from Calvinist Church, 767 from None, 248 from Not found out, 128 from Evangelical Church, 49 from Jehovah's Witnesses, 23 from Greek Catholic Church, 6 from Buddhism, 4 from Ad hoc movements, 3 from Christian Congregations in Slovakia, 3 from United Methodist Church, 2 from Eastern Orthodox Church, 2 from Islam, 1 from Jewish community, 1 from Old Catholic Church, 1 from Other and not ascertained christian church, 1 from Other and 1 from Apostolic Church.

It has a population of about 3460 people. The town is about 72% Magyar, 26% Slovak and 2% Romany.

== Government ==
The town has its own birth registry office and police force covering the municipality.

== Facilities ==
The town has a public library, a gymnasium and a football pitch. It also has a DVD rental store, a cinema, and a pharmacy.
