= Horná Kráľová =

Horná Kráľová Királyi
- Municipality
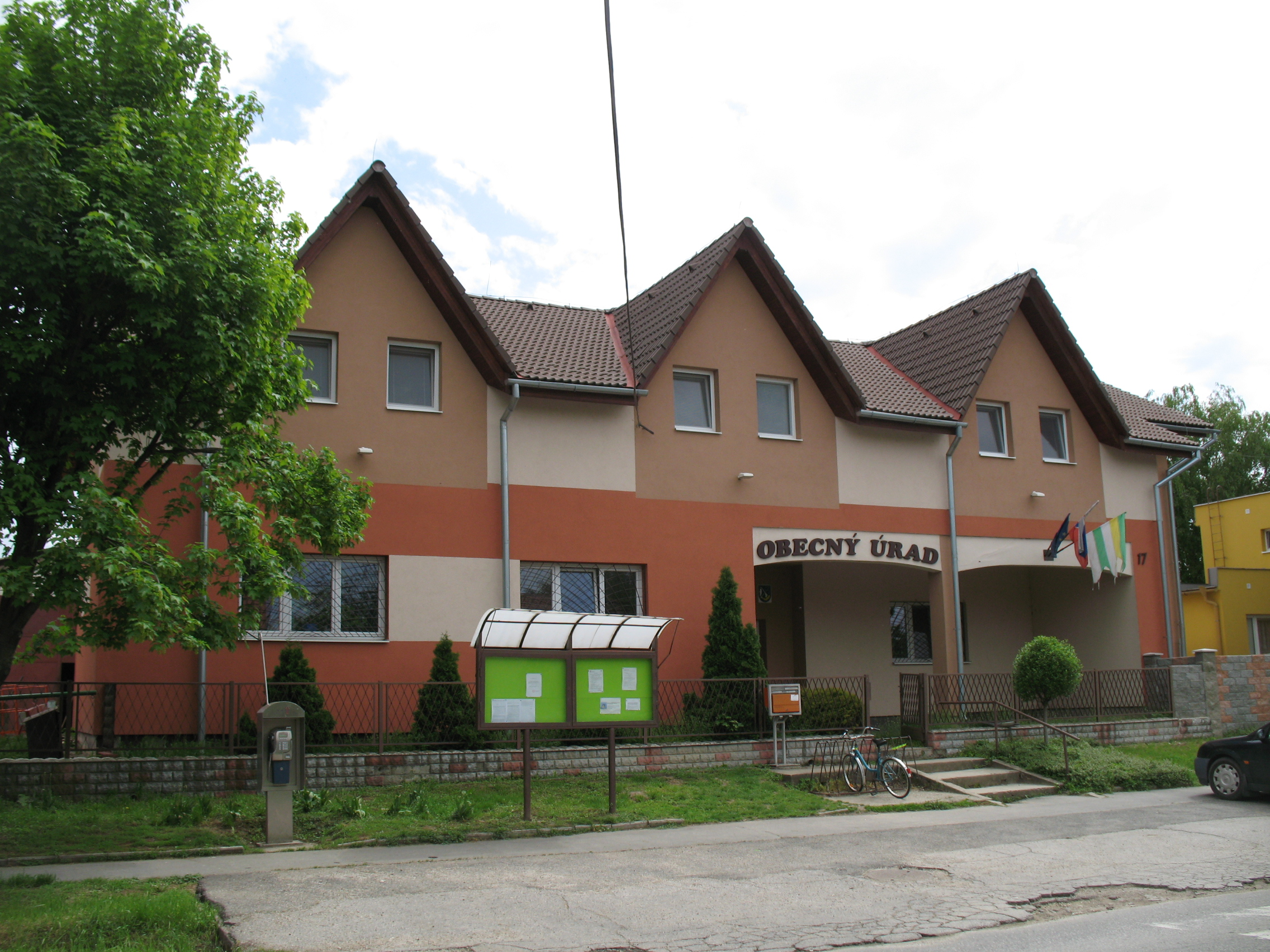
- Municipal office

- Flag

- Location of Horná Kráľová in the Nitra Region Location of Horná Kráľová in Slovakia
- Coordinates: 48.23°N 17.92°E
- Country: Slovakia
- Region: Nitra Region
- District: Šaľa District
- First mentioned: 1113

Area
  - Total: 19.11 km^{2} (7.38 sq mi)
- Elevation: 142 m (466 ft)

Population (2025)
  - Total: 1,866
- Time zone: UTC+1 (CET)
  - Summer (DST): UTC+2 (CEST)
- Postal code: 951 32
- Area code: +421 37
- Vehicle registration plate (until 2022): SA
- Website: www.hornakralova.sk

Horná Kráľová (Hungarian: Királyi) is a village and municipality in Šaľa District, in the Nitra Region of south-west Slovakia.

== History ==
In historical records the village was first mentioned in 1113.

== Geography ==
The municipality lies at an altitude of 142 metres (466 ft) and covers an area of 19.11 km^{2} (7.38 sq mi) (2025).

== Population ==
Population statistic (10 years)
Year	1995	2005	2015	2025
Count	1963	1842	1884	1866
Difference		−6.16%	+2.28%	−0.95%

Population statistic
Year	2024	2025
Count	1871	1866
Difference		−0.26%

It has a population of 1866 people (31 December 2025).

=== Ethnicity ===
Census 2021 (1+ %)
Ethnicity	Number	Fraction
Slovak	1598	85.63%
Hungarian	206	11.03%
Not found out	116	6.21%
Total	1866	

In year 2021 was 1866 people by ethnicity 1598 as Slovak, 206 as Hungarian, 116 as Not found out, 14 as Romani, 8 as Czech, 3 as Other, 2 as Serbian, 1 as Rusyn, 1 as Russian, 1 as Romanian and 1 as English.

Note on population: The difference values of population numbers in the table "Population statistic" and in the sections "Ethnicity" & "Religion" is caused by the use of various statistical methods.

=== Religion ===
Census 2021 (1+ %)
Religion	Number	Fraction
Roman Catholic Church	1443	77.33%
None	250	13.4%
Not found out	119	6.38%
Total	1866	

In year 2021 was 1866 people by religion 1443 from Roman Catholic Church, 250 from None, 119 from Not found out, 12 from Greek Catholic Church, 10 from Christian Congregations in Slovakia, 8 from Evangelical Church, 7 from Ad hoc movements, 6 from Other, 3 from Calvinist Church, 2 from Old Catholic Church, 2 from Jehovah's Witnesses, 2 from Buddhism, 1 from Paganism and natural spirituality and 1 from Apostolic Church.

== Facilities ==
The village has a public library and a football pitch.

== Genealogical resources ==
The records for genealogical research are available at the state archive "Statny Archiv in Nitra, Slovakia"

- Roman Catholic church records (births/marriages/deaths): 1673-1895 (parish B)

== See also ==
- List of municipalities and towns in Slovakia
