= Kráľová nad Váhom =

Kráľová nad Váhom Vágkirályfa
- Municipality
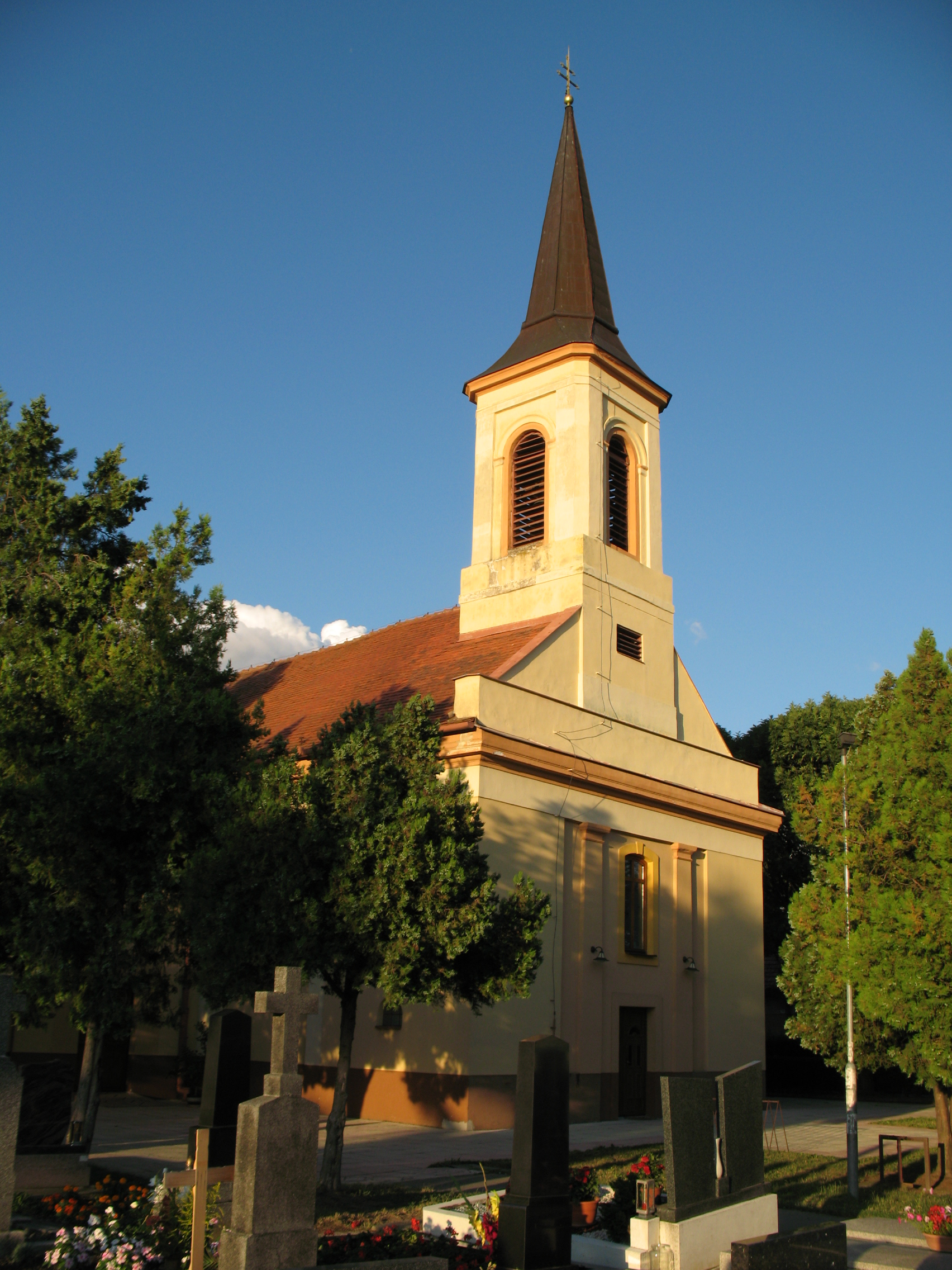
- Church of Saint Elisabeth

- Flag

- Location of Kráľová nad Váhom in the Nitra Region Location of Kráľová nad Váhom in Slovakia
- Coordinates: 48.17°N 17.84°E
- Country: Slovakia
- Region: Nitra Region
- District: Šaľa District
- First mentioned: 1113

Government
  - Mayor: Ferenc Bergendi

Area
  - Total: 9.32 km^{2} (3.60 sq mi)
- Elevation: 117 m (384 ft)

Population (2025)
  - Total: 1,877
- Time zone: UTC+1 (CET)
  - Summer (DST): UTC+2 (CEST)
- Postal code: 925 91
- Area code: +421 31
- Vehicle registration plate (until 2022): SA
- Website: www.kralovanadvahom.sk

Kráľová nad Váhom (Hungarian: Vágkirályfa) is a village and municipality in Šaľa District, in the Nitra Region of southwest Slovakia.

== Geography ==
The municipality lies at an altitude of 117 metres (384 ft) and covers an area of 9.32 km^{2} (3.60 sq mi) (2025).

== History ==
In historical records the village was first mentioned in 1113. After the Austro-Hungarian army disintegrated in November 1918, Czechoslovak troops occupied the area, later acknowledged internationally by the Treaty of Trianon. Between 1938 and 1945 Kráľová nad Váhom once more became part of Miklós Horthy's Hungary through the First Vienna Award. From 1945 until the Velvet Divorce, it was part of Czechoslovakia. Since then it has been part of Slovakia.

== Population ==
Population statistic (10 years)
Year	1995	2005	2015	2025
Count	1503	1587	1748	1877
Difference		+5.58%	+10.14%	+7.37%

Population statistic
Year	2024	2025
Count	1857	1877
Difference		+1.07%

It has a population of 1877 people (31 December 2025).

=== Ethnicity ===
Census 2021 (1+ %)
Ethnicity	Number	Fraction
Hungarian	1012	55.36%
Slovak	805	44.03%
Not found out	83	4.54%
Total	1828	

In year 2021 was 1828 people by ethnicity 1012 as Hungarian, 805 as Slovak, 83 as Not found out, 11 as Other, 7 as Czech, 3 as Vietnamese, 3 as Albanian, 1 as Ukrainian, 1 as Romani, 1 as Russian, 1 as Romanian, 1 as Polish and 1 as Moravian.

Note on population: The difference values of population numbers in the table "Population statistic" and in the sections "Ethnicity" & "Religion" is caused by the use of various statistical methods.

=== Religion ===
Census 2021 (1+ %)
Religion	Number	Fraction
Roman Catholic Church	1163	63.62%
None	503	27.52%
Not found out	77	4.21%
Evangelical Church	26	1.42%
Total	1828	

In year 2021 was 1828 people by religion 1163 from Roman Catholic Church, 503 from None, 77 from Not found out, 26 from Evangelical Church, 14 from Calvinist Church, 11 from Greek Catholic Church, 9 from Christian Congregations in Slovakia, 6 from Ad hoc movements, 4 from Eastern Orthodox Church, 3 from Other and not ascertained christian church, 3 from Other, 2 from Paganism and natural spirituality, 2 from United Methodist Church, 2 from Buddhism, 1 from Jehovah's Witnesses, 1 from Islam and 1 from Baptists Church.

According to the 2011 census, the municipality had 1,691 inhabitants. 1,149 of inhabitants were Hungarians, 485 Slovaks and 55 others and unspecified.

== Notable people ==
- Etela Studeníková (1946–2023) archeologist

== Facilities ==
The village has a public library, a DVD rental store a gym and a football pitch.
