= Diakovce =

Diakovce Deáki
- Municipality
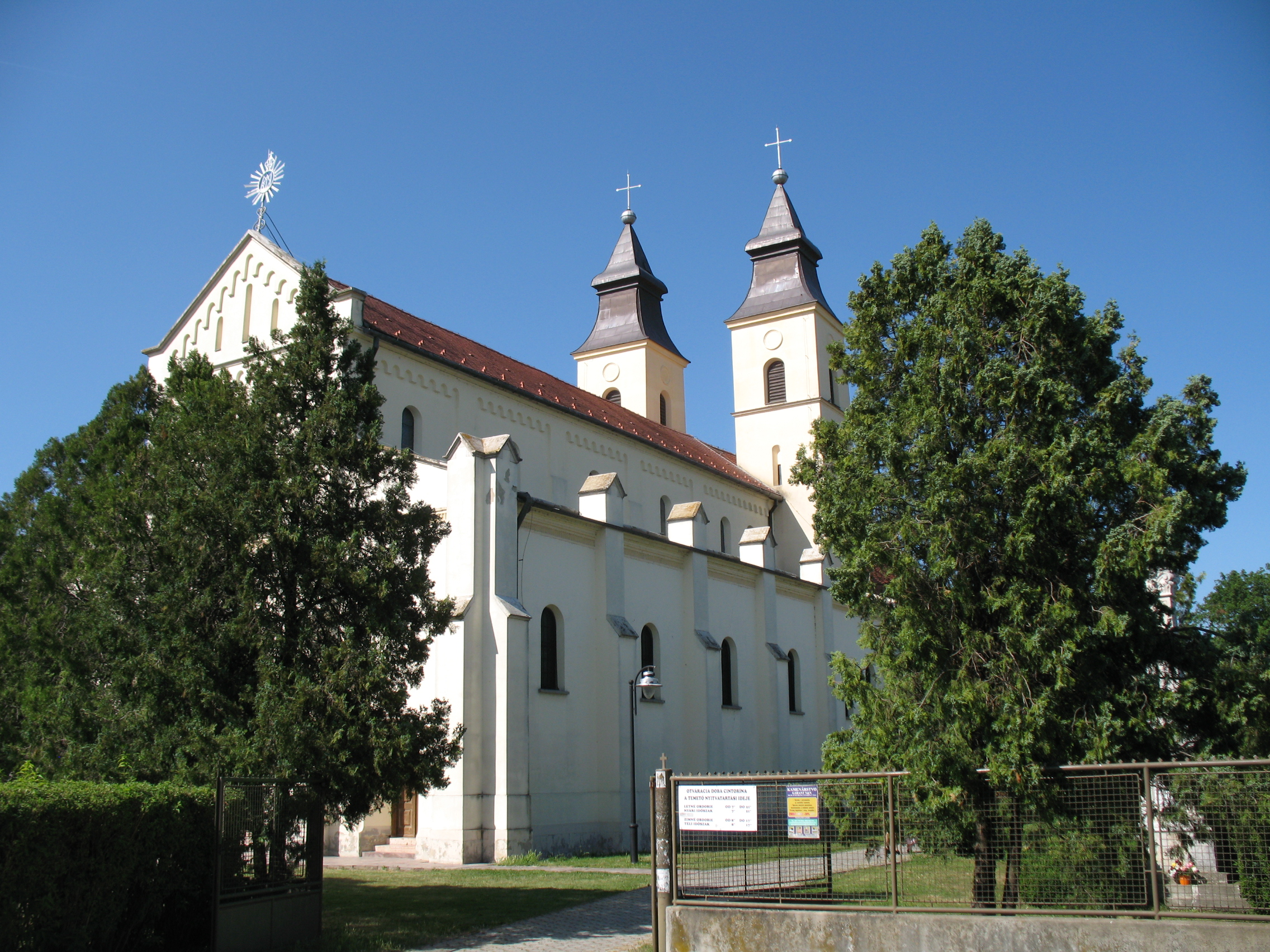
- Church of the Assumption of the Virgin Mary

- Flag

- Location of Diakovce in the Nitra Region Location of Diakovce in Slovakia
- Coordinates: 48.13°N 17.84°E
- Country: Slovakia
- Region: Nitra Region
- District: Šaľa District
- First mentioned: 1002

Government
  - Mayor: Kristína Jakócsová

Area
  - Total: 26.27 km^{2} (10.14 sq mi)
- Elevation: 115 m (377 ft)

Population (2025)
  - Total: 2,402
- Time zone: UTC+1 (CET)
  - Summer (DST): UTC+2 (CEST)
- Postal code: 925 81
- Area code: +421 31
- Vehicle registration plate (until 2022): SA
- Website: www.diakovce.sk

Diakovce is an old village and municipality in Šaľa District, in the Nitra Region of southwest Slovakia.

== Geography ==
The municipality lies at an altitude of 115 metres (377 ft) and covers an area of 26.27 km^{2} (10.14 sq mi) (2025).

== History ==
In historical records the village was first mentioned in 1002 meaning that it is one of the oldest recorded villages in present-day Slovakia. In 1001, Stephen I of Hungary deployed Benedictines here. From that time, the area was the property of the Pannonhalma Abbey. In 1228 a twin-towered Romanesque cathedral, the oldest surviving monument in Slovakia, ever built.

After the Austro-Hungarian army disintegrated in November 1918, Czechoslovak troops occupied the area, later acknowledged internationally by the Treaty of Trianon. Between 1938 and 1945 Diakovce once more became part of Miklós Horthy's Hungary through the First Vienna Award. From 1945 until the Velvet Divorce, it was part of Czechoslovakia. Since then it has been part of Slovakia.

== Population ==
Population statistic (10 years)
Year	1995	2005	2015	2025
Count	2120	2242	2255	2402
Difference		+5.75%	+0.57%	+6.51%

Population statistic
Year	2024	2025
Count	2377	2402
Difference		+1.05%

It has a population of 2402 people (31 December 2025).

=== Ethnicity ===
Census 2021 (1+ %)
Ethnicity	Number	Fraction
Hungarian	1295	54.38%
Slovak	1037	43.55%
Not found out	124	5.2%
Romani	24	1%
Total	2381	

In year 2021 was 2381 people by ethnicity 1295 as Hungarian, 1037 as Slovak, 124 as Not found out, 24 as Romani, 10 as Czech, 8 as Other, 5 as Greek, 2 as Ukrainian, 2 as Italian, 2 as Romanian, 1 as German and 1 as Albanian.

Note on population: The difference values of population numbers in the table "Population statistic" and in the sections "Ethnicity" & "Religion" is caused by the use of various statistical methods.

=== Religion ===
Census 2021 (1+ %)
Religion	Number	Fraction
Roman Catholic Church	1330	55.86%
None	505	21.21%
Calvinist Church	213	8.95%
Evangelical Church	141	5.92%
Not found out	117	4.91%
Other and not ascertained christian church	25	1.05%
Total	2381	

In year 2021 was 2381 people by religion 1330 from Roman Catholic Church, 505 from None, 213 from Calvinist Church, 141 from Evangelical Church, 117 from Not found out, 25 from Other and not ascertained christian church, 22 from Greek Catholic Church, 12 from Christian Congregations in Slovakia, 4 from Other, 4 from Apostolic Church, 2 from Old Catholic Church, 2 from Islam, 2 from Ad hoc movements, 1 from Jehovah's Witnesses and 1 from Buddhism.

== Facilities ==
The village has a public library, a gym a swimming pool and a football pitch.

== Genealogical resources ==
The records for genealogical research are available at the state archive "Statny Archiv in Bratislava, Nitra, Slovakia"

- Roman Catholic church records (births/marriages/deaths): 1700-1894 (parish A)
- Reformated church records (births/marriages/deaths): 1792-1896 (parish A)

== See also ==
- List of municipalities and towns in Slovakia
