= Žihárec =

Žihárec Zsigárd
- Municipality
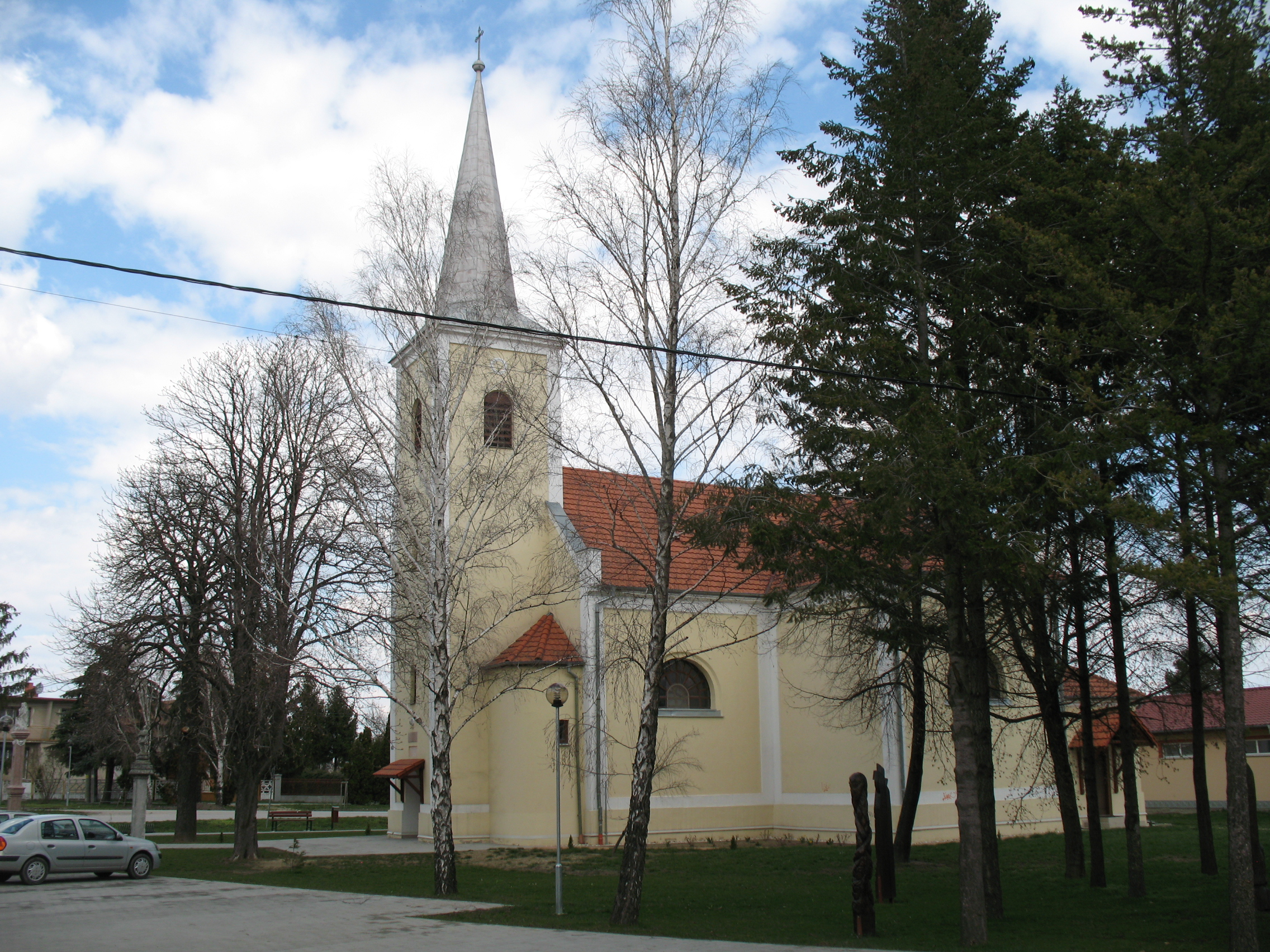
- Church of Saint Joseph

- Flag

- Location of Žihárec in the Nitra Region Location of Žihárec in Slovakia
- Coordinates: 48.07°N 17.88°E
- Country: Slovakia
- Region: Nitra Region
- District: Šaľa District
- First mentioned: 1251

Government
  - Mayor: Péter Jonás (Ind.)

Area
  - Total: 17.04 km^{2} (6.58 sq mi)
- Elevation: 111 m (364 ft)

Population (2025)
  - Total: 1,859
- Time zone: UTC+1 (CET)
  - Summer (DST): UTC+2 (CEST)
- Postal code: 925 83
- Area code: +421 31
- Vehicle registration plate (until 2022): SA
- Website: www.obecziharec.sk

Žihárec (Hungarian: Zsigárd, Hungarian pronunciation: [ˈʒiɡaːrd]) is a village and municipality in Šaľa District, in the Nitra Region of south-west Slovakia.

== Geography ==
The municipality lies at an altitude of 111 metres (364 ft) and covers an area of 17.04 km^{2} (6.58 sq mi) (2025).

== History ==
In historical records, the village was first mentioned in 1251. After the Austro-Hungarian army disintegrated in November 1918, Czechoslovak troops liberated the area, also later acknowledged internationally by the Treaty of Trianon. Between 1938 and 1945, Žihárec became occupied by Miklós Horthy's Hungary through the First Vienna Award. From 1945, until the Velvet Divorce, it was part of Czechoslovakia. Since then it has been part of Slovakia.

== Population ==
Population statistic (10 years)
Year	1995	2005	2015	2025
Count	1618	1616	1655	1859
Difference		−0.12%	+2.41%	+12.32%

Population statistic
Year	2024	2025
Count	1857	1859
Difference		+0.10%

It has a population of 1859 people (31 December 2025).

=== Ethnicity ===
Census 2021 (1+ %)
Ethnicity	Number	Fraction
Hungarian	1130	62.98%
Slovak	666	37.12%
Not found out	91	5.07%
Romani	28	1.56%
Total	1794	

In year 2021 was 1794 people by ethnicity 1130 as Hungarian, 666 as Slovak, 91 as Not found out, 28 as Romani, 4 as Other, 3 as Czech, 3 as French, 2 as Romanian, 1 as Italian, 1 as Serbian, 1 as Russian, 1 as Polish and 1 as German.

Note on population: The difference values of population numbers in the table "Population statistic" and in the sections "Ethnicity" & "Religion" is caused by the use of various statistical methods.

=== Religion ===
Census 2021 (1+ %)
Religion	Number	Fraction
Roman Catholic Church	1000	55.74%
Calvinist Church	313	17.45%
None	290	16.16%
Not found out	86	4.79%
Evangelical Church	72	4.01%
Total	1794	

In year 2021 was 1794 people by religion 1000 from Roman Catholic Church, 313 from Calvinist Church, 290 from None, 86 from Not found out, 72 from Evangelical Church, 12 from Greek Catholic Church, 9 from Other and not ascertained christian church, 3 from Christian Congregations in Slovakia, 3 from Other, 3 from Buddhism, 1 from Jehovah's Witnesses, 1 from Islam and 1 from Ad hoc movements.

According to the 2011 census, the municipality had 1,638 inhabitants. 1,079 of them were Hungarians, 512 Slovaks and 47 others were unspecified.

== Facilities ==
The village has a public library and a football pitch.
