= Tešedíkovo =

Tešedíkovo Pered
- Municipality
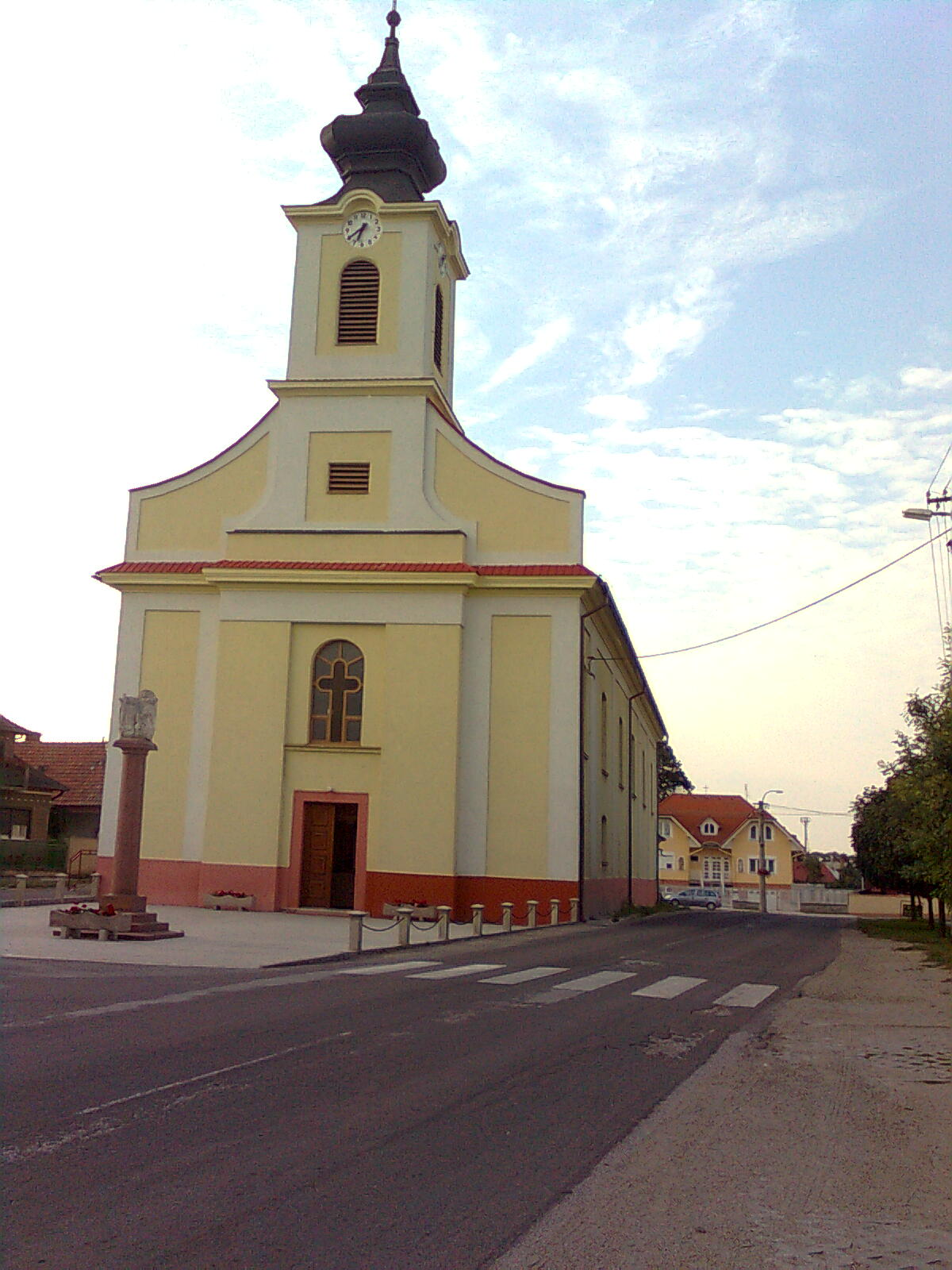
- Church of Saint John the Baptist

- Flag

- Location of Tešedíkovo in the Nitra Region Location of Tešedíkovo in Slovakia
- Coordinates: 48.11°N 17.85°E
- Country: Slovakia
- Region: Nitra Region
- District: Šaľa District
- First mentioned: 1237

Government
  - Mayor: Ildikó Kőrösi (SMK-MKP)

Area
  - Total: 22.78 km^{2} (8.80 sq mi)
- Elevation: 114 m (374 ft)

Population (2025)
  - Total: 3,609
- Time zone: UTC+1 (CET)
  - Summer (DST): UTC+2 (CEST)
- Postal code: 925 82
- Area code: +421 31
- Vehicle registration plate (until 2022): SA
- Website: www.tesedikovo.sk

Tešedíkovo (Hungarian: Pered) is a village and municipality in Šaľa District, in the Nitra Region of south-west Slovakia.

== Geography ==
The municipality lies at an altitude of 114 metres (374 ft) and covers an area of 22.78 km^{2} (8.80 sq mi) (2025).

== History ==
In historical records the village was first mentioned in 1237. After the Austro-Hungarian army disintegrated in November 1918, Czechoslovak troops occupied the area, later acknowledged internationally by the Treaty of Trianon. Between 1938 and 1945 Tešedíkovo once more became part of Miklós Horthy's Hungary through the First Vienna Award. From 1945 until the Velvet Divorce, it was part of Czechoslovakia. Since then it has been part of Slovakia.

== Population ==
Population statistic (10 years)
Year	1995	2005	2015	2025
Count	3751	3692	3738	3609
Difference		−1.57%	+1.24%	−3.45%

Population statistic
Year	2024	2025
Count	3621	3609
Difference		−0.33%

It has a population of 3609 people (31 December 2025).

=== Ethnicity ===
Census 2021 (1+ %)
Ethnicity	Number	Fraction
Hungarian	2712	72.92%
Slovak	974	26.18%
Not found out	222	5.96%
Total	3719	

In year 2021 was 3719 people by ethnicity 2712 as Hungarian, 974 as Slovak, 222 as Not found out, 10 as Romani, 9 as Czech, 5 as Vietnamese, 2 as Serbian, 1 as Irish, 1 as Ukrainian, 1 as Rusyn, 1 as Romanian, 1 as Austrian, 1 as Polish and 1 as English.

Note on population: The difference values of population numbers in the table "Population statistic" and in the sections "Ethnicity" & "Religion" is caused by the use of various statistical methods.

=== Religion ===
Census 2021 (1+ %)
Religion	Number	Fraction
Roman Catholic Church	2782	74.81%
None	465	12.5%
Not found out	192	5.16%
Evangelical Church	163	4.38%
Calvinist Church	60	1.61%
Total	3719	

In year 2021 was 3719 people by religion 2782 from Roman Catholic Church, 465 from None, 192 from Not found out, 163 from Evangelical Church, 60 from Calvinist Church, 20 from Greek Catholic Church, 14 from Christian Congregations in Slovakia, 6 from Other and not ascertained christian church, 4 from Jehovah's Witnesses, 2 from Eastern Orthodox Church, 2 from Other, 2 from United Methodist Church, 2 from Buddhism, 2 from Apostolic Church, 1 from Old Catholic Church, 1 from Islam and 1 from Ad hoc movements.

== Facilities ==
The village has a pharmacy, a public library a gym and a football pitch. It also has a cinema.
