= Neded =

Neded Negyed
- Municipality
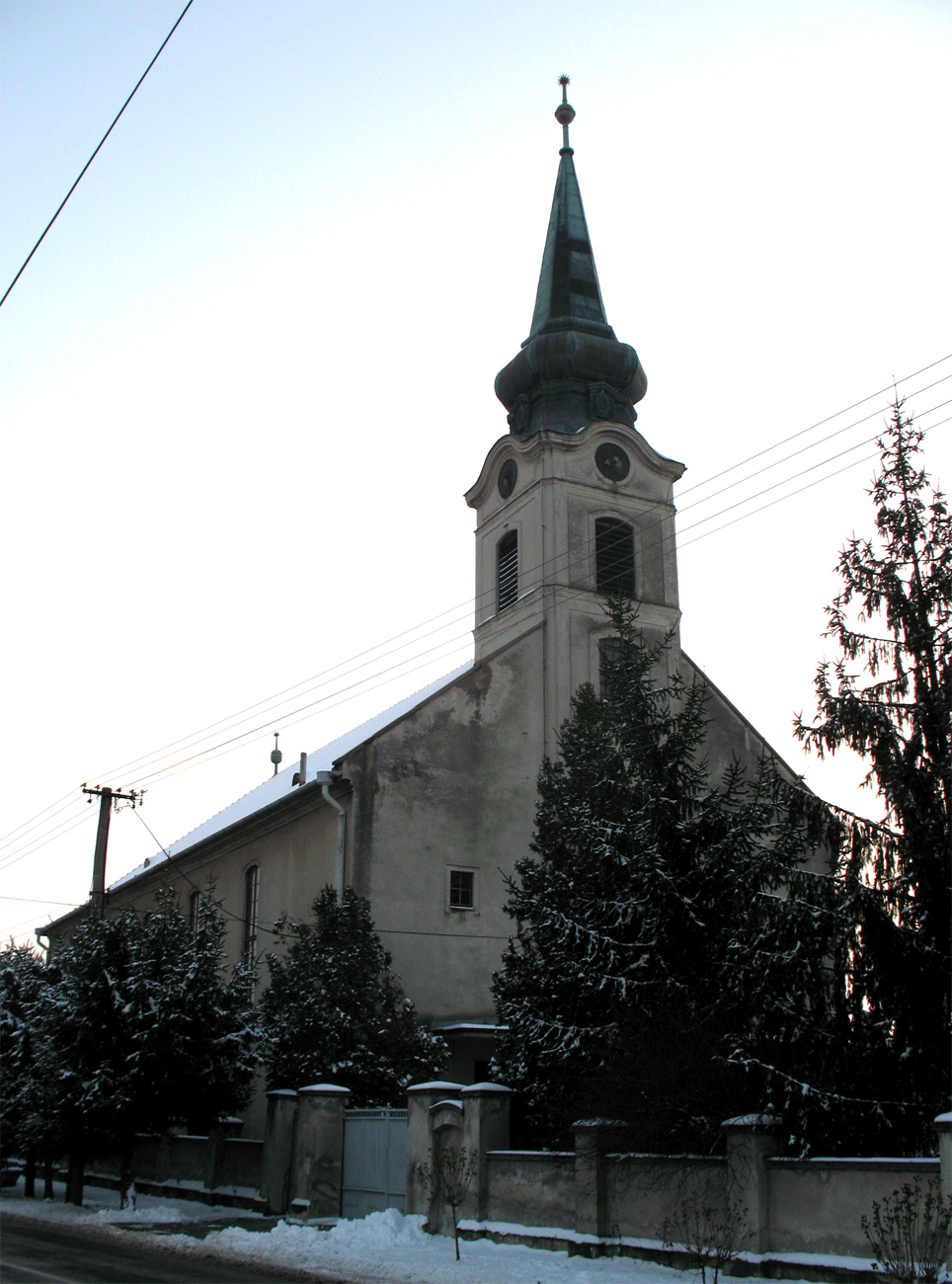
- Reformed church

- Flag

- Location of Neded in the Nitra Region Location of Neded in Slovakia
- Coordinates: 48.02°N 17.97°E
- Country: Slovakia
- Region: Nitra Region
- District: Šaľa District
- First mentioned: 1113

Government
  - Mayor: Henrieta Selmécziová

Area
  - Total: 36.00 km^{2} (13.90 sq mi)
- Elevation: 111 m (364 ft)

Population (2025)
  - Total: 3,151
- Time zone: UTC+1 (CET)
  - Summer (DST): UTC+2 (CEST)
- Postal code: 925 85
- Area code: +421 31
- Vehicle registration plate (until 2022): SA
- Website: www.neded.sk

Neded (Hungarian: Negyed) is a village and municipality in Šaľa District, in the Nitra Region of south-west Slovakia.

== Geography ==
The municipality lies at an altitude of 111 metres (364 ft) and covers an area of 36.00 km^{2} (13.90 sq mi) (2025).

== History ==
In historical records the village was first mentioned in 1113. After the Austro-Hungarian army disintegrated in November 1918, Czechoslovak troops occupied the area, later acknowledged internationally by the Treaty of Trianon. Between 1938 and 1945 Neded once more became part of Miklós Horthy's Hungary through the First Vienna Award. From 1945 until the Velvet Divorce, it was part of Czechoslovakia. Since then it has been part of Slovakia.

== Population ==
Population statistic (10 years)
Year	1995	2005	2015	2025
Count	3156	3115	3303	3151
Difference		−1.29%	+6.03%	−4.60%

Population statistic
Year	2024	2025
Count	3174	3151
Difference		−0.72%

It has a population of 3151 people (31 December 2025).

=== Ethnicity ===
Census 2021 (1+ %)
Ethnicity	Number	Fraction
Hungarian	1730	53.81%
Slovak	1402	43.6%
Not found out	147	4.57%
Romani	106	3.29%
Total	3215	

In year 2021 was 3215 people by ethnicity 1730 as Hungarian, 1402 as Slovak, 147 as Not found out, 106 as Romani, 12 as Czech, 4 as Other, 3 as Rusyn, 2 as Ukrainian, 1 as Serbian, 1 as Russian, 1 as Austrian, 1 as Polish and 1 as Moravian.

Note on population: The difference values of population numbers in the table "Population statistic" and in the sections "Ethnicity" & "Religion" is caused by the use of various statistical methods.

=== Religion ===
Census 2021 (1+ %)
Religion	Number	Fraction
Roman Catholic Church	1475	45.88%
None	697	21.68%
Calvinist Church	620	19.28%
Evangelical Church	224	6.97%
Not found out	121	3.76%
Total	3215	

In year 2021 was 3215 people by religion 1475 from Roman Catholic Church, 697 from None, 620 from Calvinist Church, 224 from Evangelical Church, 121 from Not found out, 31 from Greek Catholic Church, 9 from Jehovah's Witnesses, 8 from Ad hoc movements, 7 from Christian Congregations in Slovakia, 6 from Other and not ascertained christian church, 4 from United Methodist Church, 3 from Buddhism, 2 from Old Catholic Church, 2 from Eastern Orthodox Church, 2 from Other, 1 from Hinduism, 1 from Church of the Brethren, 1 from Baptists Church and 1 from Apostolic Church.

According to the 2011 census, the municipality had 3,301 inhabitants. 1,820 of inhabitants were Hungarians, 1,241 Slovaks, 103 Roma and 137 others and unspecified.

== Facilities ==
The village has a public library, car wash, and a gym.
