= Dlhá nad Váhom =

Dlhá nad Váhom Vághosszúfalu
- Municipality
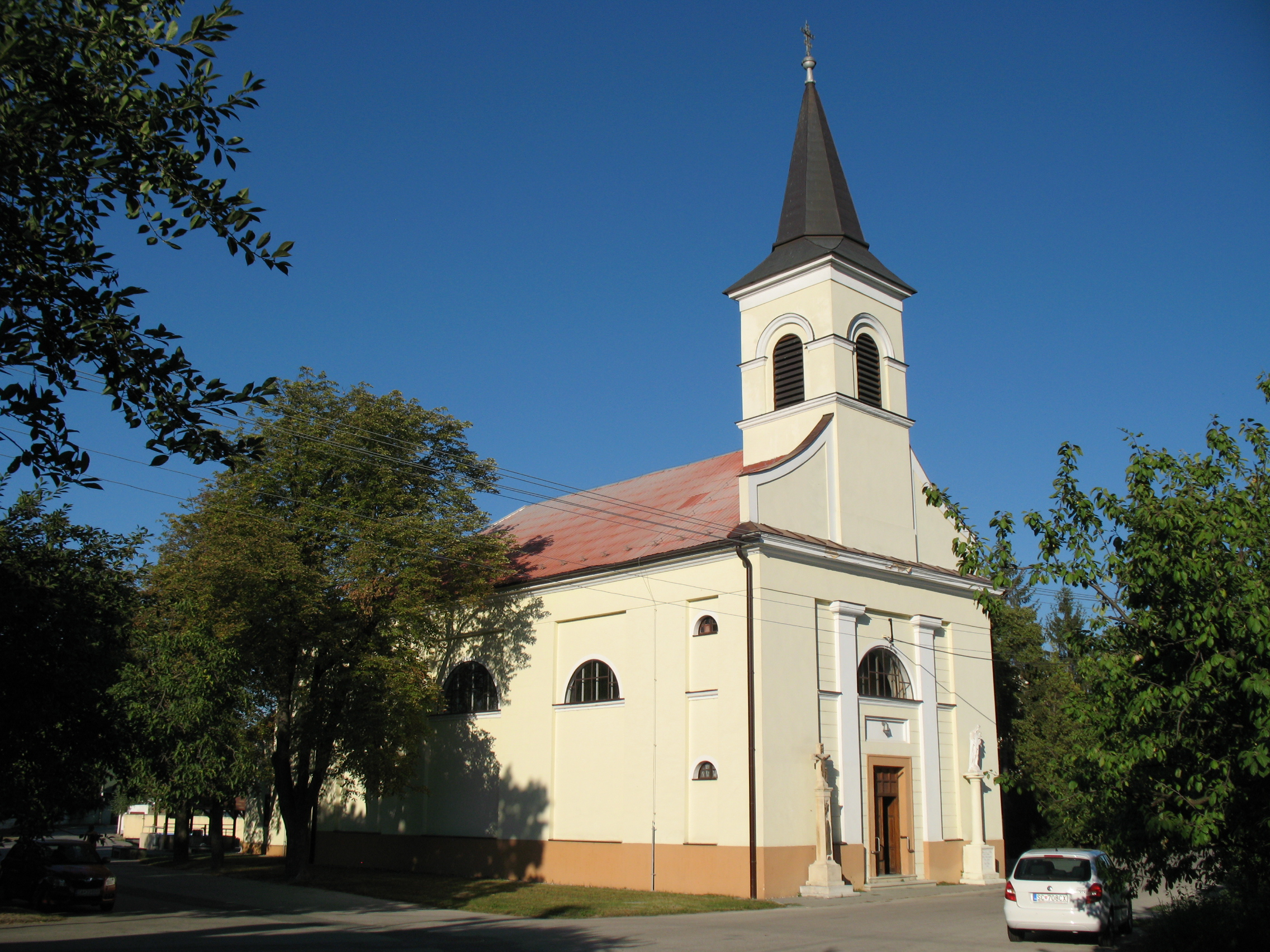
- Church of Holy Trinity

- Flag

- Location of Dlhá nad Váhom in the Nitra Region Location of Dlhá nad Váhom in Slovakia
- Coordinates: 48.17°N 17.86°E
- Country: Slovakia
- Region: Nitra Region
- District: Šaľa District
- First mentioned: 1113

Government
  - Mayor: Mgr. Bálint Mészáros

Area
  - Total: 9.06 km^{2} (3.50 sq mi)
- Elevation: 115 m (377 ft)

Population (2025)
  - Total: 922
- Time zone: UTC+1 (CET)
  - Summer (DST): UTC+2 (CEST)
- Postal code: 927 05
- Area code: +421 31
- Vehicle registration plate (until 2022): SA
- Website: dlhanadvahom.eu

Dlhá nad Váhom (Hungarian: Vághosszúfalu) is a village and municipality in Šaľa District, in the Nitra Region of southwest Slovakia.

== Geography ==
The municipality lies at an altitude of 115 metres (377 ft) and covers an area of 9.06 km^{2} (3.50 sq mi) (2025).

== History ==
In historical records the village was first mentioned in 1113. After the Austro-Hungarian army disintegrated in November 1918, Czechoslovak troops occupied the area, later acknowledged internationally by the Treaty of Trianon. Between 1938 and 1945 Dlhá nad Váhom once more became part of Miklós Horthy's Hungary through the First Vienna Award. From 1945 until the Velvet Divorce, it was part of Czechoslovakia. Since then it has been part of Slovakia.

== Population ==
Population statistic (10 years)
Year	1995	2005	2015	2025
Count	887	897	863	922
Difference		+1.12%	−3.79%	+6.83%

Population statistic
Year	2024	2025
Count	925	922
Difference		−0.32%

It has a population of 922 people (31 December 2025).

=== Ethnicity ===
Census 2021 (1+ %)
Ethnicity	Number	Fraction
Hungarian	488	53.45%
Slovak	431	47.2%
Not found out	24	2.62%
Total	913	

In year 2021 was 913 people by ethnicity 488 as Hungarian, 431 as Slovak, 24 as Not found out, 7 as Czech, 4 as Other, 3 as German, 2 as Jewish, 2 as Italian and 2 as Rusyn.

Note on population: The difference values of population numbers in the table "Population statistic" and in the sections "Ethnicity" & "Religion" is caused by the use of various statistical methods.

=== Religion ===
Census 2021 (1+ %)
Religion	Number	Fraction
Roman Catholic Church	640	70.1%
None	203	22.23%
Not found out	18	1.97%
Calvinist Church	13	1.42%
Evangelical Church	11	1.2%
Total	913	

In year 2021 was 913 people by religion 640 from Roman Catholic Church, 203 from None, 18 from Not found out, 13 from Calvinist Church, 11 from Evangelical Church, 5 from Eastern Orthodox Church, 4 from Other, 4 from Greek Catholic Church, 3 from Other and not ascertained christian church, 3 from Jehovah's Witnesses, 3 from United Methodist Church, 2 from Jewish community, 2 from Buddhism, 1 from Christian Congregations in Slovakia and 1 from Ad hoc movements.

== Facilities ==
The village has a public library and a football pitch.

== Genealogical resources ==
The records for genealogical research are available at the state archive "Statny Archiv in Bratislava, Nitra, Slovakia"

- Roman Catholic church records (births/marriages/deaths): 1693-1890 (parish A)

== See also ==
- List of municipalities and towns in Slovakia
