= Radošovce =

Radošovce may refer to several places in Slovakia notably in the Trnava Region.

- Radošovce, Skalica District
- Radošovce, Trnava District
