= Biely Kostol =

- Municipality
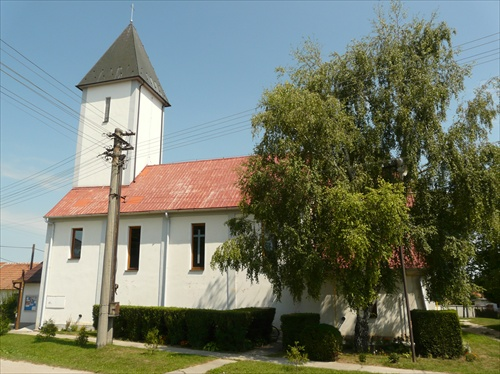

- Flag

- Location of Biely Kostol in the Trnava Region Location of Biely Kostol in Slovakia
- Coordinates: 48.37°N 17.53°E
- Country: Slovakia
- Region: Trnava Region
- District: Trnava District
- First mentioned: 1332

Area
  - Total: 2.41 km^{2} (0.93 sq mi)
- Elevation: 153 m (502 ft)

Population (2025)
  - Total: 2,581
- Time zone: UTC+1 (CET)
  - Summer (DST): UTC+2 (CEST)
- Postal code: 917 07
- Area code: +421 33
- Vehicle registration plate (until 2022): TT
- Website: www.bielykostol.sk

Biely Kostol (meaning "White Church") (Hungarian: Pozsonyfehéregyház) is a village and municipality of Trnava District in the Trnava region of Slovakia. As of the 2018 census, the population was 2,113, with the sex ratio being 50.8% male & 49.2% female.

== Geography ==
The municipality lies at an altitude of 153 metres (502 ft) and covers an area of 2.41 km^{2} (0.93 sq mi) (2025).

== Climate ==
Biely Kostol has a Marine west coast, warm summer climate (Classification: Cfb).

Climate data for Biely Kostol
Month	Jan	Feb	Mar	Apr	May	Jun	Jul	Aug	Sep	Oct	Nov	Dec	Year
Mean daily maximum °C (°F)	1.7 (35.1)	4.2 (39.6)	11.1 (52.0)	17.4 (63.3)	20.8 (69.4)	25.7 (78.3)	28.4 (83.1)	29.0 (84.2)	22.9 (73.2)	16.0 (60.8)	9.6 (49.3)	3.5 (38.3)	15.9 (60.5)
Mean daily minimum °C (°F)	−3.5 (25.7)	−1.9 (28.6)	2.4 (36.3)	6.1 (43.0)	9.4 (48.9)	13.7 (56.7)	15.6 (60.1)	16.2 (61.2)	12.1 (53.8)	7.5 (45.5)	3.4 (38.1)	−1.3 (29.7)	6.6 (44.0)
Average precipitation cm (inches)	8 (3.1)	6 (2.4)	5 (2.0)	6 (2.4)	13 (5.1)	11 (4.3)	9 (3.5)	6 (2.4)	9 (3.5)	7 (2.8)	6 (2.4)	6 (2.4)	92 (36.3)
Source: Weather and climate

== Population ==
Population statistic (10 years)
Year	1995	2005	2015	2025
Count	1085	1186	1681	2581
Difference		+9.30%	+41.73%	+53.53%

Population statistic
Year	2024	2025
Count	2553	2581
Difference		+1.09%

It has a population of 2581 people (31 December 2025).

=== Ethnicity ===
Census 2021 (1+ %)
Ethnicity	Number	Fraction
Slovak	2176	91.58%
Not found out	153	6.43%
Total	2376	

In year 2021 was 2376 people by ethnicity 2176 as Slovak, 153 as Not found out, 18 as Czech, 14 as Vietnamese, 13 as Ukrainian, 13 as Rusyn, 12 as Hungarian, 10 as Other, 6 as Russian, 3 as Turkish, 3 as Italian, 3 as Serbian, 2 as Croatian, 2 as Bulgarian, 1 as Jewish, 1 as Romanian, 1 as German and 1 as French.

Note on population: The difference values of population numbers in the table "Population statistic" and in the sections "Ethnicity" & "Religion" is caused by the use of various statistical methods.

=== Religion ===
Census 2021 (1+ %)
Religion	Number	Fraction
Roman Catholic Church	1391	58.54%
None	693	29.17%
Not found out	142	5.98%
Evangelical Church	49	2.06%
Greek Catholic Church	26	1.09%
Total	2376	

In year 2021 was 2376 people by religion 1391 from Roman Catholic Church, 693 from None, 142 from Not found out, 49 from Evangelical Church, 26 from Greek Catholic Church, 14 from Eastern Orthodox Church, 11 from Christian Congregations in Slovakia, 10 from Jehovah's Witnesses, 10 from Other, 8 from Ad hoc movements, 6 from Other and not ascertained christian church, 4 from Calvinist Church, 3 from Islam, 2 from Old Catholic Church, 2 from Buddhism, 2 from Bahá'i Community, 1 from Jewish community, 1 from Hinduism and 1 from Apostolic Church.

== See also ==
- List of municipalities and towns in Slovakia

== Genealogical resources ==
The records for genealogical research are available at the state archive "Statny Archiv in Bratislava, Slovakia"

- Roman Catholic church records (births/marriages/deaths): 1708-1899 (parish B)
