= Igor Bališ =

Slovak footballer

Personal information
- Date of birth: 5 January 1970 (age 56)
- Place of birth: Križovany nad Dudváhom, Czechoslovakia
- Height: 1.83 m (6 ft 0 in)
- Positions: Right back; right winger

Youth career
- Spartak Trnava

Senior career*
Years	Team	Apps	(Gls)
1988–1999	Spartak Trnava	242	(11)
1999–2000	Slovan Bratislava	15	(0)
2000–2003	West Bromwich Albion	69	(4)
2003	DAC Dunajská Streda	0	(0)
Total		326	(15)

International career
1995–2001	Slovakia	41	(1)
- * Club domestic league appearances and goals

Igor Bališ (born 5 January 1970) is a Slovak former footballer. He played for West Bromwich Albion in England. Bališ played club football in Slovakia for Spartak Trnava and Slovan Bratislava, making a combined 257 appearances, as well as the Slovakia national team at international level.

== Career ==
Bališ made a combined total of 257 appearances for Slovak sides Spartak Trnava and Slovan Bratislava between 1988 and 2000. In 1997 he finished fifth in voting for footballer of the year at the Slovak Footballer of the Year Awards behind winner Dušan Tittel. In February 2000 Bališ scored his only international goal, scoring from a left-footed shot in the 5th minute of a 2–0 away victory against Chile in the Copa Ciudad de Valparaíso.

Bališ joined West Bromwich Albion in November 2000 for a fee of £150,000. He made his Albion debut on 23 December 2000, coming on as a late substitute in a 3–0 victory against Nottingham Forest. Bališ converted a dramatic stoppage time penalty against Bradford City in the penultimate game of the 2001–02 season, which put Albion on the brink of promotion to the Premier League.

After completing a season in the Premiership with Albion, Bališ quit the club and returned to Slovakia due to a recurrence of tinnitus. He signed for DAC Dunajská Streda but left the club without making an appearance, subsequently moving to Austria, where he played in the lower leagues.
