= Košolná =

- Municipality
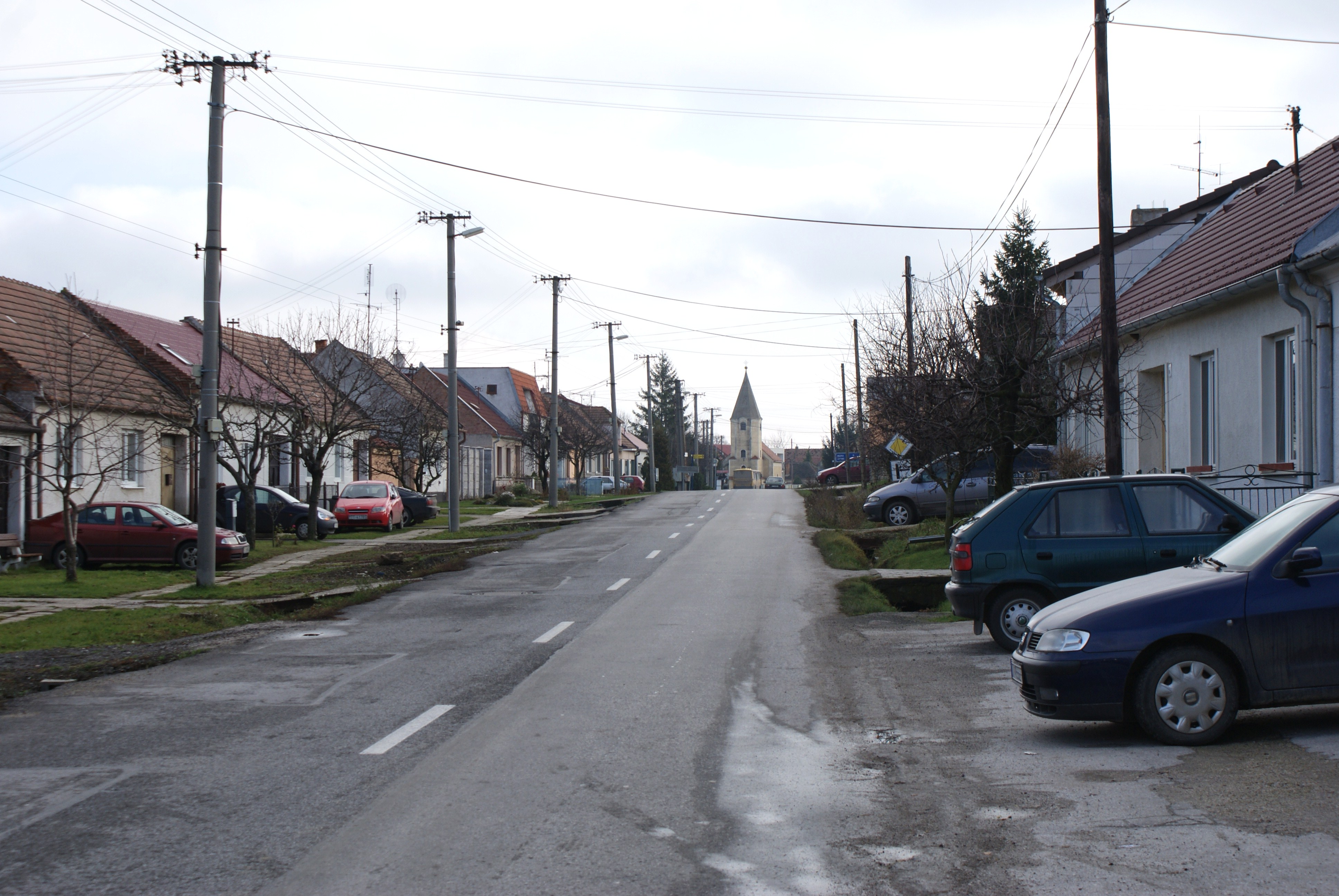

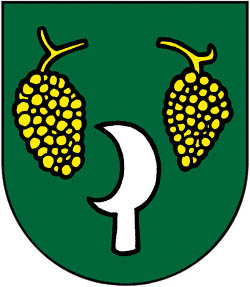
- Flag Coat of arms

- Location of Košolná in the Trnava Region Location of Košolná in Slovakia
- Coordinates: 48.42°N 17.47°E
- Country: Slovakia
- Region: Trnava Region
- District: Trnava District
- First mentioned: 1296

Area
  - Total: 9.58 km^{2} (3.70 sq mi)
- Elevation: 180 m (590 ft)

Population (2025)
  - Total: 877
- Time zone: UTC+1 (CET)
  - Summer (DST): UTC+2 (CEST)
- Postal code: 919 01
- Area code: +421 33
- Vehicle registration plate (until 2022): TT
- Website: www.kosolna.eu.sk

Košolná (Hungarian: Gósfalva) is a village and municipality of Trnava District in the Trnava Region of Slovakia.

== Geography ==
The municipality lies at an altitude of 180 metres (590 ft) and covers an area of 9.58 km^{2} (3.70 sq mi) (2025).

== Population ==
Population statistic (10 years)
Year	1995	2005	2015	2025
Count	625	676	791	877
Difference		+8.16%	+17.01%	+10.87%

Population statistic
Year	2024	2025
Count	854	877
Difference		+2.69%

It has a population of 877 people (31 December 2025).

=== Ethnicity ===
Census 2021 (1+ %)
Ethnicity	Number	Fraction
Slovak	804	97.57%
Not found out	17	2.06%
Total	824	

In year 2021 was 824 people by ethnicity 804 as Slovak, 17 as Not found out, 4 as Czech, 2 as Rusyn, 2 as Hungarian, 1 as Vietnamese, 1 as Romani, 1 as Russian and 1 as German.

Note on population: The difference values of population numbers in the table "Population statistic" and in the sections "Ethnicity" & "Religion" is caused by the use of various statistical methods.

=== Religion ===
Census 2021 (1+ %)
Religion	Number	Fraction
Roman Catholic Church	579	70.27%
None	188	22.82%
Not found out	19	2.31%
Evangelical Church	15	1.82%
Total	824	

In year 2021 was 824 people by religion 579 from Roman Catholic Church, 188 from None, 19 from Not found out, 15 from Evangelical Church, 6 from Greek Catholic Church, 4 from Christian Congregations in Slovakia, 3 from Other, 3 from Buddhism, 3 from Ad hoc movements, 1 from Calvinist Church, 1 from United Methodist Church, 1 from Seventh-day Adventist Church and 1 from Bahá'i Community.

== Genealogical resources ==
The records for genealogical research are available at the state archive "Statny Archiv in Bratislava, Slovakia"

- Roman Catholic church records (births/marriages/deaths): 1776-1896 (parish B)

== See also ==
- List of municipalities and towns in Slovakia
