= Horné Dubové =

- Municipality
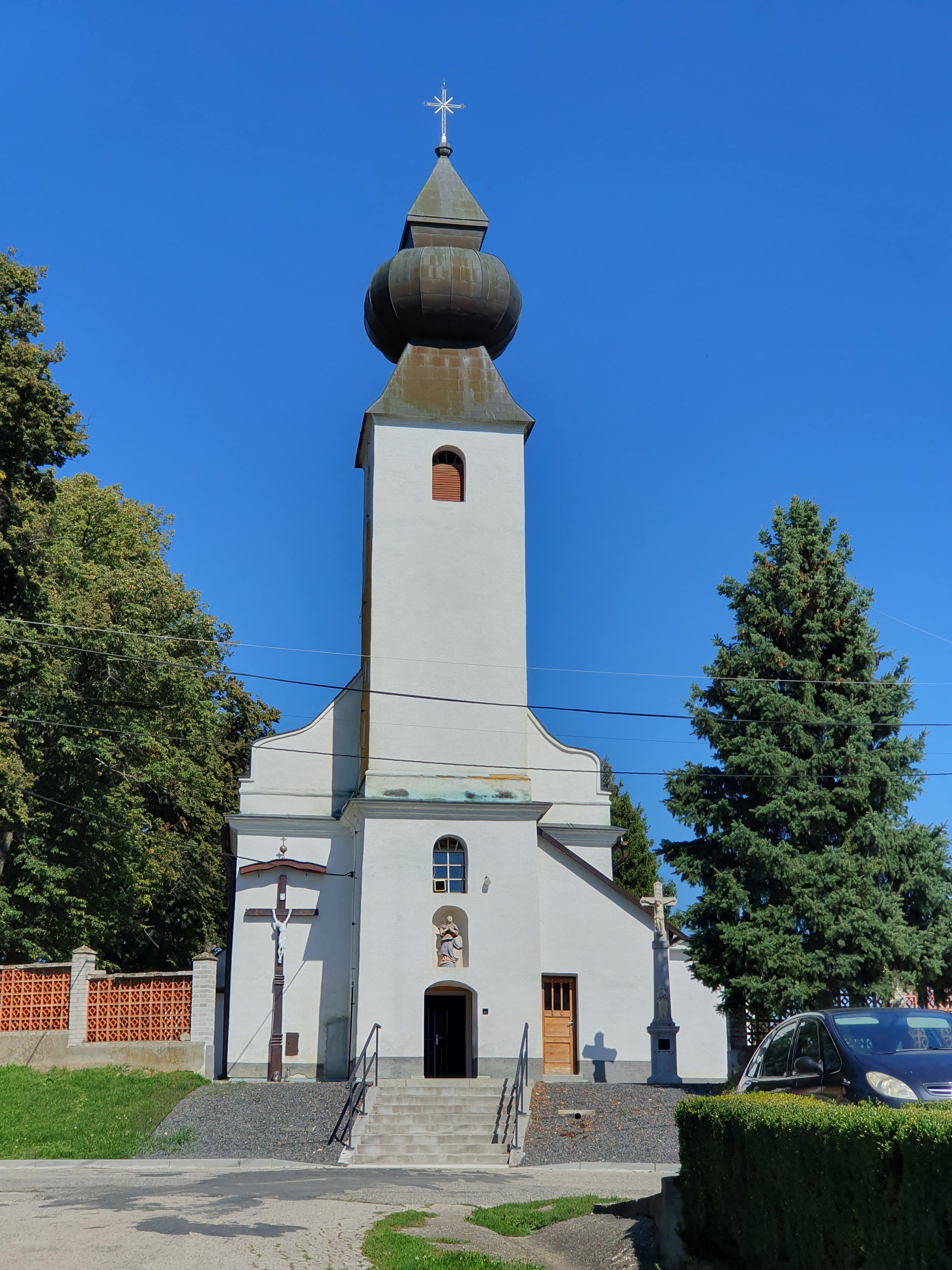

- Flag

- Location of Horné Dubové in the Trnava Region Location of Horné Dubové in Slovakia
- Coordinates: 48.52°N 17.57°E
- Country: Slovakia
- Region: Trnava Region
- District: Trnava District
- First mentioned: 1262

Area
  - Total: 7.27 km^{2} (2.81 sq mi)
- Elevation: 219 m (719 ft)

Population (2025)
  - Total: 348
- Time zone: UTC+1 (CET)
  - Summer (DST): UTC+2 (CEST)
- Postal code: 919 06
- Area code: +421 33
- Vehicle registration plate (until 2022): TT
- Website: www.hornedubove.sk

Horné Dubové (Hungarian: Felsődombó) is a village and municipality of Trnava District in the Trnava region of Slovakia.

== Geography ==
The municipality lies at an altitude of 219 metres (719 ft) and covers an area of 7.27 km^{2} (2.81 sq mi) (2025).

== Population ==
Population statistic (10 years)
Year	1995	2005	2015	2025
Count	383	365	385	348
Difference		−4.69%	+5.47%	−9.61%

Population statistic
Year	2024	2025
Count	353	348
Difference		−1.41%

It has a population of 348 people (31 December 2025).

=== Ethnicity ===
Census 2021 (1+ %)
Ethnicity	Number	Fraction
Slovak	359	97.28%
Not found out	9	2.43%
Total	369	

In year 2021 was 369 people by ethnicity 359 as Slovak, 9 as Not found out, 2 as Russian, 2 as Hungarian, 1 as Serbian and 1 as Other.

Note on population: The difference values of population numbers in the table "Population statistic" and in the sections "Ethnicity" & "Religion" is caused by the use of various statistical methods.

=== Religion ===
Census 2021 (1+ %)
Religion	Number	Fraction
Roman Catholic Church	284	76.96%
None	66	17.89%
Not found out	8	2.17%
Evangelical Church	4	1.08%
Total	369	

In year 2021 was 369 people by religion 284 from Roman Catholic Church, 66 from None, 8 from Not found out, 4 from Evangelical Church, 3 from Other, 1 from Eastern Orthodox Church, 1 from Christian Congregations in Slovakia, 1 from Greek Catholic Church and 1 from Ad hoc movements.

== Genealogical resources ==
The records for genealogical research are available at the state archive "Statny Archiv in Bratislava, Slovakia"

- Roman Catholic church records (births/marriages/deaths): 1755-1896 (parish B)

== See also ==
- List of municipalities and towns in Slovakia
