= Majcichov =

- Municipality
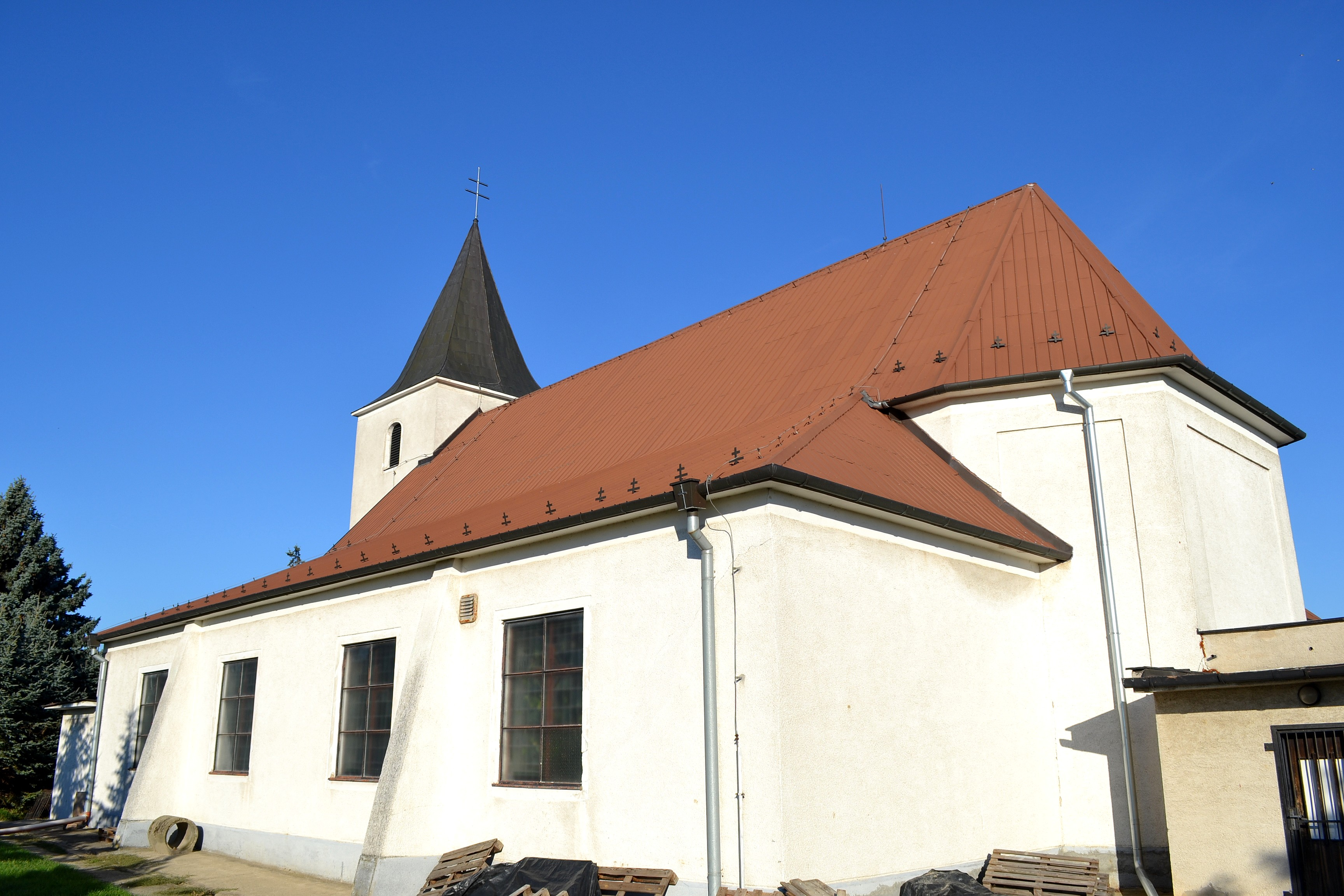

- Flag

- Location of Majcichov in the Trnava Region Location of Majcichov in Slovakia
- Coordinates: 48.28°N 17.63°E
- Country: Slovakia
- Region: Trnava Region
- District: Trnava District
- First mentioned: 1266

Area
  - Total: 18.19 km^{2} (7.02 sq mi)
- Elevation: 136 m (446 ft)

Population (2025)
  - Total: 2,176
- Time zone: UTC+1 (CET)
  - Summer (DST): UTC+2 (CEST)
- Postal code: 919 22
- Area code: +421 33
- Vehicle registration plate (until 2022): TT
- Website: www.majcichov.sk

Majcichov (Hungarian: Majtény) is a village and municipality of Trnava District in the Trnava region of Slovakia.

== Geography ==
The municipality lies at an altitude of 136 metres (446 ft) and covers an area of 18.19 km^{2} (7.02 sq mi) (2025).

== Population ==
Population statistic (10 years)
Year	1995	2005	2015	2025
Count	1847	1861	1918	2176
Difference		+0.75%	+3.06%	+13.45%

Population statistic
Year	2024	2025
Count	2181	2176
Difference		−0.22%

It has a population of 2176 people (31 December 2025).

=== Ethnicity ===
Census 2021 (1+ %)
Ethnicity	Number	Fraction
Slovak	2112	97.64%
Total	2163	

In year 2021 was 2163 people by ethnicity 2112 as Slovak, 16 as Not found out, 14 as Hungarian, 10 as Czech, 9 as Ukrainian, 5 as Other, 4 as Russian, 4 as Moravian, 2 as Rusyn, 2 as Romanian, 2 as Polish, 2 as German, 2 as Korean, 2 as English, 1 as Italian, 1 as Romani, 1 as French and 1 as Bulgarian.

Note on population: The difference values of population numbers in the table "Population statistic" and in the sections "Ethnicity" & "Religion" is caused by the use of various statistical methods.

=== Religion ===
Census 2021 (1+ %)
Religion	Number	Fraction
Roman Catholic Church	1690	78.13%
None	365	16.87%
Evangelical Church	30	1.39%
Total	2163	

In year 2021 was 2163 people by religion 1690 from Roman Catholic Church, 365 from None, 30 from Evangelical Church, 18 from Greek Catholic Church, 14 from Not found out, 13 from Christian Congregations in Slovakia, 11 from Eastern Orthodox Church, 8 from Ad hoc movements, 5 from Other and not ascertained christian church, 4 from Other, 2 from Calvinist Church, 2 from Buddhism and 1 from Jewish community.
