= Dolné Orešany =

- Municipality
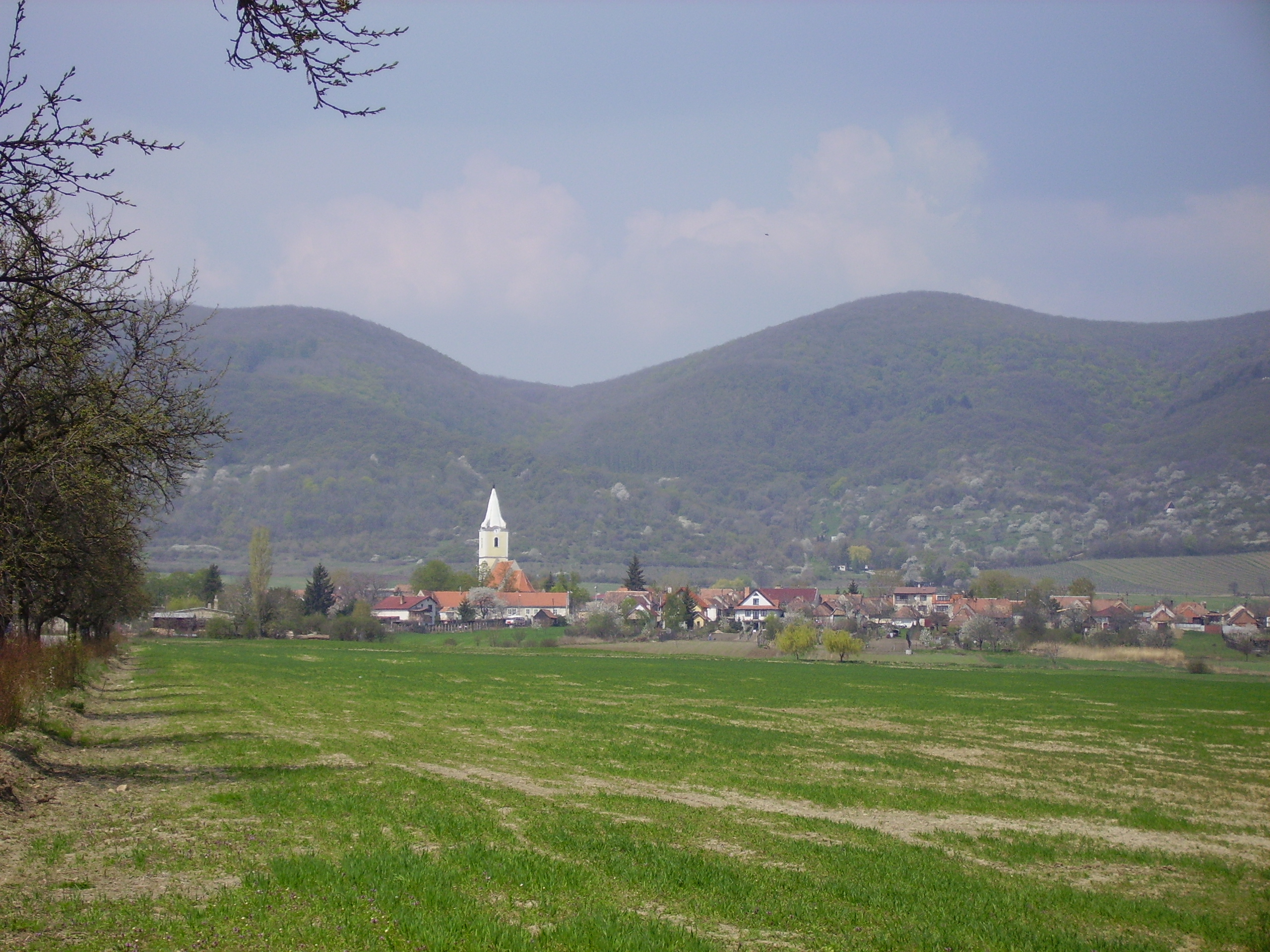

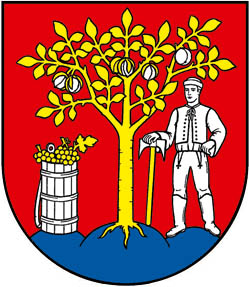
- Flag Coat of arms

- Location of Dolné Orešany in the Trnava Region Location of Dolné Orešany in Slovakia
- Coordinates: 48.44°N 17.43°E
- Country: Slovakia
- Region: Trnava Region
- District: Trnava District
- First mentioned: 1235

Government
  - Mayor: Juliana Belicová

Area
  - Total: 17.89 km^{2} (6.91 sq mi)
- Elevation: 200 m (660 ft)

Population (2025)
  - Total: 1,441
- Time zone: UTC+1 (CET)
  - Summer (DST): UTC+2 (CEST)
- Postal code: 919 02
- Area code: +421 33
- Vehicle registration plate (until 2022): TT
- Website: www.dolneoresany.sk

Dolné Orešany (Hungarian: Alsódiós) is a village and municipality of Trnava District in the Trnava region of Slovakia.

== Geography ==
The municipality lies at an altitude of 200 metres (660 ft) and covers an area of 17.89 km^{2} (6.91 sq mi) (2025).

== Population ==
Population statistic (10 years)
Year	1995	2005	2015	2025
Count	1194	1219	1266	1441
Difference		+2.09%	+3.85%	+13.82%

Population statistic
Year	2024	2025
Count	1430	1441
Difference		+0.76%

It has a population of 1441 people (31 December 2025).

=== Ethnicity ===
Census 2021 (1+ %)
Ethnicity	Number	Fraction
Slovak	1331	97.93%
Not found out	24	1.76%
Czech	16	1.17%
Total	1359	

In year 2021 was 1359 people by ethnicity 1331 as Slovak, 24 as Not found out, 16 as Czech, 3 as Romani, 2 as German, 2 as Moravian, 2 as Hungarian, 2 as Other, 1 as Jewish, 1 as Ukrainian, 1 as Silesian, 1 as Romanian and 1 as Polish.

Note on population: The difference values of population numbers in the table "Population statistic" and in the sections "Ethnicity" & "Religion" is caused by the use of various statistical methods.

=== Religion ===
Census 2021 (1+ %)
Religion	Number	Fraction
Roman Catholic Church	978	71.96%
None	291	21.41%
Not found out	28	2.06%
Evangelical Church	15	1.1%
Total	1359	

In year 2021 was 1359 people by religion 978 from Roman Catholic Church, 291 from None, 28 from Not found out, 15 from Evangelical Church, 8 from Paganism and natural spirituality, 8 from Greek Catholic Church, 7 from Christian Congregations in Slovakia, 4 from Eastern Orthodox Church, 4 from Church of the Brethren, 3 from Calvinist Church, 3 from Other and not ascertained christian church, 3 from United Methodist Church, 3 from Baptists Church, 1 from Jewish community, 1 from Jehovah's Witnesses, 1 from Hinduism and 1 from Ad hoc movements.

== Gallery ==
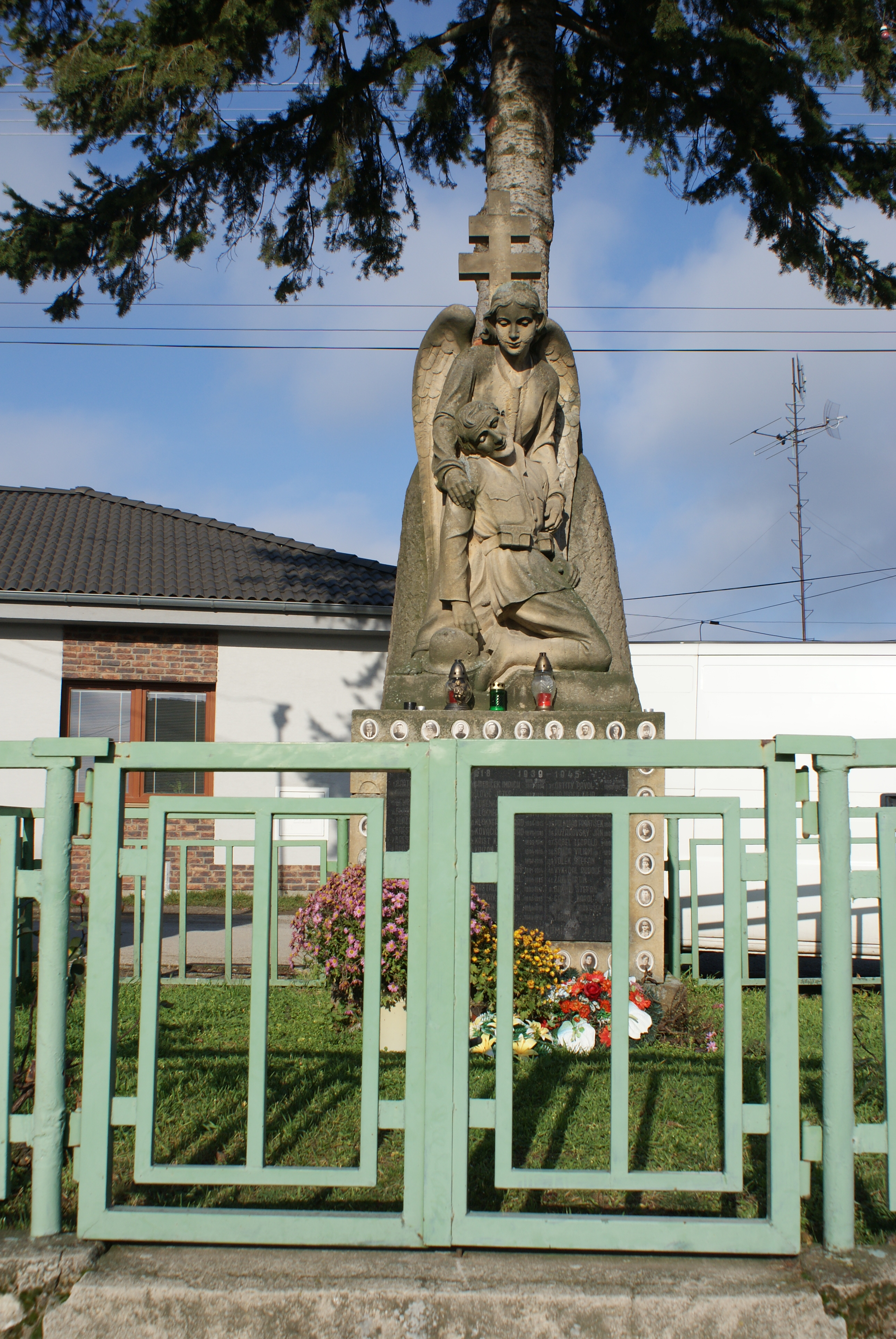
World War I and World War II Memorial

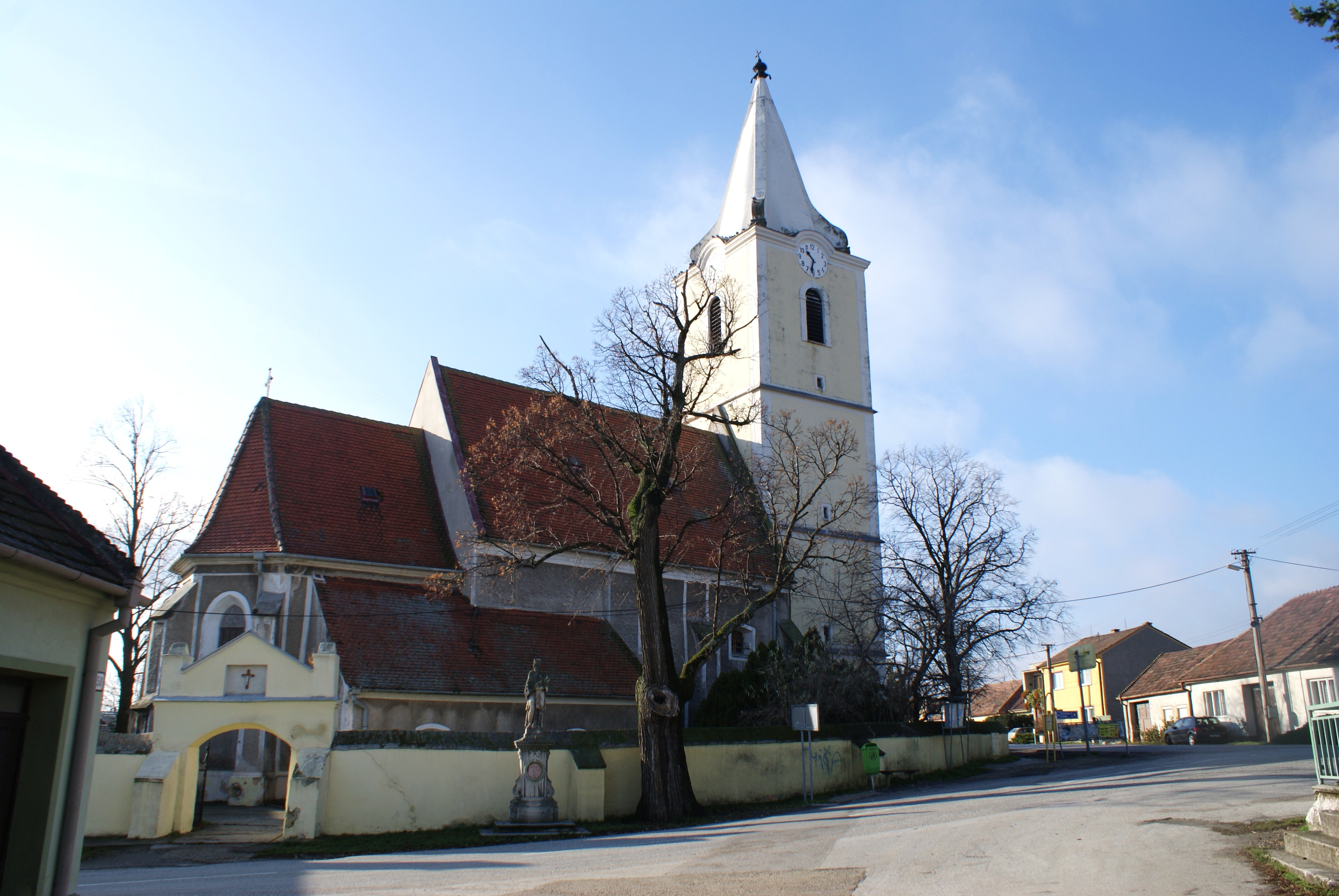
Dolné Orešany Church

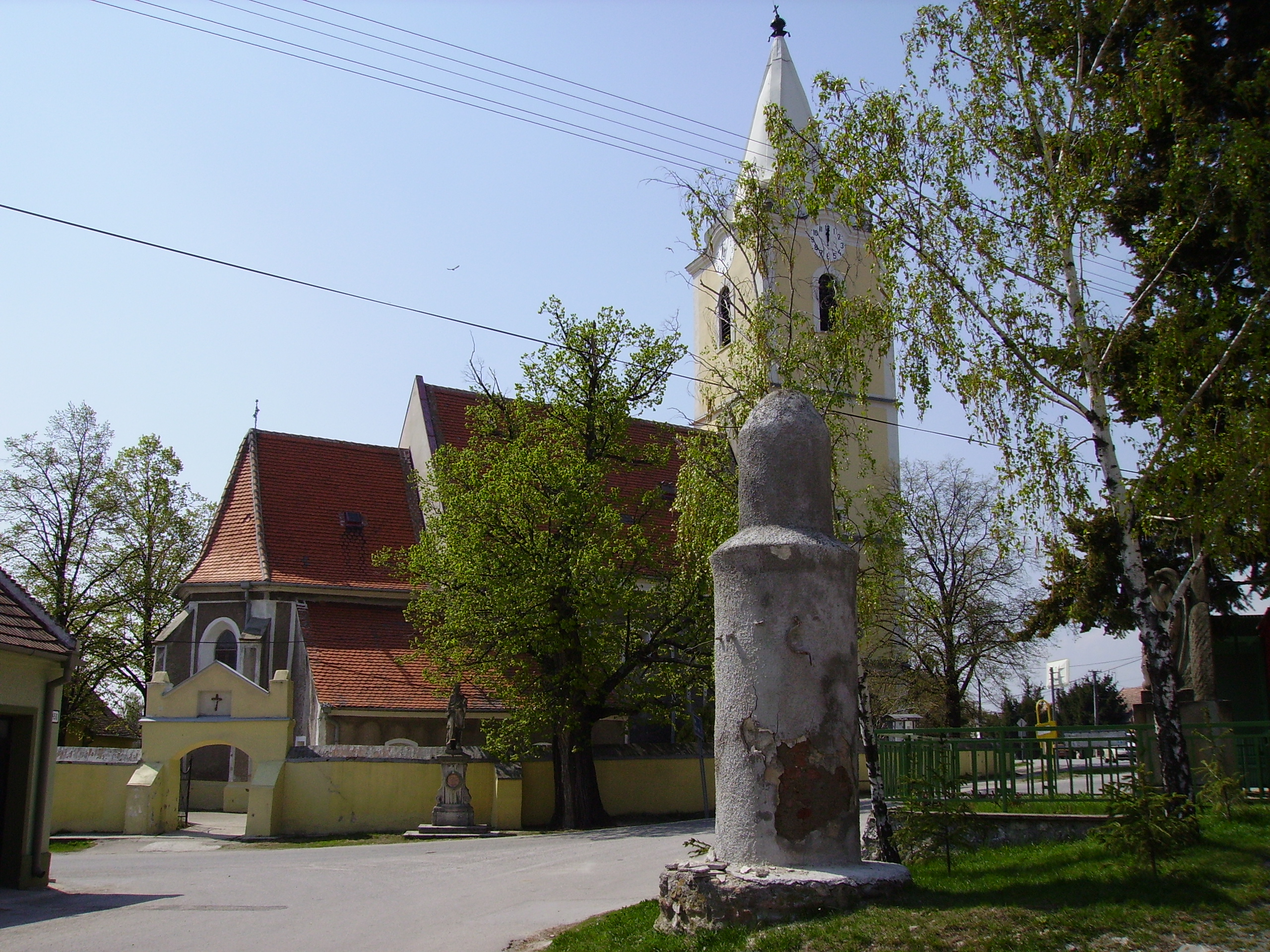
Dolné Orešany Church

== See also ==
- List of municipalities and towns in Slovakia

== Genealogical resources ==
The records for genealogical research are available at the state archive "Statny Archiv in Bratislava, Slovakia"

- Roman Catholic church records (births/marriages/deaths): 1695-1895 (parish A)
- Lutheran church records (births/marriages/deaths): 1666-1895 (parish B)
