= Špačince =

- Municipality
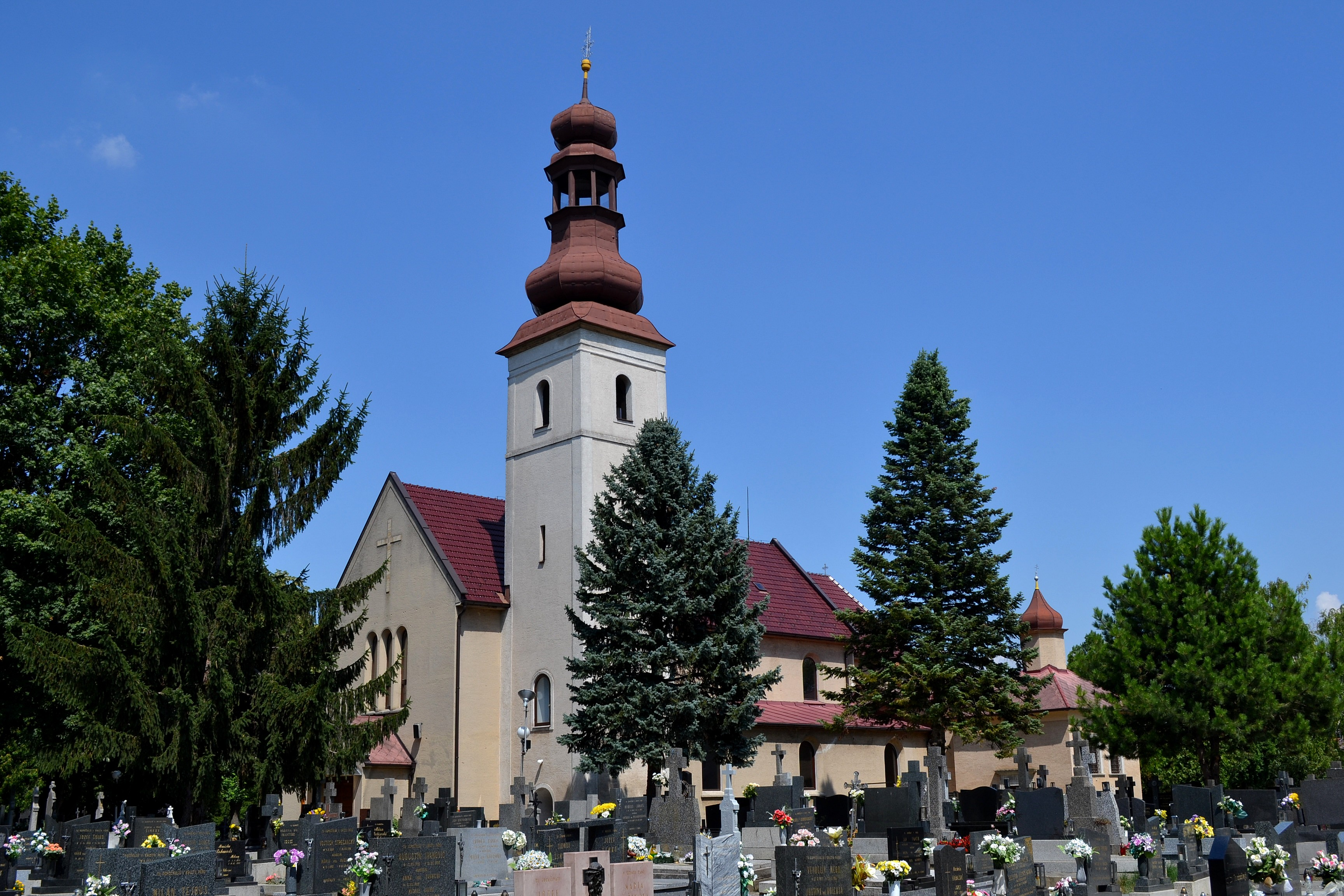

- Flag

- Location of Špačince in the Trnava Region Location of Špačince in Slovakia
- Coordinates: 48.43°N 17.62°E
- Country: Slovakia
- Region: Trnava Region
- District: Trnava District
- First mentioned: 1275

Area
  - Total: 22.10 km^{2} (8.53 sq mi)
- Elevation: 158 m (518 ft)

Population (2025)
  - Total: 3,370
- Time zone: UTC+1 (CET)
  - Summer (DST): UTC+2 (CEST)
- Postal code: 919 51
- Area code: +421 33
- Vehicle registration plate (until 2022): TT
- Website: www.spacince.sk

Špačince (Hungarian: Ispáca) is a village and municipality of Trnava District in the Trnava region of Slovakia.

== Geography ==
The municipality lies at an altitude of 158 metres (518 ft) and covers an area of 22.10 km^{2} (8.53 sq mi) (2025).

== Population ==
Population statistic (10 years)
| Year | 1995 | 2005 | 2015 | 2025 |
|---|---|---|---|---|
| Count | 2029 | 2047 | 2708 | 3370 |
| Difference | | +0.88% | +32.29% | +24.44% |

Population statistic
| Year | 2024 | 2025 |
|---|---|---|
| Count | 3378 | 3370 |
| Difference | | −0.23% |

It has a population of 3370 people (31 December 2025).

=== Ethnicity ===
Census 2021 (1+ %)
| Ethnicity | Number | Fraction |
|---|---|---|
| Slovak | 3038 | 97.68% |
| Not found out | 72 | 2.31% |
| Total | 3110 | |

In year 2021 was 3110 people by ethnicity 3038 as Slovak, 72 as Not found out, 14 as Czech, 12 as Other, 3 as German, 2 as Jewish, 2 as Romani, 2 as Russian, 2 as Polish, 2 as Hungarian, 1 as Irish, 1 as Austrian, 1 as Canadian, 1 as French and 1 as English.

Note on population: The difference values of population numbers in the table "Population statistic" and in the sections "Ethnicity" & "Religion" is caused by the use of various statistical methods.

=== Religion ===
Census 2021 (1+ %)
| Religion | Number | Fraction |
|---|---|---|
| Roman Catholic Church | 2248 | 72.28% |
| None | 695 | 22.35% |
| Not found out | 64 | 2.06% |
| Total | 3110 | |

In year 2021 was 3110 people by religion 2248 from Roman Catholic Church, 695 from None, 64 from Not found out, 27 from Evangelical Church, 11 from Other and not ascertained christian church, 11 from Christian Congregations in Slovakia, 11 from Other, 11 from Ad hoc movements, 4 from Calvinist Church, 4 from Greek Catholic Church, 4 from Seventh-day Adventist Church, 4 from Buddhism, 3 from Eastern Orthodox Church, 3 from Paganism and natural spirituality, 3 from Islam, 3 from United Methodist Church, 1 from Jewish community, 1 from Old Catholic Church, 1 from Hinduism and 1 from Baptists Church.
