= Križovany nad Dudváhom =

Village in Slovakia

- Municipality
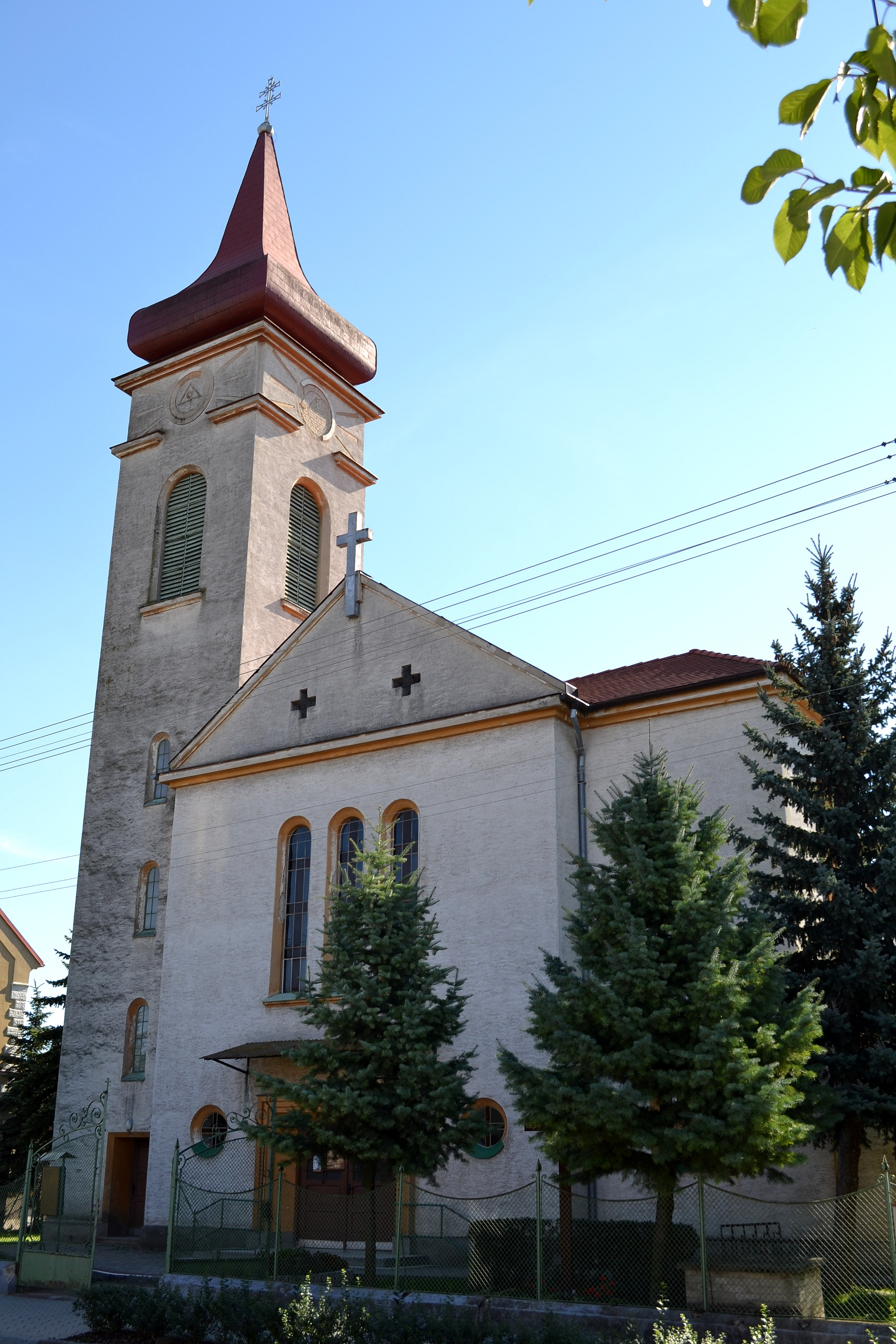

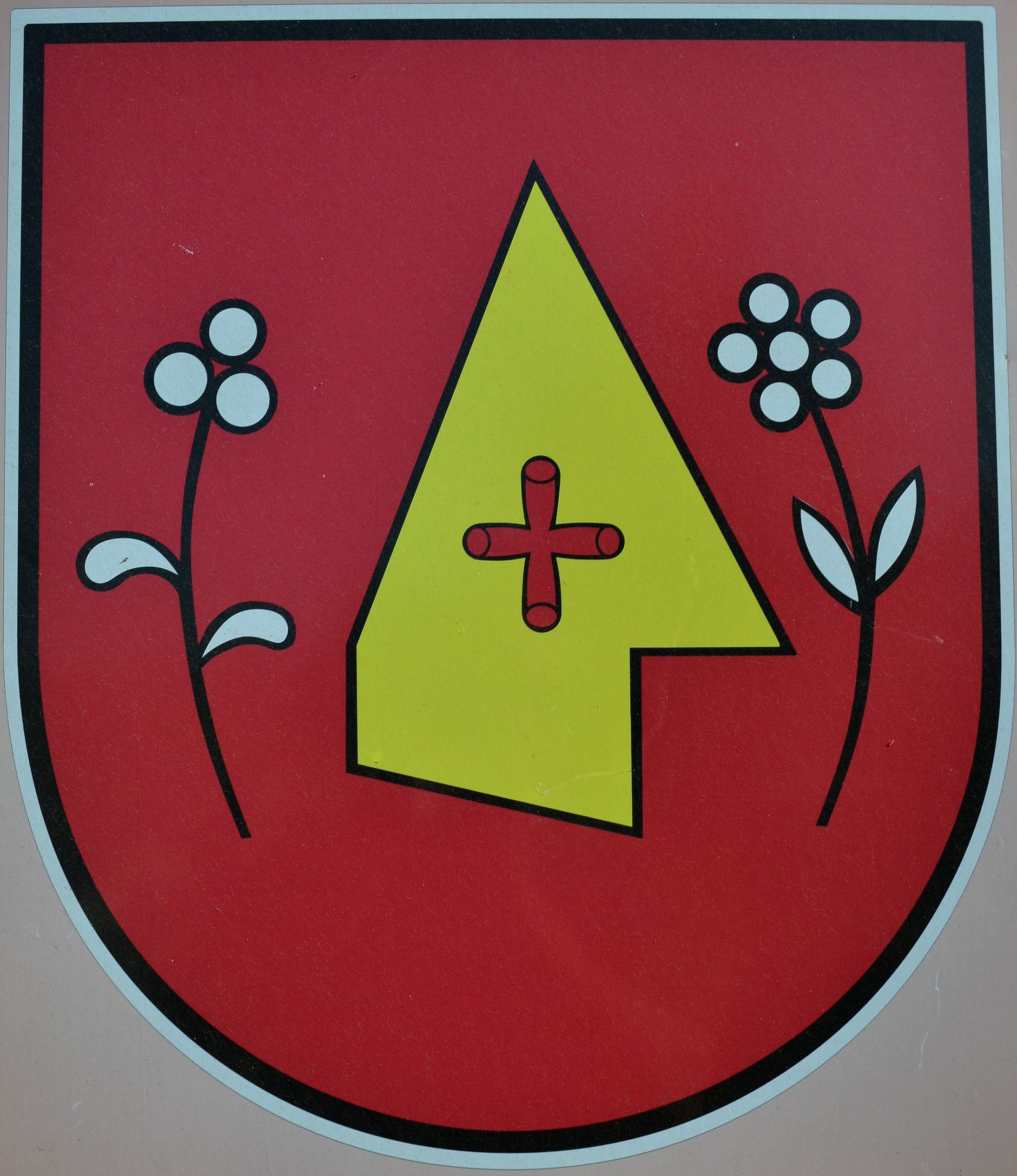
- Flag Coat of arms

- Location of Križovany nad Dudváhom in the Trnava Region Location of Križovany nad Dudváhom in Slovakia
- Coordinates: 48.33°N 17.66°E
- Country: Slovakia
- Region: Trnava Region
- District: Trnava District
- First mentioned: 1390

Area
  - Total: 10.26 km^{2} (3.96 sq mi)
- Elevation: 132 m (433 ft)

Population (2025)
  - Total: 1,800
- Time zone: UTC+1 (CET)
  - Summer (DST): UTC+2 (CEST)
- Postal code: 919 24
- Area code: +421 33
- Vehicle registration plate (until 2022): TT
- Website: www.krizovany.sk

Križovany nad Dudváhom (Hungarian: Vágkeresztúr) is a village and municipality of Trnava District in the Trnava region of Slovakia.

== Geography ==
The municipality lies at an altitude of 132 metres (433 ft) and covers an area of 10.26 km^{2} (3.96 sq mi) (2025).

== Population ==
Population statistic (10 years)
Year	1995	2005	2015	2025
Count	1751	1795	1805	1800
Difference		+2.51%	+0.55%	−0.27%

Population statistic
Year	2024	2025
Count	1797	1800
Difference		+0.16%

It has a population of 1800 people (31 December 2025).

=== Ethnicity ===
Census 2021 (1+ %)
Ethnicity	Number	Fraction
Slovak	1670	95.7%
Not found out	60	3.43%
Total	1745	

In year 2021 was 1745 people by ethnicity 1670 as Slovak, 60 as Not found out, 9 as Czech, 6 as Hungarian, 4 as Russian, 3 as Vietnamese, 3 as Rusyn, 2 as Italian, 2 as German, 2 as Other, 2 as Bulgarian, 1 as Romanian and 1 as Korean.

Note on population: The difference values of population numbers in the table "Population statistic" and in the sections "Ethnicity" & "Religion" is caused by the use of various statistical methods.

=== Religion ===
Census 2021 (1+ %)
Religion	Number	Fraction
Roman Catholic Church	1352	77.48%
None	279	15.99%
Not found out	62	3.55%
Total	1745	

In year 2021 was 1745 people by religion 1352 from Roman Catholic Church, 279 from None, 62 from Not found out, 14 from Evangelical Church, 12 from Other, 8 from Greek Catholic Church, 8 from Ad hoc movements, 3 from Christian Congregations in Slovakia, 2 from Jehovah's Witnesses, 2 from Buddhism, 1 from Jewish community, 1 from New Apostolic Church and 1 from Bahá'i Community.

== Rotunda ==
The old rotunda is one of the most interesting things to see in the village. It was built in the 11th century and has an interesting combination of Gothic and Romanesque elements. The patrotinium was the Saint Cross. In 1246 had been built a chapel to the rotunda and in 1780 had been constructed a new baroque church, which had been, however, demolished in 1937 so that a church with higher believers capacity will be built. But State Institute for the protection of historical sightseeings insisted on the protection of the rotunda and this had been succeeded. In 1938 the new church had been built, the old rotunda was preserved and the murals were restored between 1967 and 1970. Rotunda as well as the church are the possessions of the local Roman Catholic church. Inside the building are performed regular worship services.

== Notable persons ==
- Igor Bališ, football player, played for Slovak representation, former player of FC Spartak Trnava and West Bromwich Albion F.C.
- Gejza Dusík, Slovak composer
