= Zvončín =

- Municipality
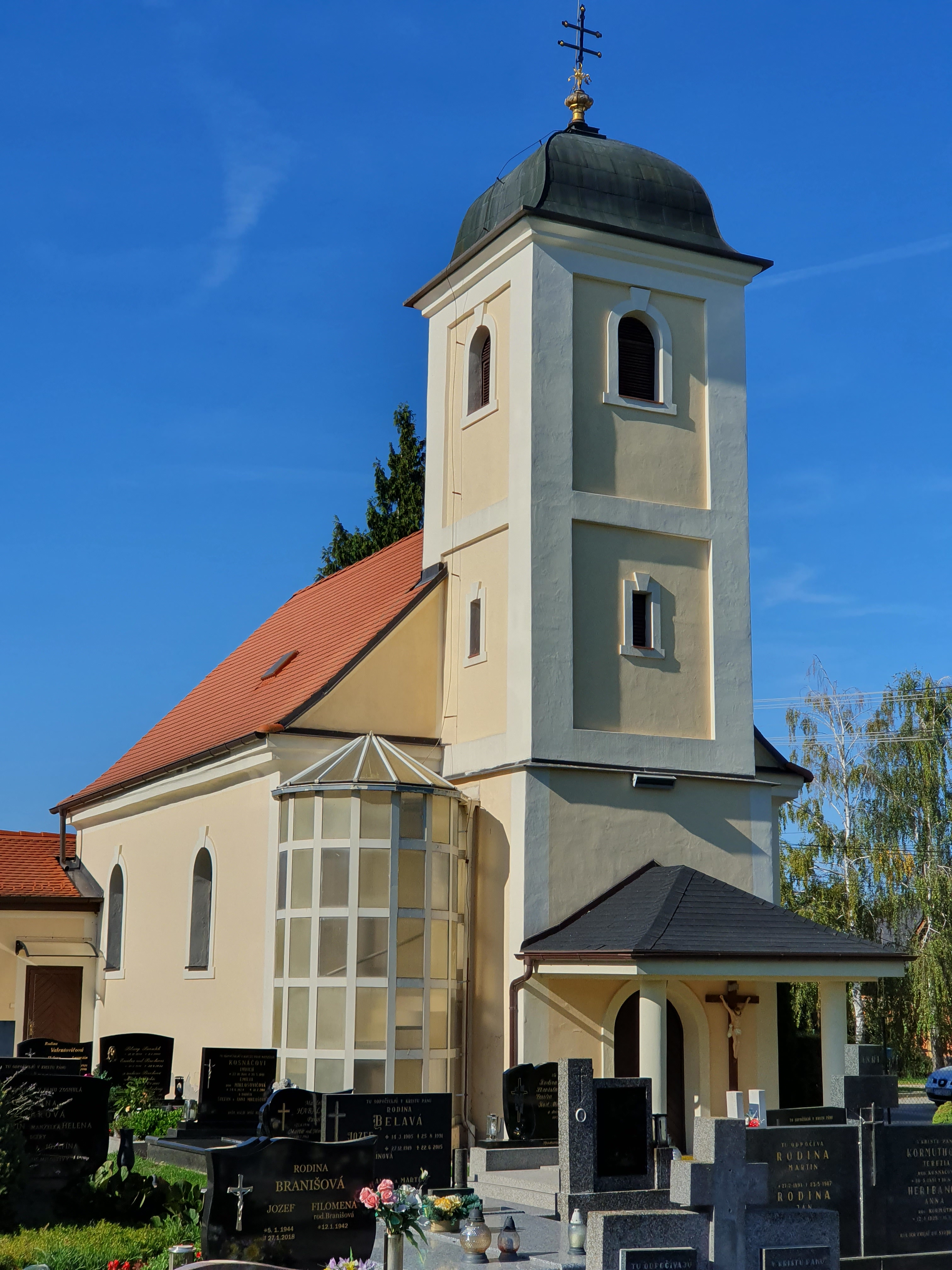

- Flag

- Location of Zvončín in the Trnava Region Location of Zvončín in Slovakia
- Coordinates: 48.40°N 17.50°E
- Country: Slovakia
- Region: Trnava Region
- District: Trnava District
- First mentioned: 1539

Area
  - Total: 8.24 km^{2} (3.18 sq mi)
- Elevation: 156 m (512 ft)

Population (2025)
  - Total: 1,039
- Time zone: UTC+1 (CET)
  - Summer (DST): UTC+2 (CEST)
- Postal code: 919 01
- Area code: +421 33
- Vehicle registration plate (until 2022): TT
- Website: www.zvoncin.sk

Zvončín (Hungarian: Harangfalva) is a village and municipality of Trnava District in the Trnava region of Slovakia.

== Geography ==
The municipality lies at an altitude of 156 metres (512 ft) and covers an area of 8.24 km^{2} (3.18 sq mi) (2025).

== Population ==
Population statistic (10 years)
Year	1995	2005	2015	2025
Count	631	660	791	1039
Difference		+4.59%	+19.84%	+31.35%

Population statistic
Year	2024	2025
Count	1039	1039
Difference		+0%

It has a population of 1039 people (31 December 2025).

=== Ethnicity ===
Census 2021 (1+ %)
Ethnicity	Number	Fraction
Slovak	905	98.69%
Total	917	

In year 2021 was 917 people by ethnicity 905 as Slovak, 7 as Not found out, 6 as Czech, 5 as Hungarian, 4 as Other, 3 as Rusyn and 1 as Romanian.

Note on population: The difference values of population numbers in the table "Population statistic" and in the sections "Ethnicity" & "Religion" is caused by the use of various statistical methods.

=== Religion ===
Census 2021 (1+ %)
Religion	Number	Fraction
Roman Catholic Church	614	66.96%
None	256	27.92%
Not found out	13	1.42%
Total	917	

In year 2021 was 917 people by religion 614 from Roman Catholic Church, 256 from None, 13 from Not found out, 7 from Greek Catholic Church, 6 from Other, 5 from Other and not ascertained christian church, 4 from Christian Congregations in Slovakia, 3 from Calvinist Church, 3 from Evangelical Church, 3 from Ad hoc movements, 1 from Eastern Orthodox Church, 1 from Church of the Brethren and 1 from Buddhism.
