= Bučany =

- Municipality
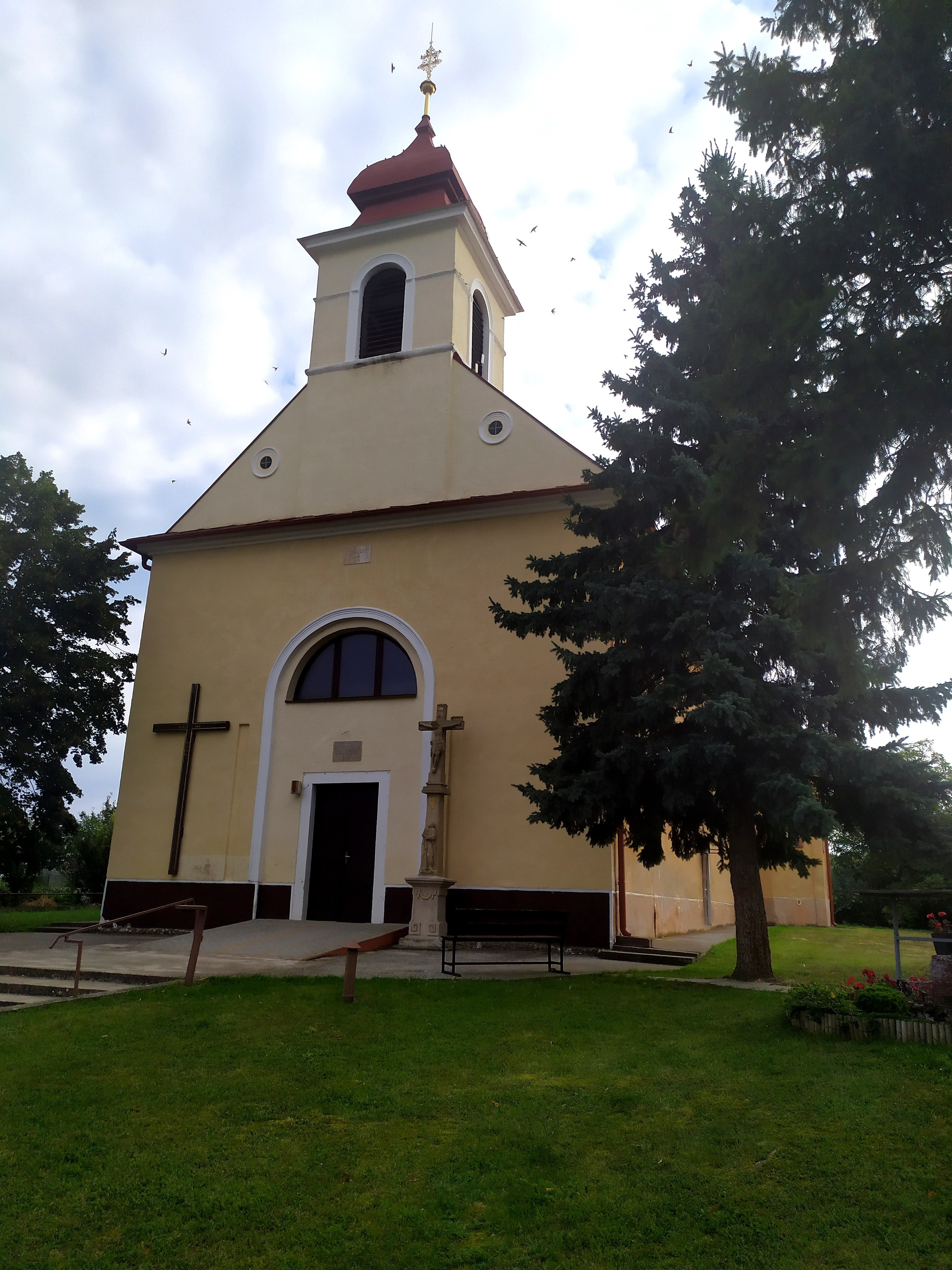

- Flag

- Location of Bučany in the Trnava Region Location of Bučany in Slovakia
- Coordinates: 48.42°N 17.72°E
- Country: Slovakia
- Region: Trnava Region
- District: Trnava District
- First mentioned: 1258

Area
  - Total: 16.58 km^{2} (6.40 sq mi)
- Elevation: 153 m (502 ft)

Population (2025)
  - Total: 2,366
- Time zone: UTC+1 (CET)
  - Summer (DST): UTC+2 (CEST)
- Postal code: 919 28
- Area code: +421 33
- Vehicle registration plate (until 2022): TT
- Website: www.bucany.sk

Bučany (Hungarian: Bucsány) is a municipality of Trnava District in the Trnava region of Slovakia. Its current timezone offset is UTC+1.

Located at sea level, Bucany has a marine west coast, warm summer climate. It receives about 76.61 millimeters (3.02 inches) of precipitation and has 136.12 rainy days (37.29% of the time) annually.

== Geography ==
The municipality lies at an altitude of 153 metres (502 ft) and covers an area of 16.58 km^{2} (6.40 sq mi) (2025).

== Population ==
Population statistic (10 years)
Year	1995	2005	2015	2025
Count	2071	2176	2289	2366
Difference		+5.07%	+5.19%	+3.36%

Population statistic
Year	2024	2025
Count	2380	2366
Difference		−0.58%

It has a population of 2366 people (31 December 2025).

=== Ethnicity ===
Census 2021 (1+ %)
Ethnicity	Number	Fraction
Slovak	2333	97.77%
Not found out	46	1.92%
Total	2386	

In year 2021 was 2386 people by ethnicity 2333 as Slovak, 46 as Not found out, 10 as Czech, 6 as Russian, 6 as Hungarian, 6 as Other, 5 as Italian, 4 as French, 2 as German, 2 as Bulgarian, 1 as Ukrainian, 1 as Serbian, 1 as Rusyn, 1 as Romanian and 1 as English.

Note on population: The difference values of population numbers in the table "Population statistic" and in the sections "Ethnicity" & "Religion" is caused by the use of various statistical methods.

=== Religion ===
Census 2021 (1+ %)
Religion	Number	Fraction
Roman Catholic Church	1793	75.15%
None	422	17.69%
Not found out	68	2.85%
Evangelical Church	27	1.13%
Total	2386	

In year 2021 was 2386 people by religion 1793 from Roman Catholic Church, 422 from None, 68 from Not found out, 27 from Evangelical Church, 16 from Greek Catholic Church, 13 from Christian Congregations in Slovakia, 10 from Ad hoc movements, 9 from Other, 6 from Other and not ascertained christian church, 5 from Calvinist Church, 5 from Jehovah's Witnesses, 4 from Church of the Brethren, 3 from Eastern Orthodox Church, 2 from Jewish community, 2 from Paganism and natural spirituality and 1 from Old Catholic Church.

== Genealogical resources ==
The records for genealogical research are available at the state archive "Statny Archiv in Bratislava, Nitra, Slovakia"

- Roman Catholic church records (births/marriages/deaths): 1711-1895 (parish A)
- Lutheran church records (births/marriages/deaths): 1792-1928 (parish B)

== See also ==
- List of municipalities and towns in Slovakia
