= Dlhá =

- Municipality
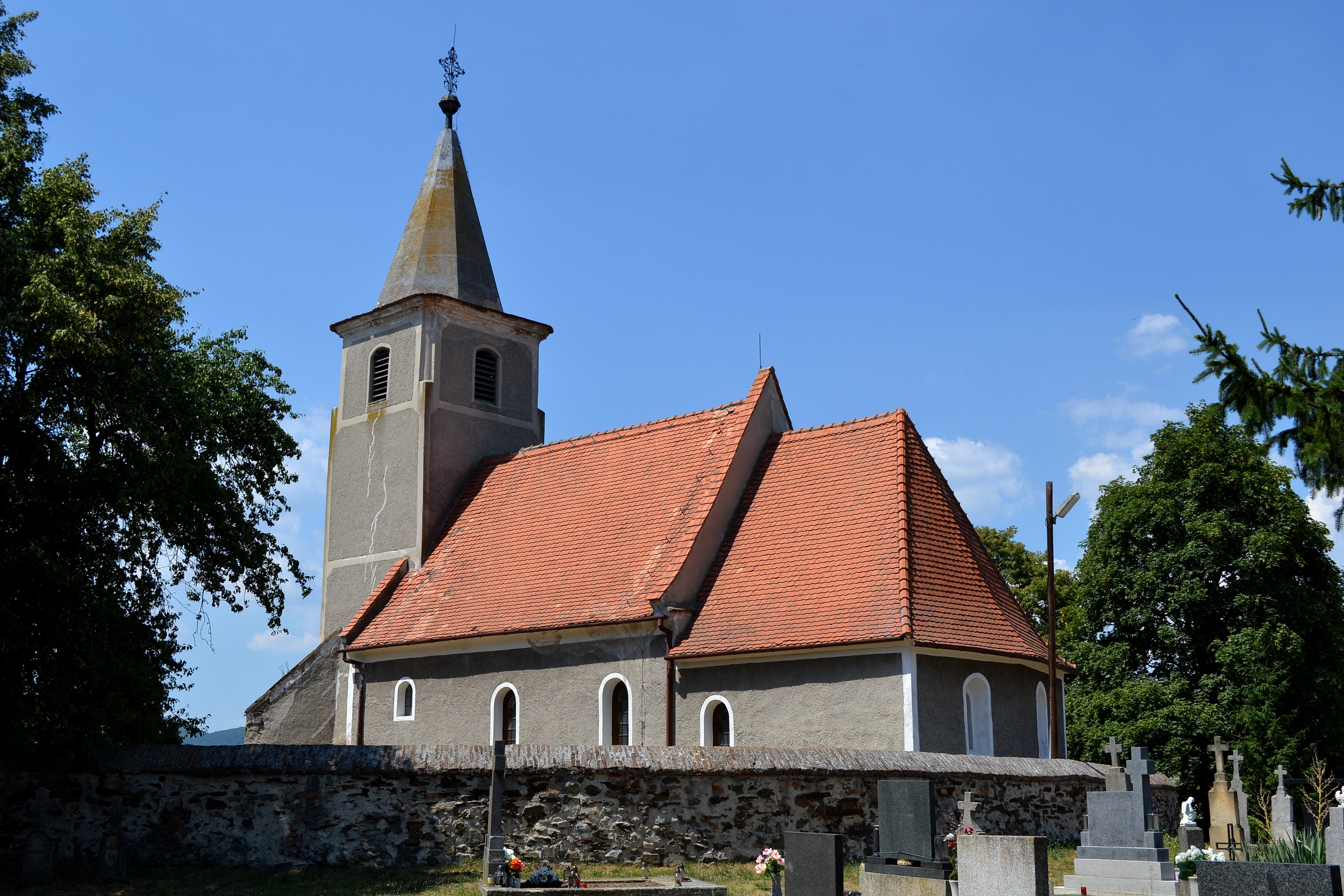

- Flag

- Location of Dlhá in the Trnava Region Location of Dlhá in Slovakia
- Coordinates: 48.41°N 17.43°E
- Country: Slovakia
- Region: Trnava Region
- District: Trnava District
- First mentioned: 1296

Government
  - Mayor: Roman Horváth (Independent)

Area
  - Total: 11.80 km^{2} (4.56 sq mi)
- Elevation: 187 m (614 ft)

Population (2025)
  - Total: 427
- Time zone: UTC+1 (CET)
  - Summer (DST): UTC+2 (CEST)
- Postal code: 919 01
- Area code: +421 33
- Vehicle registration plate (until 2022): TT
- Website: www.dlha.sk

Dlhá (Hungarian: Felsőhosszúfalu) is a municipality of Trnava District in the Trnava region of Slovakia.

== See also ==
- List of municipalities and towns in Slovakia

== Geography ==
The municipality lies at an altitude of 187 metres (614 ft) and covers an area of 11.80 km^{2} (4.56 sq mi) (2025).

== Population ==
Population statistic (10 years)
Year	1995	2005	2015	2025
Count	392	361	442	427
Difference		−7.90%	+22.43%	−3.39%

Population statistic
Year	2024	2025
Count	420	427
Difference		+1.66%

It has a population of 427 people (31 December 2025).

=== Ethnicity ===
Census 2021 (1+ %)
Ethnicity	Number	Fraction
Slovak	426	96.59%
Not found out	11	2.49%
Total	441	

In year 2021 was 441 people by ethnicity 426 as Slovak, 11 as Not found out, 2 as Romani, 2 as Russian, 2 as Hungarian, 1 as Moravian and 1 as Croatian.

Note on population: The difference values of population numbers in the table "Population statistic" and in the sections "Ethnicity" & "Religion" is caused by the use of various statistical methods.

=== Religion ===
Census 2021 (1+ %)
Religion	Number	Fraction
Roman Catholic Church	330	74.83%
None	81	18.37%
Not found out	16	3.63%
Evangelical Church	6	1.36%
Total	441	

In year 2021 was 441 people by religion 330 from Roman Catholic Church, 81 from None, 16 from Not found out, 6 from Evangelical Church, 4 from Other, 2 from Greek Catholic Church, 1 from Calvinist Church and 1 from Ad hoc movements.

== Genealogical resources ==
The records for genealogical research are available at the state archive "Statny Archiv in Bratislava, Slovakia"

- Roman Catholic church records (births/marriages/deaths): 1687-1915 (parish A)
- Lutheran church records (births/marriages/deaths): 1666-1895 (parish B)
- Reformated church records (births/marriages/deaths): 1666-1895 (parish AB)
