= Trnava District =

Coordinates: 48°22′25″N 17°35′42″E

- District
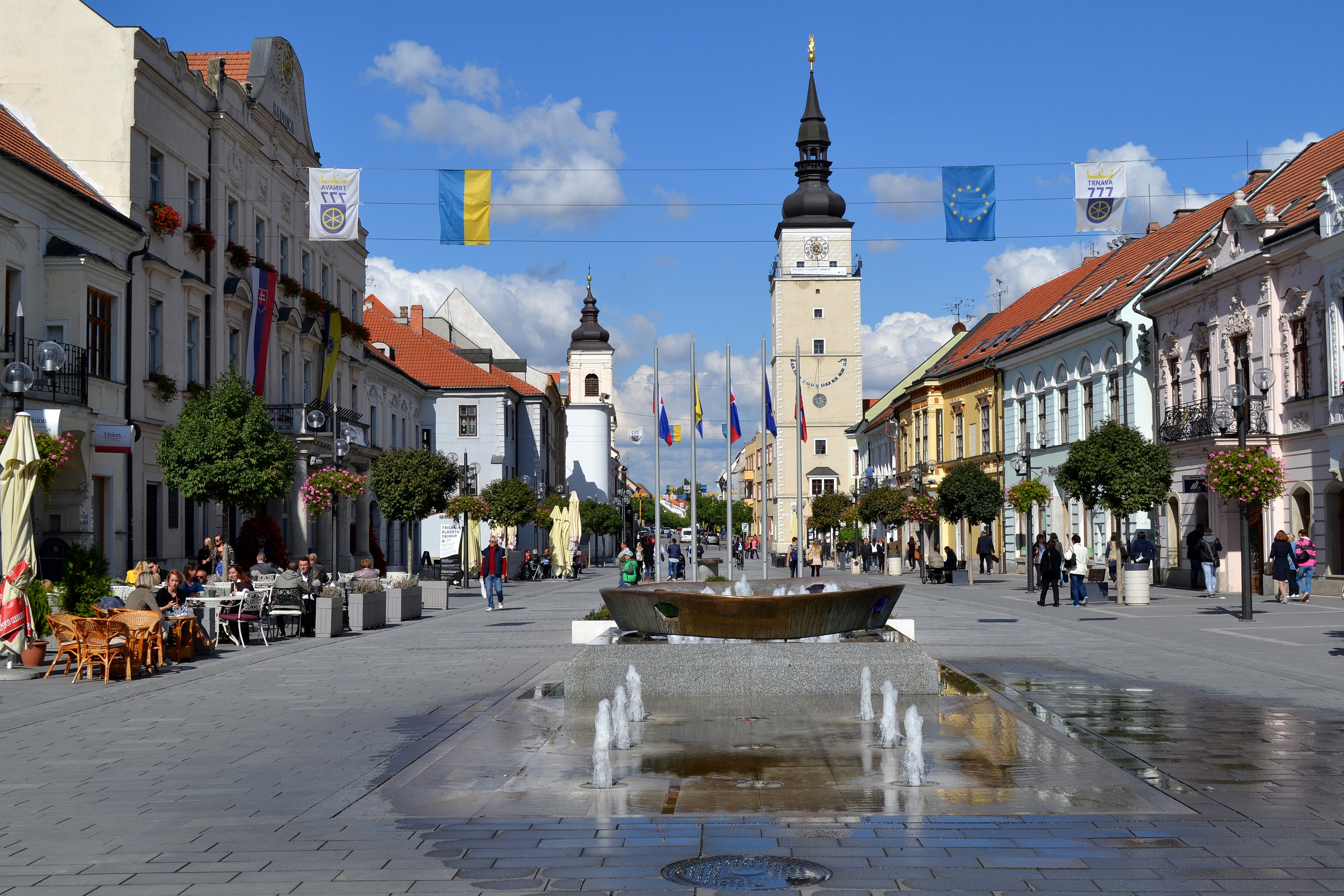
- Country: Slovakia
- Region (kraj): Trnava Region
- Seat: Trnava

Area
  - Total: 741.30 km^{2} (286.22 sq mi)

Population (2025)
  - Total: 132,879
- Time zone: UTC+1 (CET)
  - Summer (DST): UTC+2 (CEST)
- Telephone prefix: 33
- Vehicle registration plate (until 2022): TT
- Municipalities: 45

Trnava District (Slovak: okres Trnava) is a district in the Trnava Region of Slovakia. In its present borders the district was established in 1996. Before that date Hlohovec district was a part of it. It comprises the villages around Trnava, which forms an administrative, cultural and economy center of the district. The towns and villages are partly bedroom communities for the people who work in Trnava or Bratislava.

== Population ==
Historical population
Year	Pop.	±%
1970	107,262	—
1980	121,599	+13.4%
1991	124,971	+2.8%
2001	127,125	+1.7%
2011	128,567	+1.1%
2021	131,894	+2.6%
Source: Censuses

Population statistic (10 years)
Year	1995	2005	2015	2025
Count	126,333	126,986	130,381	132,879
Difference		+0.51%	+2.67%	+1.91%

Population statistic
Year	2024	2025
Count	132,788	132,879
Difference		+0.06%

It has a population of 132,879 people (31 December 2025).

=== Ethnicity ===
Census 2021 (1+ %)
Ethnicity	Number	Fraction
Slovak	123,133	91.67%
Not found out	7256	5.4%
Total	134,321	

In year 2021 was 134,321 people by ethnicity 123,133 as Slovak, 7256 as Not found out, 892 as Czech, 576 as Other, 436 as Hungarian, 338 as Romani, 234 as Russian, 229 as Ukrainian, 171 as Rusyn, 162 as Serbian, 142 as German, 128 as Vietnamese, 93 as Polish, 70 as Romanian, 58 as Italian, 56 as Croatian, 51 as Bulgarian, 49 as Moravian, 48 as French, 32 as Austrian, 28 as Jewish, 28 as English, 25 as Chinese, 19 as Korean, 14 as Irish, 13 as Albanian, 12 as Canadian, 10 as Turkish, 9 as Greek, 8 as Silesian and 1 as Iranian.

Note on population: The difference values of population numbers in the table "Population statistic" and in the sections "Ethnicity" & "Religion" is caused by the use of various statistical methods.

=== Religion ===
Census 2021 (1+ %)
Religion	Number	Fraction
Roman Catholic Church	84,322	63.93%
None	33,016	25.03%
Not found out	8451	6.41%
Evangelical Church	2193	1.66%
Total	131,894	

In year 2021 was 131,894 people by religion 84,322 from Roman Catholic Church, 33,016 from None, 8451 from Not found out, 2193 from Evangelical Church, 743 from Greek Catholic Church, 493 from Other, 478 from Ad hoc movements, 425 from Christian Congregations in Slovakia, 344 from Eastern Orthodox Church, 248 from Other and not ascertained christian church, 196 from Buddhism, 159 from Calvinist Church, 141 from Paganism and natural spirituality, 127 from Jehovah's Witnesses, 115 from Islam, 88 from Church of the Brethren, 72 from United Methodist Church, 69 from Seventh-day Adventist Church, 42 from Old Catholic Church, 41 from Apostolic Church, 40 from Jewish community, 36 from Hinduism, 18 from Bahá'i Community, 16 from Baptists Church, 15 from Czechoslovak Hussite Church, 5 from Church of Jesus Christ of Latter-day Saints and 1 from New Apostolic Church.

== Municipalities ==
Municipality	Area [km^{2}]	Population
Biely Kostol	2.41	2,581
Bíňovce	7.79	633
Bohdanovce nad Trnavou	11.48	1,537
Boleráz	25.46	2,393
Borová	5.90	452
Brestovany	16.36	2,496
Bučany	16.58	2,366
Buková	24.29	665
Cífer	29.88	4,901
Dechtice	19.46	1,707
Dlhá	11.80	427
Dobrá Voda	32.97	783
Dolná Krupá	24.63	2,430
Dolné Dubové	10.03	768
Dolné Lovčice	5.74	802
Dolné Orešany	17.89	1,441
Horná Krupá	8.65	488
Horné Dubové	7.27	348
Horné Orešany	21.56	1,934
Hrnčiarovce nad Parnou	16.27	2,196
Jaslovské Bohunice	20.08	2,458
Kátlovce	11.70	1,119
Košolná	9.58	877
Križovany nad Dudváhom	10.26	1,800
Lošonec	23.70	623
Majcichov	18.19	2,176
Malženice	14.85	1,497
Naháč	19.67	398
Opoj	4.61	1,349
Pavlice	7.62	525
Radošovce	7.28	383
Ružindol	14.70	1,749
Slovenská Nová Ves	8.31	565
Smolenice	28.96	3,242
Suchá nad Parnou	14.38	2,324
Šelpice	10.17	904
Špačince	22.10	3,370
Šúrovce	19.90	2,242
Trnava	71.53	63,184
Trstín	26.18	1,370
Vlčkovce	12.86	1,369
Voderady	14.14	1,787
Zavar	13.95	2,622
Zeleneč	11.74	2,559
Zvončín	8.24	1,039

Population and area values are current for year 2025.
