= Suchá nad Parnou =

- Municipality
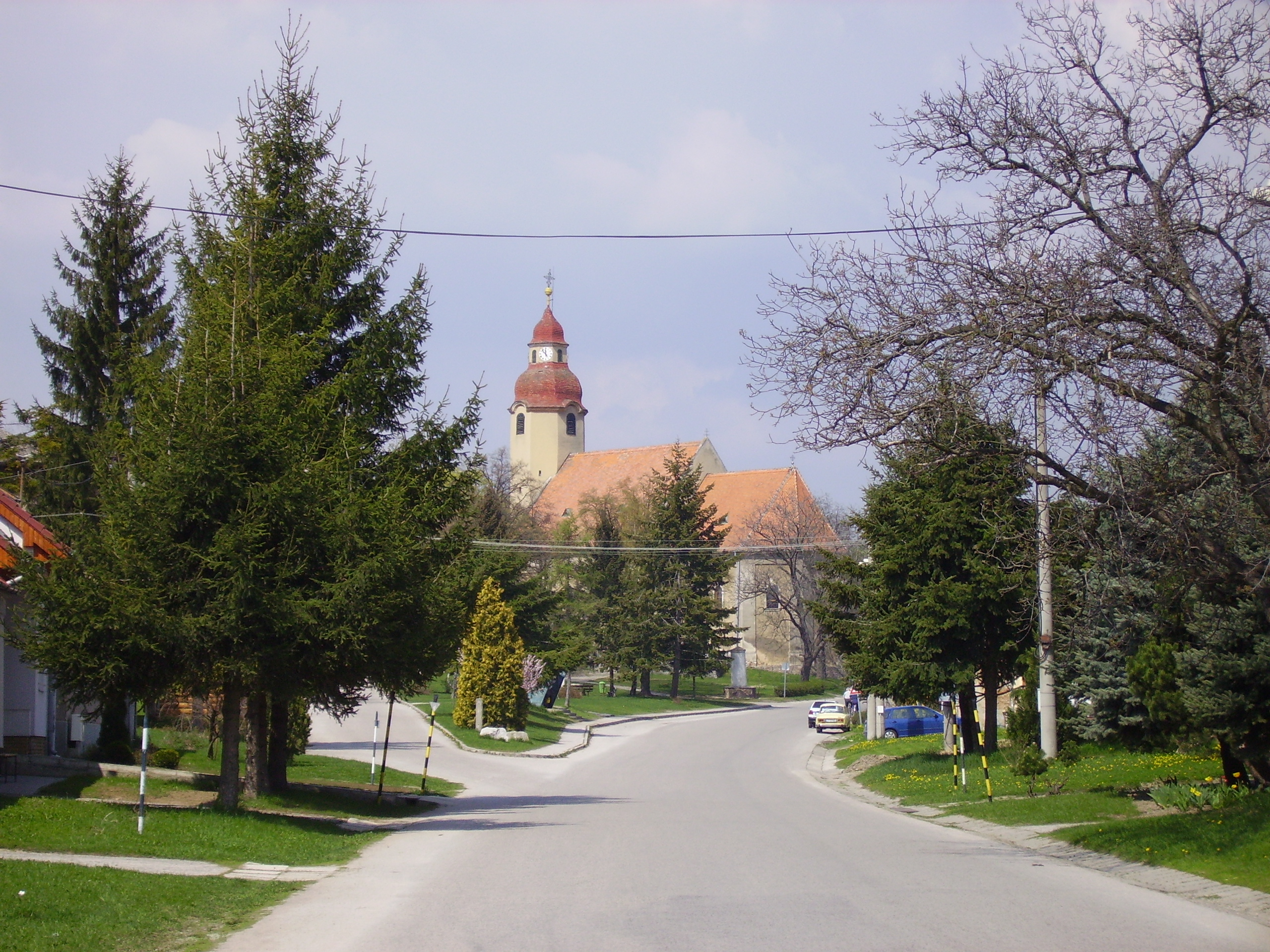
- Saint Martin's Church

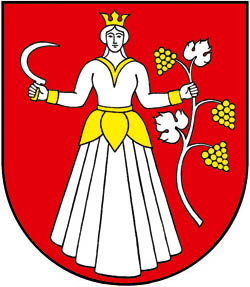
- Flag Coat of arms

- Location of Suchá nad Parnou in the Trnava Region Location of Suchá nad Parnou in Slovakia
- Coordinates: 48.41°N 17.49°E
- Country: Slovakia
- Region: Trnava Region
- District: Trnava District
- First mentioned: 1296

Area
  - Total: 14.38 km^{2} (5.55 sq mi)
- Elevation: 176 m (577 ft)

Population (2025)
  - Total: 2,324
- Time zone: UTC+1 (CET)
  - Summer (DST): UTC+2 (CEST)
- Postal code: 919 01
- Area code: +421 33
- Vehicle registration plate (until 2022): TT
- Website: www.suchanadparnou.sk

Suchá nad Parnou is a village and municipality in the Trnava District in the Trnava region of Slovakia. The municipality is located in the Trnava Upland, partially in the valley of the rivers Podháj and Parná. Suchá nad Parnou has an area of 1468 ha and is situated at an altitude of 161–231 m above sea level, with the center of the village at 174 m above sea level. The village Šelpice lays to the East, to the Southeast and South lay Zvončín and Ružindol, in the east Suchá nad Parnou is bordered by Dlhá. To the North Košolná, Boleráz and on Northwest Klčovany are located. Suchá nad Parnou is situated about 7 km to the west of Trnava.

== Geography ==
The municipality lies at an altitude of 176 metres (577 ft) and covers an area of 14.38 km^{2} (5.55 sq mi) (2025).

== Population ==
Population statistic (10 years)
Year	1995	2005	2015	2025
Count	1614	1781	2054	2324
Difference		+10.34%	+15.32%	+13.14%

Population statistic
Year	2024	2025
Count	2328	2324
Difference		−0.17%

It has a population of 2324 people (31 December 2025).

=== Ethnicity ===
Census 2021 (1+ %)
Ethnicity	Number	Fraction
Slovak	2094	95.09%
Not found out	86	3.9%
Total	2202	

In year 2021 was 2202 people by ethnicity 2094 as Slovak, 86 as Not found out, 13 as Czech, 5 as Vietnamese, 4 as Other, 4 as Bulgarian, 3 as Romanian, 3 as German, 2 as Ukrainian, 2 as Silesian, 2 as Hungarian, 1 as Turkish, 1 as Romani, 1 as Rusyn, 1 as Russian, 1 as Polish, 1 as Moravian, 1 as French and 1 as Albanian.

Note on population: The difference values of population numbers in the table "Population statistic" and in the sections "Ethnicity" & "Religion" is caused by the use of various statistical methods.

=== Religion ===
Census 2021 (1+ %)
Religion	Number	Fraction
Roman Catholic Church	1499	68.07%
None	520	23.61%
Not found out	101	4.59%
Evangelical Church	29	1.32%
Total	2202	

In year 2021 was 2202 people by religion 1499 from Roman Catholic Church, 520 from None, 101 from Not found out, 29 from Evangelical Church, 9 from Greek Catholic Church, 9 from Ad hoc movements, 8 from Christian Congregations in Slovakia, 6 from Other, 5 from Church of the Brethren, 4 from United Methodist Church, 3 from Buddhism, 2 from Other and not ascertained christian church, 1 from Jewish community, 1 from Old Catholic Church, 1 from Calvinist Church, 1 from Paganism and natural spirituality, 1 from Islam, 1 from Hinduism and 1 from Seventh-day Adventist Church.

== Famous people ==
- Ján Ježovít (*1909 – † 1994), SDB, Roman Catholic priest end Missionary (China, Thailand).
