= Šelpice =

- Municipality
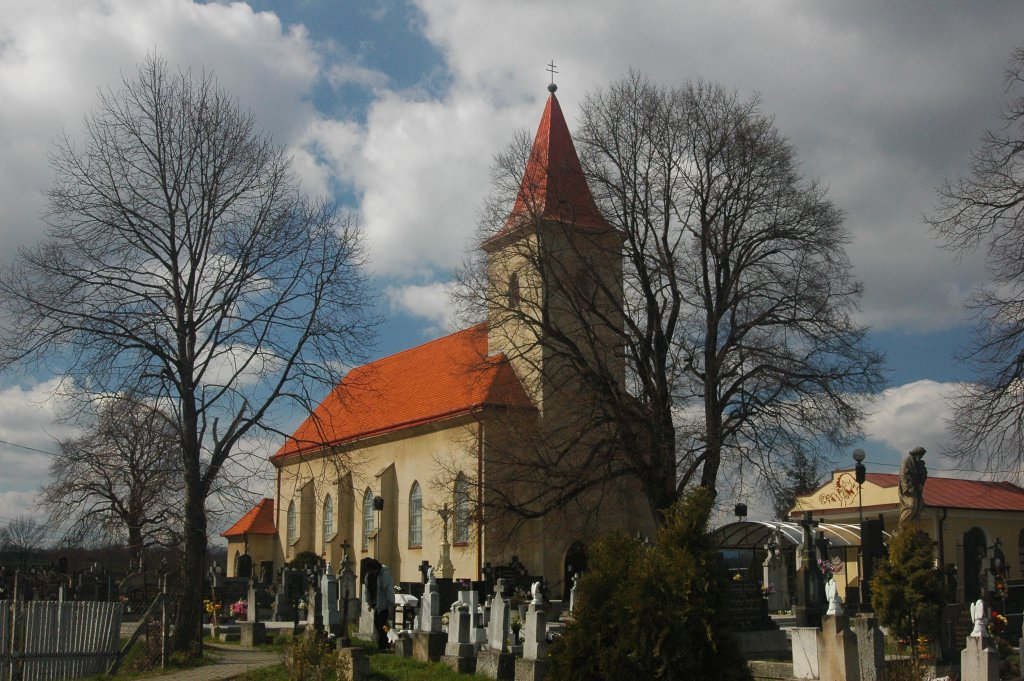
- Church in Šelpice

- Flag

- Location of Šelpice in the Trnava Region Location of Šelpice in Slovakia
- Coordinates: 48.43°N 17.53°E
- Country: Slovakia
- Region: Trnava Region
- District: Trnava District
- First mentioned: 1283

Area
  - Total: 10.17 km^{2} (3.93 sq mi)
- Elevation: 164 m (538 ft)

Population (2025)
  - Total: 904
- Time zone: UTC+1 (CET)
  - Summer (DST): UTC+2 (CEST)
- Postal code: 919 09
- Area code: +421 33
- Vehicle registration plate (until 2022): TT
- Website: www.selpice.eu

Šelpice (Hungarian: Selpőc) is a village and municipality of Trnava District in the Trnava region of Slovakia.

== Geography ==
The municipality lies at an altitude of 164 metres (538 ft) and covers an area of 10.17 km^{2} (3.93 sq mi) (2025).

== Population ==
Population statistic (10 years)
Year	1995	2005	2015	2025
Count	579	608	875	904
Difference		+5.00%	+43.91%	+3.31%

Population statistic
Year	2024	2025
Count	901	904
Difference		+0.33%

It has a population of 904 people (31 December 2025).

=== Ethnicity ===
Census 2021 (1+ %)
Ethnicity	Number	Fraction
Slovak	837	91.27%
Not found out	63	6.87%
Total	917	

In year 2021 was 917 people by ethnicity 837 as Slovak, 63 as Not found out, 8 as Hungarian, 8 as Other, 7 as Czech, 4 as Vietnamese, 2 as Italian, 2 as Russian, 2 as Moravian, 1 as Serbian, 1 as Romani and 1 as Romanian.

Note on population: The difference values of population numbers in the table "Population statistic" and in the sections "Ethnicity" & "Religion" is caused by the use of various statistical methods.

=== Religion ===
Census 2021 (1+ %)
Religion	Number	Fraction
Roman Catholic Church	615	67.07%
None	201	21.92%
Not found out	60	6.54%
Evangelical Church	12	1.31%
Total	917	

In year 2021 was 917 people by religion 615 from Roman Catholic Church, 201 from None, 60 from Not found out, 12 from Evangelical Church, 6 from Other, 4 from Apostolic Church, 3 from Christian Congregations in Slovakia, 3 from Greek Catholic Church, 3 from Ad hoc movements, 2 from Calvinist Church, 2 from Eastern Orthodox Church, 2 from Buddhism, 1 from Jewish community, 1 from Paganism and natural spirituality, 1 from Jehovah's Witnesses and 1 from Islam.
