= Kátlovce =

- Municipality
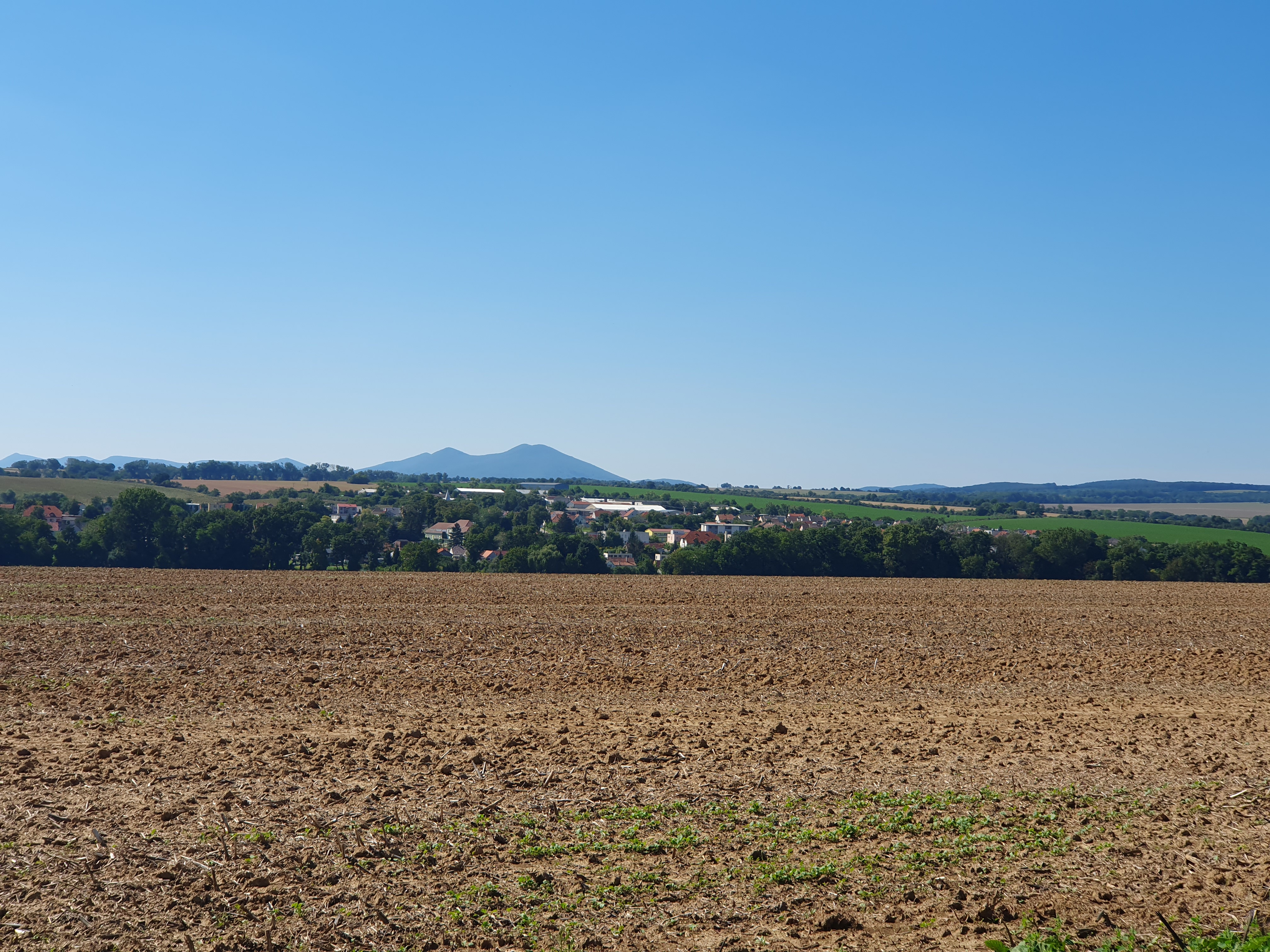

- Flag

- Location of Kátlovce in the Trnava Region Location of Kátlovce in Slovakia
- Coordinates: 48.53°N 17.61°E
- Country: Slovakia
- Region: Trnava Region
- District: Trnava District
- First mentioned: 1405

Area
  - Total: 11.70 km^{2} (4.52 sq mi)
- Elevation: 172 m (564 ft)

Population (2025)
  - Total: 1,119
- Time zone: UTC+1 (CET)
  - Summer (DST): UTC+2 (CEST)
- Postal code: 919 55
- Area code: +421 33
- Vehicle registration plate (until 2022): TT
- Website: www.katlovce.sk

Kátlovce (Hungarian: Kátló) is a village and municipality of Trnava District in the Trnava region of Slovakia.

== Geography ==
The municipality lies at an altitude of 172 metres (564 ft) and covers an area of 11.70 km^{2} (4.52 sq mi) (2025).

== Population ==
Population statistic (10 years)
Year	1995	2005	2015	2025
Count	1055	1109	1177	1119
Difference		+5.11%	+6.13%	−4.92%

Population statistic
Year	2024	2025
Count	1128	1119
Difference		−0.79%

It has a population of 1119 people (31 December 2025).

=== Ethnicity ===
Census 2021 (1+ %)
Ethnicity	Number	Fraction
Slovak	1117	98.58%
Not found out	15	1.32%
Total	1133	

In year 2021 was 1133 people by ethnicity 1117 as Slovak, 15 as Not found out, 9 as Romani, 4 as Other, 3 as Rusyn, 2 as Czech, 2 as Irish and 1 as Croatian.

Note on population: The difference values of population numbers in the table "Population statistic" and in the sections "Ethnicity" & "Religion" is caused by the use of various statistical methods.

=== Religion ===
Census 2021 (1+ %)
Religion	Number	Fraction
Roman Catholic Church	987	87.11%
None	111	9.8%
Not found out	15	1.32%
Total	1133	

In year 2021 was 1133 people by religion 987 from Roman Catholic Church, 111 from None, 15 from Not found out, 5 from Ad hoc movements, 4 from Greek Catholic Church, 3 from Other, 2 from Eastern Orthodox Church, 2 from Christian Congregations in Slovakia, 1 from Calvinist Church, 1 from Paganism and natural spirituality, 1 from Evangelical Church and 1 from Czechoslovak Hussite Church.

== Genealogical resources ==
The records for genealogical research are available at the state archive "Statny Archiv in Bratislava, Slovakia"

- Roman Catholic church records (births/marriages/deaths): 1673–1907 (parish A)
- Lutheran church records (births/marriages/deaths): 1666–1895 (parish B)

== See also ==
- List of municipalities and towns in Slovakia
