= Bohdanovce nad Trnavou =

- Municipality
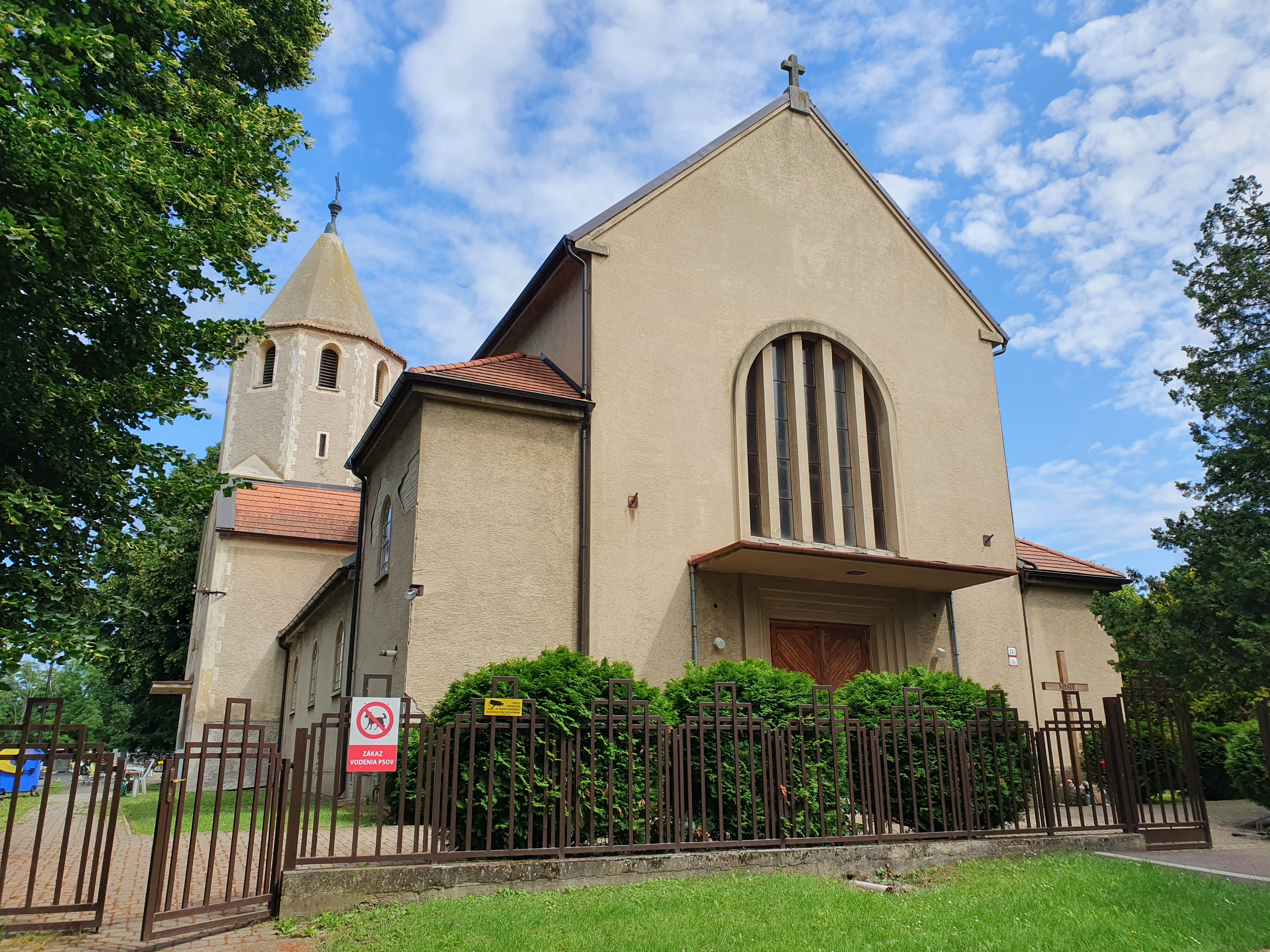

- Flag

- Location of Bohdanovce nad Trnavou in the Trnava Region Location of Bohdanovce nad Trnavou in Slovakia
- Coordinates: 48.43°N 17.55°E
- Country: Slovakia
- Region: Trnava Region
- District: Trnava District
- First mentioned: 1332

Area
  - Total: 11.48 km^{2} (4.43 sq mi)
- Elevation: 169 m (554 ft)

Population (2025)
  - Total: 1,537
- Time zone: UTC+1 (CET)
  - Summer (DST): UTC+2 (CEST)
- Postal code: 919 09
- Area code: +421 33
- Vehicle registration plate (until 2022): TT
- Website: www.bohdanovce.sk

Bohdanovce nad Trnavou (Hungarian: Bogdány) is a municipality of Trnava District in the Trnava region of Slovakia.

== Geography ==
The municipality lies at an altitude of 169 metres (554 ft) and covers an area of 11.48 km^{2} (4.43 sq mi) (2025).

== Population ==
Population statistic (10 years)
Year	1995	2005	2015	2025
Count	945	991	1330	1537
Difference		+4.86%	+34.20%	+15.56%

Population statistic
Year	2024	2025
Count	1529	1537
Difference		+0.52%

It has a population of 1537 people (31 December 2025).

=== Ethnicity ===
Census 2021 (1+ %)
Ethnicity	Number	Fraction
Slovak	1440	98.29%
Not found out	17	1.16%
Total	1465	

In year 2021 was 1465 people by ethnicity 1440 as Slovak, 17 as Not found out, 10 as Czech, 6 as Other, 3 as Russian, 3 as Hungarian, 2 as English, 1 as Jewish, 1 as Romani, 1 as Polish, 1 as German, 1 as Moravian and 1 as Bulgarian.

Note on population: The difference values of population numbers in the table "Population statistic" and in the sections "Ethnicity" & "Religion" is caused by the use of various statistical methods.

=== Religion ===
Census 2021 (1+ %)
Religion	Number	Fraction
Roman Catholic Church	1027	70.1%
None	342	23.34%
Not found out	27	1.84%
Evangelical Church	24	1.64%
Total	1465	

In year 2021 was 1465 people by religion 1027 from Roman Catholic Church, 342 from None, 27 from Not found out, 24 from Evangelical Church, 13 from Greek Catholic Church, 13 from Ad hoc movements, 7 from Other, 5 from Other and not ascertained christian church, 4 from Eastern Orthodox Church, 1 from Paganism and natural spirituality, 1 from Christian Congregations in Slovakia and 1 from Islam.

== Genealogical resources ==
The records for genealogical research are available at the state archive "Statny Archiv in Bratislava, Slovakia"

- Roman Catholic church records (births/marriages/deaths): 1694-1900 (parish A)
- Lutheran church records (births/marriages/deaths): 1666-1895 (parish B)

== See also ==
- List of municipalities and towns in Slovakia
