= Hrnčiarovce nad Parnou =

- Municipality
- Flag

- Location of Hrnčiarovce nad Parnou in the Trnava Region Location of Hrnčiarovce nad Parnou in Slovakia
- Coordinates: 48.35°N 17.57°E
- Country: Slovakia
- Region: Trnava Region
- District: Trnava District
- First mentioned: 1211

Area
  - Total: 16.27 km^{2} (6.28 sq mi)
- Elevation: 141 m (463 ft)

Population (2025)
  - Total: 2,196
- Time zone: UTC+1 (CET)
  - Summer (DST): UTC+2 (CEST)
- Postal code: 917 03
- Area code: +421 33
- Vehicle registration plate (until 2022): TT
- Website: www.hrnciarovce.sk

Hrnčiarovce nad Parnou (Hungarian: Gerencsér) is a village and municipality of the Trnava District in the Trnava region of Slovakia. The village is 5 km southwest from the centre of the town of Trnava.

== Geography ==
The municipality lies at an altitude of 141 metres (463 ft) and covers an area of 16.27 km^{2} (6.28 sq mi) (2025).

== Population ==
Population statistic (10 years)
Year	1995	2005	2015	2025
Count	1996	2080	2262	2196
Difference		+4.20%	+8.75%	−2.91%

Population statistic
Year	2024	2025
Count	2231	2196
Difference		−1.56%

It has a population of 2196 people (31 December 2025).

=== Ethnicity ===
Census 2021 (1+ %)
Ethnicity	Number	Fraction
Slovak	2125	94.99%
Not found out	90	4.02%
Total	2237	

In year 2021 was 2237 people by ethnicity 2125 as Slovak, 90 as Not found out, 21 as Vietnamese, 10 as Czech, 7 as Other, 5 as Hungarian, 4 as German, 3 as Italian, 3 as Romani, 2 as Austrian, 2 as Moravian, 2 as Canadian, 2 as French, 1 as Russian and 1 as Bulgarian.

Note on population: The difference values of population numbers in the table "Population statistic" and in the sections "Ethnicity" & "Religion" is caused by the use of various statistical methods.

=== Religion ===
Census 2021 (1+ %)
Religion	Number	Fraction
Roman Catholic Church	1609	71.93%
None	469	20.97%
Not found out	87	3.89%
Total	2237	

In year 2021 was 2237 people by religion 1609 from Roman Catholic Church, 469 from None, 87 from Not found out, 20 from Evangelical Church, 16 from Christian Congregations in Slovakia, 9 from Seventh-day Adventist Church, 6 from Ad hoc movements, 5 from Other and not ascertained christian church, 4 from Buddhism, 3 from Other, 2 from Greek Catholic Church, 2 from Baptists Church, 1 from Calvinist Church, 1 from Eastern Orthodox Church, 1 from Paganism and natural spirituality, 1 from Jehovah's Witnesses and 1 from Apostolic Church.

== Significant people ==
- Ján Hlubík (*1896 – † 1965), SDB, Roman Catholic priest end religious prisoner (sentenced to 2 years in prison).
- Jozef Forner (*1905 – † 1983), SDB, Roman Catholic priest end Missionary (Japan).
- Ľudovít Koiš (*1935 – † 2012), football player
- Eva Biháryová (*1949 – † 2020), singer and musician

== See also ==
- List of municipalities and towns in Slovakia

== Genealogical resources ==
The records for genealogical research are available at the state archive "Statny Archiv in Bratislava, Slovakia"

- Roman Catholic church records (births/marriages/deaths): 1692-1896 (parish A)
- Lutheran church records (births/marriages/deaths): 1666-1895 (parish B)
