= Lošonec =

- Municipality
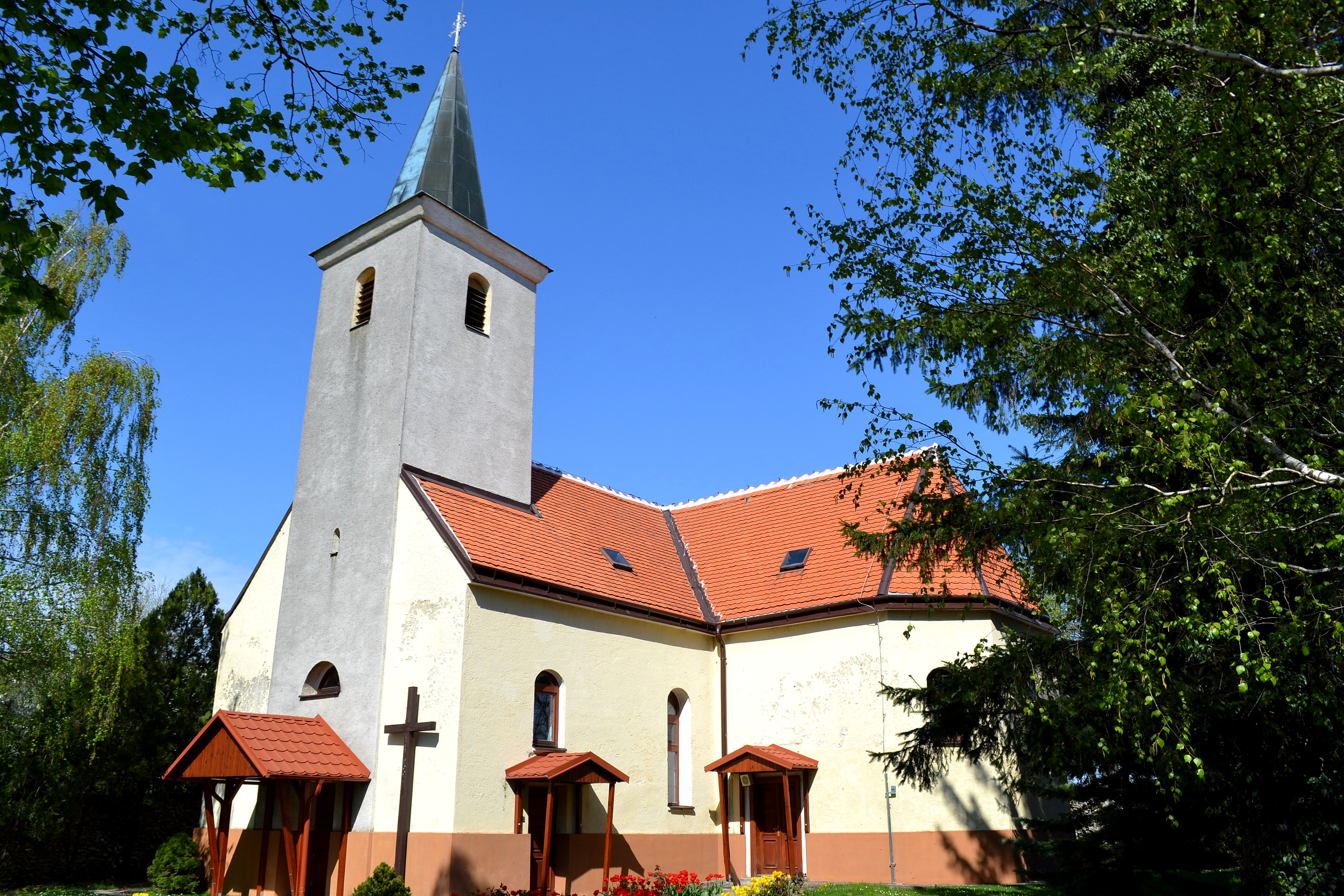

- Flag

- Location of Lošonec in the Trnava Region Location of Lošonec in Slovakia
- Coordinates: 48.48°N 17.40°E
- Country: Slovakia
- Region: Trnava Region
- District: Trnava District
- First mentioned: 1332

Area
  - Total: 23.70 km^{2} (9.15 sq mi)
- Elevation: 254 m (833 ft)

Population (2025)
  - Total: 623
- Time zone: UTC+1 (CET)
  - Summer (DST): UTC+2 (CEST)
- Postal code: 919 04
- Area code: +421 33
- Vehicle registration plate (until 2022): TT
- Website: www.losonec.sk

Lošonec (Hungarian: Kislosonc) is a village and municipality of Trnava District in the Trnava region of Slovakia.

== Geography ==
The municipality lies at an altitude of 254 metres (833 ft) and covers an area of 23.70 km^{2} (9.15 sq mi) (2025).

== Population ==
Population statistic (10 years)
Year	1995	2005	2015	2025
Count	545	527	510	623
Difference		−3.30%	−3.22%	+22.15%

Population statistic
Year	2024	2025
Count	607	623
Difference		+2.63%

It has a population of 623 people (31 December 2025).

=== Ethnicity ===
Census 2021 (1+ %)
Ethnicity	Number	Fraction
Slovak	579	98.46%
Not found out	6	1.02%
Total	588	

In year 2021 was 588 people by ethnicity 579 as Slovak, 6 as Not found out, 4 as Czech, 4 as Hungarian, 4 as Other, 1 as Rusyn and 1 as Croatian.

Note on population: The difference values of population numbers in the table "Population statistic" and in the sections "Ethnicity" & "Religion" is caused by the use of various statistical methods.

=== Religion ===
Census 2021 (1+ %)
Religion	Number	Fraction
Roman Catholic Church	448	76.19%
None	112	19.05%
Not found out	6	1.02%
Total	588	

In year 2021 was 588 people by religion 448 from Roman Catholic Church, 112 from None, 6 from Not found out, 5 from Apostolic Church, 4 from Paganism and natural spirituality, 4 from Christian Congregations in Slovakia, 2 from Other, 2 from Greek Catholic Church, 1 from Old Catholic Church, 1 from Calvinist Church, 1 from Other and not ascertained christian church, 1 from Islam and 1 from Ad hoc movements.
