= Slovenská Nová Ves =

- Municipality
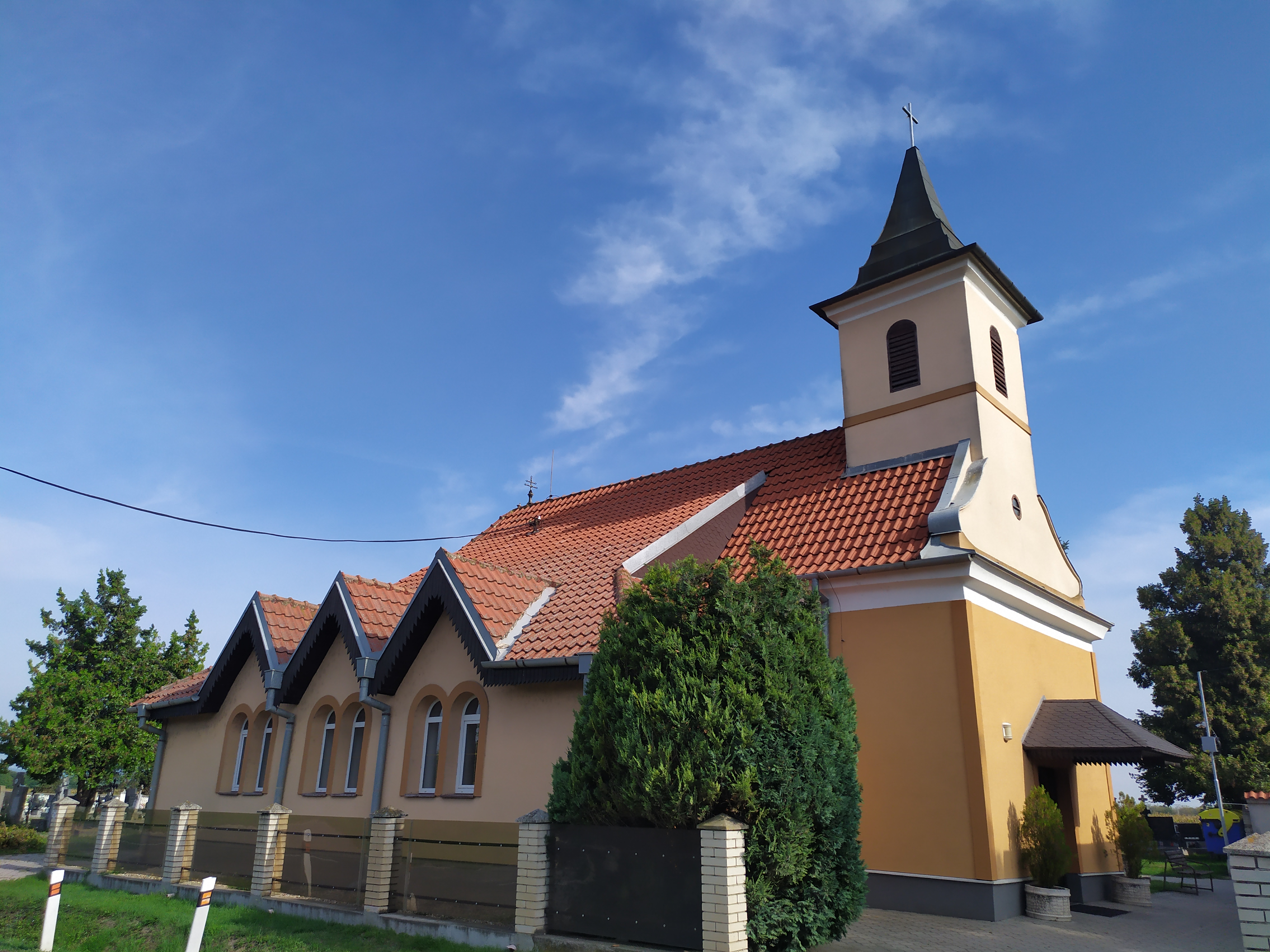

- Flag

- Location of Slovenská Nová Ves in the Trnava Region Location of Slovenská Nová Ves in Slovakia
- Coordinates: 48.30°N 17.53°E
- Country: Slovakia
- Region: Trnava Region
- District: Trnava District
- First mentioned: 1245

Area
  - Total: 8.31 km^{2} (3.21 sq mi)
- Elevation: 136 m (446 ft)

Population (2025)
  - Total: 565
- Time zone: UTC+1 (CET)
  - Summer (DST): UTC+2 (CEST)
- Postal code: 919 42
- Area code: +421 33
- Vehicle registration plate (until 2022): TT
- Website: www.slovenskanovaves.sk

Slovenská Nová Ves (Hungarian: Vedrődújfalu) is a village and municipality of Trnava District in the Trnava region of Slovakia.

== Geography ==
The municipality lies at an altitude of 136 metres (446 ft) and covers an area of 8.31 km^{2} (3.21 sq mi) (2025).

== Population ==
Population statistic (10 years)
Year	1995	2005	2015	2025
Count	445	426	509	565
Difference		−4.26%	+19.48%	+11.00%

Population statistic
Year	2024	2025
Count	555	565
Difference		+1.80%

It has a population of 565 people (31 December 2025).

=== Ethnicity ===
Census 2021 (1+ %)
Ethnicity	Number	Fraction
Slovak	533	97.26%
Not found out	11	2%
Czech	7	1.27%
Total	548	

In year 2021 was 548 people by ethnicity 533 as Slovak, 11 as Not found out, 7 as Czech, 3 as Hungarian, 2 as Other, 1 as Italian and 1 as French.

Note on population: The difference values of population numbers in the table "Population statistic" and in the sections "Ethnicity" & "Religion" is caused by the use of various statistical methods.

=== Religion ===
Census 2021 (1+ %)
Religion	Number	Fraction
Roman Catholic Church	391	71.35%
None	129	23.54%
Not found out	11	2.01%
Evangelical Church	8	1.46%
Total	548	

In year 2021 was 548 people by religion 391 from Roman Catholic Church, 129 from None, 11 from Not found out, 8 from Evangelical Church, 3 from Greek Catholic Church, 3 from Ad hoc movements, 1 from Jewish community, 1 from Christian Congregations in Slovakia and 1 from Buddhism.
