= Dolné Dubové =

- Municipality
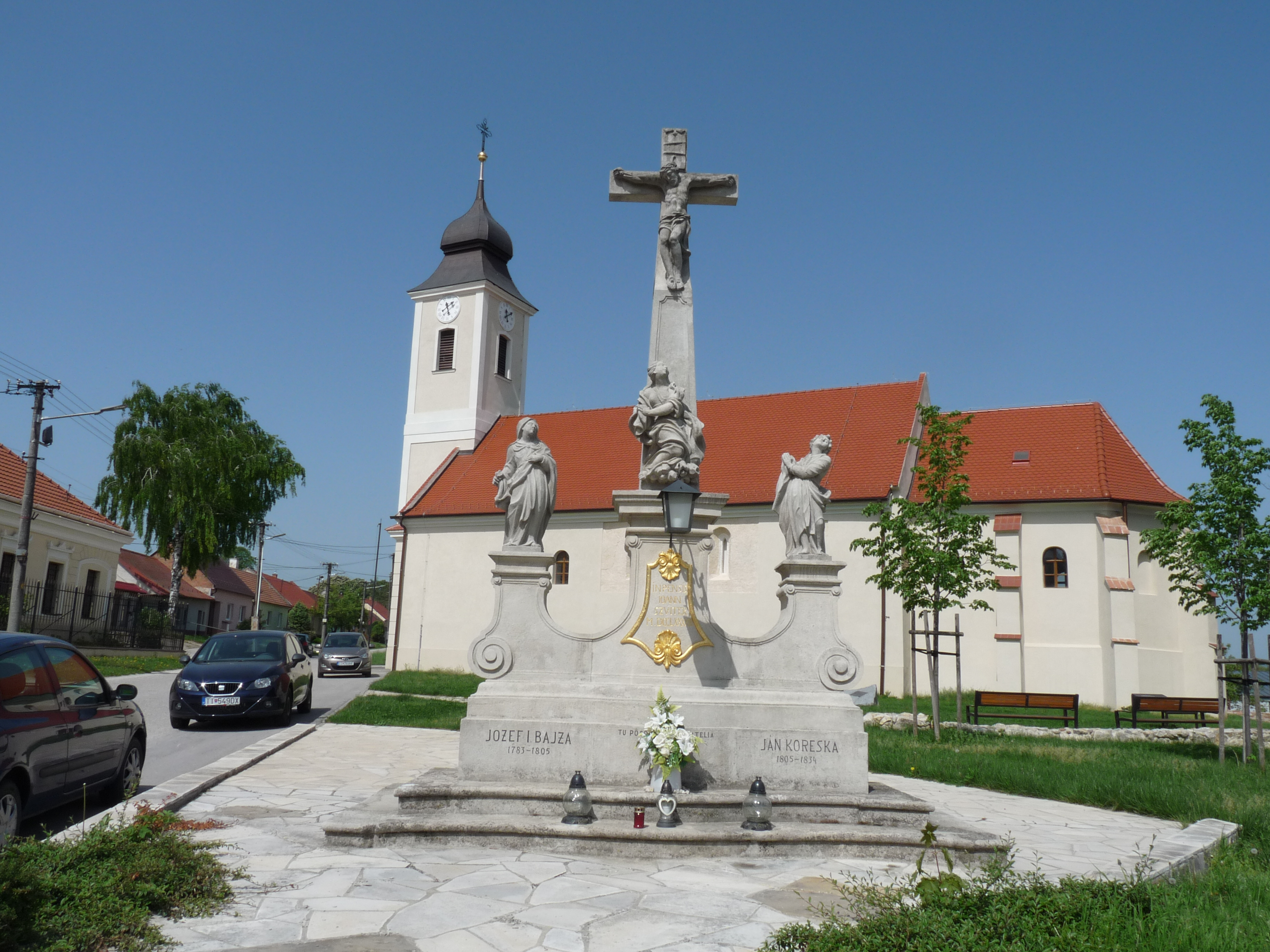

- Flag

- Location of Dolné Dubové in the Trnava Region Location of Dolné Dubové in Slovakia
- Coordinates: 48.48°N 17.62°E
- Country: Slovakia
- Region: Trnava Region
- District: Trnava District
- First mentioned: 1262

Area
  - Total: 10.03 km^{2} (3.87 sq mi)
- Elevation: 183 m (600 ft)

Population (2025)
  - Total: 768
- Time zone: UTC+1 (CET)
  - Summer (DST): UTC+2 (CEST)
- Postal code: 919 52
- Area code: +421 33
- Vehicle registration plate (until 2022): TT
- Website: dolnedubove.sk

Dolné Dubové (Hungarian: Alsódombó) is a village and municipality of Trnava District in the Trnava region of Slovakia.

== Geography ==
The municipality lies at an altitude of 183 metres (600 ft) and covers an area of 10.03 km^{2} (3.87 sq mi) (2025).

== Population ==
Population statistic (10 years)
Year	1995	2005	2015	2025
Count	630	599	690	768
Difference		−4.92%	+15.19%	+11.30%

Population statistic
Year	2024	2025
Count	765	768
Difference		+0.39%

It has a population of 768 people (31 December 2025).

=== Ethnicity ===
Census 2021 (1+ %)
Ethnicity	Number	Fraction
Slovak	725	98.5%
Czech	9	1.22%
Total	736	

In year 2021 was 736 people by ethnicity 725 as Slovak, 9 as Czech, 3 as Not found out, 2 as Romani, 2 as Russian, 1 as Jewish and 1 as Rusyn.

Note on population: The difference values of population numbers in the table "Population statistic" and in the sections "Ethnicity" & "Religion" is caused by the use of various statistical methods.

=== Religion ===
Census 2021 (1+ %)
Religion	Number	Fraction
Roman Catholic Church	592	80.43%
None	121	16.44%
Total	736	

In year 2021 was 736 people by religion 592 from Roman Catholic Church, 121 from None, 4 from Other, 4 from Ad hoc movements, 2 from Other and not ascertained christian church, 2 from Not found out, 2 from Christian Congregations in Slovakia, 2 from Church of the Brethren, 1 from Calvinist Church, 1 from Eastern Orthodox Church, 1 from Paganism and natural spirituality, 1 from Hinduism, 1 from Greek Catholic Church, 1 from Evangelical Church and 1 from Buddhism.

== See also ==
- List of municipalities and towns in Slovakia

== Famous people ==
- Anton Mihálik (*1907 – † 1982), SDB, Roman Catholic priest end religious prisoner (sentenced to 6 years in prison).

== Genealogical resources ==
The records for genealogical research are available at the state archive "Statny Archiv in Bratislava, Slovakia"

- Roman Catholic church records (births/marriages/deaths): 1843-1897 (parish A)
