= Horné Orešany =

- Municipality
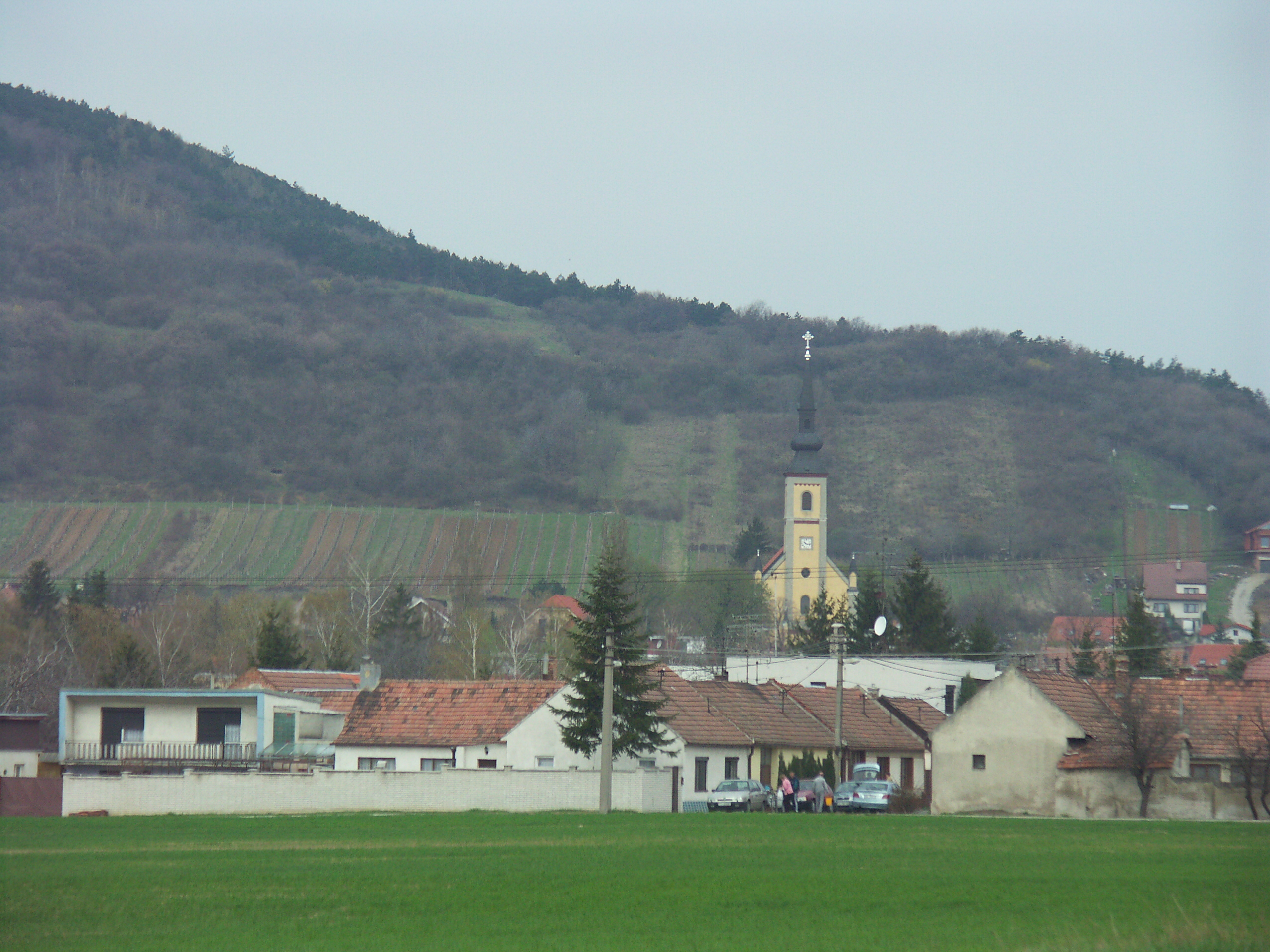

- Flag

- Location of Horné Orešany in the Trnava Region Location of Horné Orešany in Slovakia
- Coordinates: 48.47°N 17.43°E
- Country: Slovakia
- Region: Trnava Region
- District: Trnava District
- First mentioned: 1296

Area
  - Total: 21.56 km^{2} (8.32 sq mi)
- Elevation: 200 m (660 ft)

Population (2025)
  - Total: 1,934
- Time zone: UTC+1 (CET)
  - Summer (DST): UTC+2 (CEST)
- Postal code: 919 03
- Area code: +421 33
- Vehicle registration plate (until 2022): TT
- Website: www.horneoresany.sk

Horné Orešany (Hungarian: Felsődiós) is a village and municipality of the Trnava District in the Trnava region of Slovakia. It is located 16 km from the district capital Trnava and 48 km from Bratislava. A reservoir, also named Horné Orešany, is located nearby. The village is famous for its wine cultivation. A special type of wine Orešanské červené /The Red one from Orešany/ is a local and national wine speciality.

== Geography ==
The municipality lies at an altitude of 200 metres (660 ft) and covers an area of 21.56 km^{2} (8.32 sq mi) (2025).

== Population ==
Population statistic (10 years)
Year	1995	2005	2015	2025
Count	1803	1847	1890	1934
Difference		+2.44%	+2.32%	+2.32%

Population statistic
Year	2024	2025
Count	1919	1934
Difference		+0.78%

It has a population of 1934 people (31 December 2025).

=== Ethnicity ===
Census 2021 (1+ %)
Ethnicity	Number	Fraction
Slovak	1883	97.36%
Not found out	43	2.22%
Total	1934	

In year 2021 was 1934 people by ethnicity 1883 as Slovak, 43 as Not found out, 13 as Czech, 6 as Other, 3 as Rusyn, 3 as Hungarian, 2 as Romanian, 1 as Jewish, 1 as Ukrainian, 1 as Italian, 1 as Romani, 1 as Russian, 1 as Austrian, 1 as Polish and 1 as Bulgarian.

Note on population: The difference values of population numbers in the table "Population statistic" and in the sections "Ethnicity" & "Religion" is caused by the use of various statistical methods.

=== Religion ===
Census 2021 (1+ %)
Religion	Number	Fraction
Roman Catholic Church	1420	73.42%
None	419	21.66%
Not found out	39	2.02%
Total	1934	

In year 2021 was 1934 people by religion 1420 from Roman Catholic Church, 419 from None, 39 from Not found out, 15 from Evangelical Church, 13 from Greek Catholic Church, 7 from Calvinist Church, 6 from Other, 5 from Ad hoc movements, 2 from Eastern Orthodox Church, 2 from Church of the Brethren, 2 from Buddhism, 1 from Paganism and natural spirituality, 1 from Other and not ascertained christian church, 1 from Jehovah's Witnesses and 1 from Christian Congregations in Slovakia.

== Famous people ==
- František Zaťko (1896 – 1984), SDB, Roman Catholic priest end Missionary (United States).

== See also ==
- List of municipalities and towns in Slovakia

== Genealogical resources ==
The records for genealogical research are available at the state archive "Statny Archiv in Bratislava, Slovakia"

- Roman Catholic church records (births/marriages/deaths): 1684-1896 (parish A)
- Lutheran church records (births/marriages/deaths): 1666-1895 (parish B)
