= Horná Krupá =

- Municipality
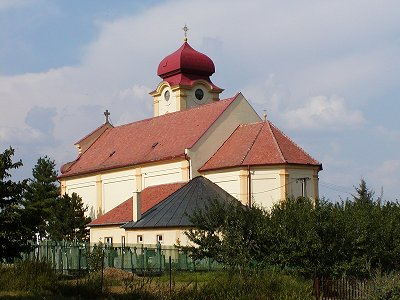

- Flag

- Location of Horná Krupá in the Trnava Region Location of Horná Krupá in Slovakia
- Coordinates: 48.52°N 17.53°E
- Country: Slovakia
- Region: Trnava Region
- District: Trnava District
- First mentioned: 1256

Area
  - Total: 8.65 km^{2} (3.34 sq mi)
- Elevation: 216 m (709 ft)

Population (2025)
  - Total: 488
- Time zone: UTC+1 (CET)
  - Summer (DST): UTC+2 (CEST)
- Postal code: 919 65
- Area code: +421 33
- Vehicle registration plate (until 2022): TT
- Website: hornakrupa.sk

Horná Krupá (Hungarian: Felsőkorompa) is a village and municipality of Trnava District in the Trnava region of Slovakia.

== Geography ==
The municipality lies at an altitude of 216 metres (709 ft) and covers an area of 8.65 km^{2} (3.34 sq mi) (2025).

== Population ==
Population statistic (10 years)
Year	1995	2005	2015	2025
Count	569	509	486	488
Difference		−10.54%	−4.51%	+0.41%

Population statistic
Year	2024	2025
Count	492	488
Difference		−0.81%

It has a population of 488 people (31 December 2025).

=== Ethnicity ===
Census 2021 (1+ %)
Ethnicity	Number	Fraction
Slovak	472	96.72%
Not found out	12	2.45%
Total	488	

In year 2021 was 488 people by ethnicity 472 as Slovak, 12 as Not found out, 3 as Czech, 1 as Romanian and 1 as Moravian.

Note on population: The difference values of population numbers in the table "Population statistic" and in the sections "Ethnicity" & "Religion" is caused by the use of various statistical methods.

=== Religion ===
Census 2021 (1+ %)
Religion	Number	Fraction
Roman Catholic Church	403	82.58%
None	65	13.32%
Not found out	11	2.25%
Total	488	

In year 2021 was 488 people by religion 403 from Roman Catholic Church, 65 from None, 11 from Not found out, 3 from Evangelical Church, 2 from Greek Catholic Church, 2 from Ad hoc movements, 1 from Seventh-day Adventist Church and 1 from Buddhism.

== Genealogical resources ==
The records for genealogical research are available at the state archive "Statny Archiv in Bratislava, Slovakia"

- Roman Catholic church records (births/marriages/deaths): 1689-1895 (parish B)

== See also ==
- List of municipalities and towns in Slovakia
