= Radošovce, Trnava District =

Radošovce
- Municipality
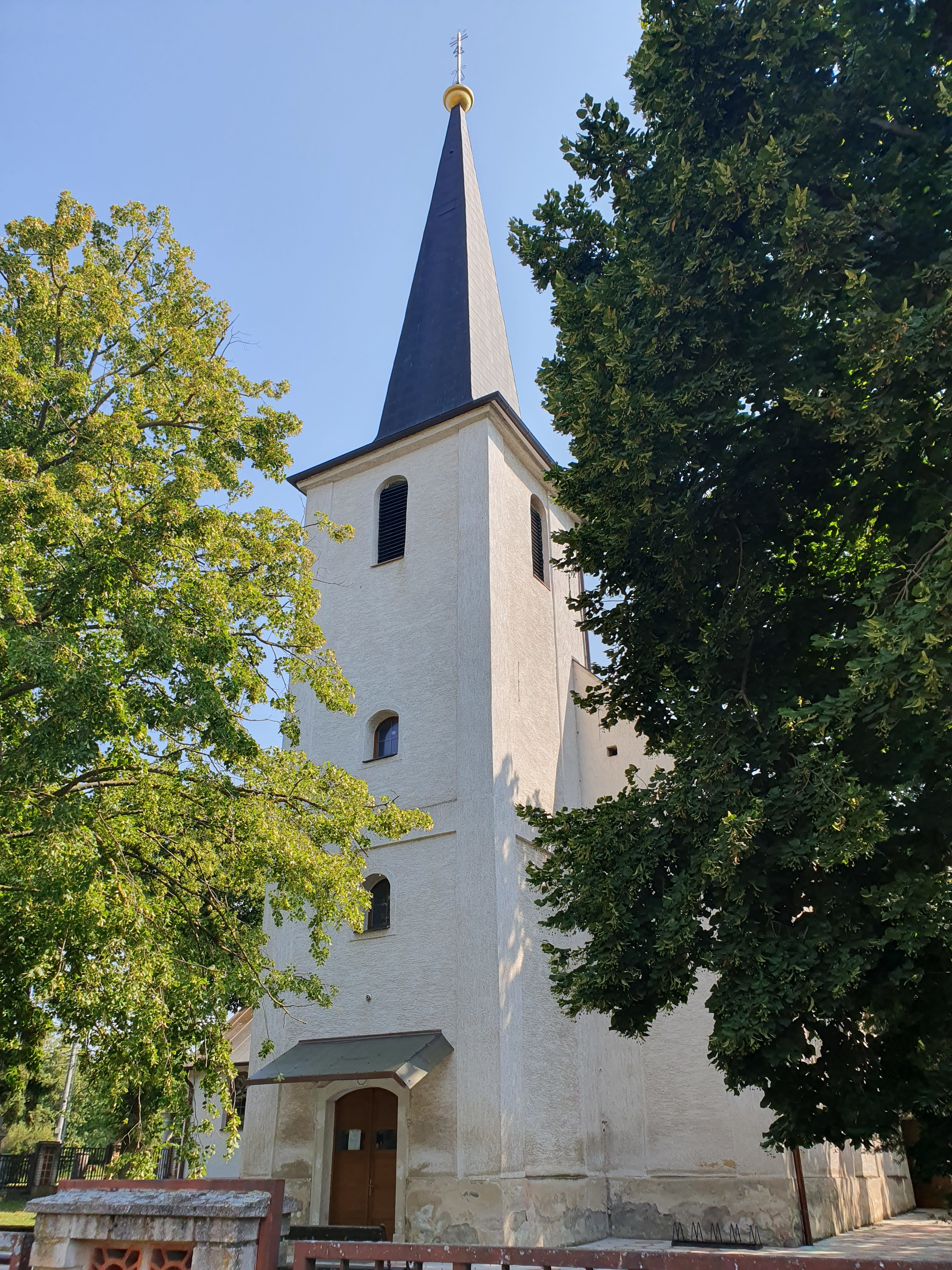

- Flag

- Location of Radošovce in the Trnava Region Location of Radošovce in Slovakia
- Coordinates: 48°29′42″N 17°38′21″E
- Country: Slovakia
- Region: Trnava Region
- District: Trnava District
- First mentioned: 1216

Area
  - Total: 7.28 km^{2} (2.81 sq mi)
- Elevation: 168 m (551 ft)

Population (2025)
  - Total: 383
- Time zone: UTC+1 (CET)
  - Summer (DST): UTC+2 (CEST)
- Postal code: 919 30
- Area code: +421 33
- Vehicle registration plate (until 2022): TT
- Website: www.radosovcett.sk

Radošovce (Hungarian: Alsórados) is a village and municipality of Trnava District in the Trnava region of Slovakia.

== Population ==
Population statistic (10 years)
| Year | 1995 | 2005 | 2015 | 2025 |
|---|---|---|---|---|
| Count | 394 | 399 | 401 | 383 |
| Difference | | +1.26% | +0.50% | −4.48% |

Population statistic
| Year | 2024 | 2025 |
|---|---|---|
| Count | 388 | 383 |
| Difference | | −1.28% |

It has a population of 383 people (31 December 2025).

=== Ethnicity ===
Census 2021 (1+ %)
| Ethnicity | Number | Fraction |
|---|---|---|
| Slovak | 404 | 97.34% |
| Not found out | 8 | 1.92% |
| Czech | 5 | 1.2% |
| Total | 415 | |

In year 2021 was 415 people by ethnicity 404 as Slovak, 8 as Not found out, 5 as Czech, 2 as Bulgarian, 1 as Romani, 1 as Polish, 1 as German and 1 as Other.

Note on population: The difference values of population numbers in the table "Population statistic" and in the sections "Ethnicity" & "Religion" is caused by the use of various statistical methods.

=== Religion ===
Census 2021 (1+ %)
| Religion | Number | Fraction |
|---|---|---|
| Roman Catholic Church | 333 | 80.24% |
| None | 62 | 14.94% |
| Not found out | 9 | 2.17% |
| Other | 5 | 1.2% |
| Total | 415 | |

In year 2021 was 415 people by religion 333 from Roman Catholic Church, 62 from None, 9 from Not found out, 5 from Other, 4 from Ad hoc movements, 1 from Eastern Orthodox Church and 1 from Evangelical Church.
