= Číčovské mŕtve rameno =

Coordinates: 47.77535°N 17.73318°E

- IUCN category IV (habitat/species management area)
- Interactive map of Číčovské mŕtve rameno
- Area: 0.798715 km^{2} (0.308386 sq mi)
- Established: 1964
- Governing body: ŠOP - S-CHKO Dunajské luhy

Číčovské mŕtve rameno is a national nature reserve in the Slovak municipalities of Kľúčovec and Číčov in the Dunajská Streda and Komárno District. The nature reserve covers an area of 79.8715 ha of the Danube floodplain area. The protective zone is 55.2553 ha. It has a protection level of 4 and 5 under the Slovak nature protection system. The nature reserve is part of the Dunajské luhy Protected Landscape Area.

== Description ==
The remainder of a dead branch of the Danube river which forms the nature reserve protects various water biotopes, rare waterfowl, aquatic plants and a glacial relict, the tundra vole. The area is significant, as an esthetic and research object.
