= Potônske Lúky =

Village and municipality in Slovakia

Potônske Lúky Patonyrét
- Municipality
- Location of Potônske Lúky in the Trnava Region Location of Potônske Lúky in Slovakia
- Coordinates: 48.05°N 17.35°E
- Country: Slovakia
- Region: Trnava Region
- District: Dunajská Streda District
- Established: 2002

Area
  - Total: 0.00 km^{2} (0 sq mi)
- Elevation: 116 m (381 ft)

Population (2025)
  - Total: 286
- Time zone: UTC+1 (CET)
  - Summer (DST): UTC+2 (CEST)
- Postal code: 930 52
- Area code: +421 31
- Vehicle registration plate (until 2022): DS
- Website: www.potonske-luky.sk

Potônske Lúky (Hungarian: Patonyrét) is a village and municipality in Dunajská Streda District in the Trnava Region of Slovakia.

== History ==
The village was created in 2002 from the northern, isolated parts of Horná Potôň municipality, near the Malý Dunaj river.

== See also ==
- List of municipalities and towns in Slovakia
