= Blažov =

Blažov may refer to the following places in Slovakia:

- Blažov, a village in Kútniky municipality
- Blažov (Javorina), a former municipality
