= Čenkovce =

Čenkovce Csenke
- Municipality
- Flag

- Location of Čenkovce in the Trnava Region Location of Čenkovce in Slovakia
- Coordinates: 48.10°N 17.43°E
- Country: Slovakia
- Region: Trnava Region
- District: Dunajská Streda District
- First mentioned: 1211

Government
  - Mayor: József Karika

Area
  - Total: 5.54 km^{2} (2.14 sq mi)
- Elevation: 123 m (404 ft)

Population (2025)
  - Total: 1,092

Ethnicity
  - Hungarians: 90,91%
  - Slovaks: 8,23%
- Time zone: UTC+1 (CET)
  - Summer (DST): UTC+2 (CEST)
- Postal code: 930 39
- Area code: +421 31
- Vehicle registration plate (until 2022): DS
- Website: www.cenkovce.sk

Čenkovce (Hungarian: Csenke, pronounced [ˈt͡ʃɛnkɛ]) is a village and municipality in the Dunajská Streda District in the Trnava Region of south-west Slovakia.

== Geography ==
The municipality lies at an altitude of 123 metres (404 ft) and covers an area of 5.54 km^{2} (2.14 sq mi) (2025).

== History ==
In the 9th century, the territory of Čenkovce became part of the Kingdom of Hungary. In historical records the village was first mentioned in 1240. After the Austro-Hungarian army disintegrated in November 1918, Czechoslovak troops occupied the area, later acknowledged internationally by the Treaty of Trianon. Between 1938 and 1945 Čenkovce once more became part of Miklós Horthy's Hungary through the First Vienna Award. From 1945 until the Velvet Divorce, it was part of Czechoslovakia. Since then it has been part of Slovakia.

== Population ==
Population statistic (10 years)
Year	1995	2005	2015	2025
Count	849	823	1061	1092
Difference		−3.06%	+28.91%	+2.92%

Population statistic
Year	2024	2025
Count	1095	1092
Difference		−0.27%

It has a population of 1092 people (31 December 2025).

=== Ethnicity ===
Census 2021 (1+ %)
Ethnicity	Number	Fraction
Hungarian	871	79.76%
Slovak	235	21.52%
Not found out	53	4.85%
Total	1092	

In year 2021 was 1092 people by ethnicity 871 as Hungarian, 235 as Slovak, 53 as Not found out, 5 as Czech, 2 as Ukrainian, 2 as Moravian, 1 as Italian and 1 as German.

Note on population: The difference values of population numbers in the table "Population statistic" and in the sections "Ethnicity" & "Religion" is caused by the use of various statistical methods.

=== Religion ===
Census 2021 (1+ %)
Religion	Number	Fraction
Roman Catholic Church	845	77.38%
None	155	14.19%
Not found out	41	3.75%
Calvinist Church	19	1.74%
Evangelical Church	17	1.56%
Total	1092	

In year 2021 was 1092 people by religion 845 from Roman Catholic Church, 155 from None, 41 from Not found out, 19 from Calvinist Church, 17 from Evangelical Church, 5 from Greek Catholic Church, 4 from Christian Congregations in Slovakia, 2 from Other and not ascertained christian church, 2 from Other, 1 from Eastern Orthodox Church and 1 from Paganism and natural spirituality.

== See also ==
- List of municipalities and towns in Slovakia

== Genealogical resources ==
The records for genealogical research are available at the state archive "Statny Archiv in Bratislava, Slovakia"

- Roman Catholic church records (births/marriages/deaths): 1673-1897 (parish B)
- Reformated church records (births/marriages/deaths): 1784-1910 (parish B)
