= Boheľov =

Boheľov Bögellő
- Municipality
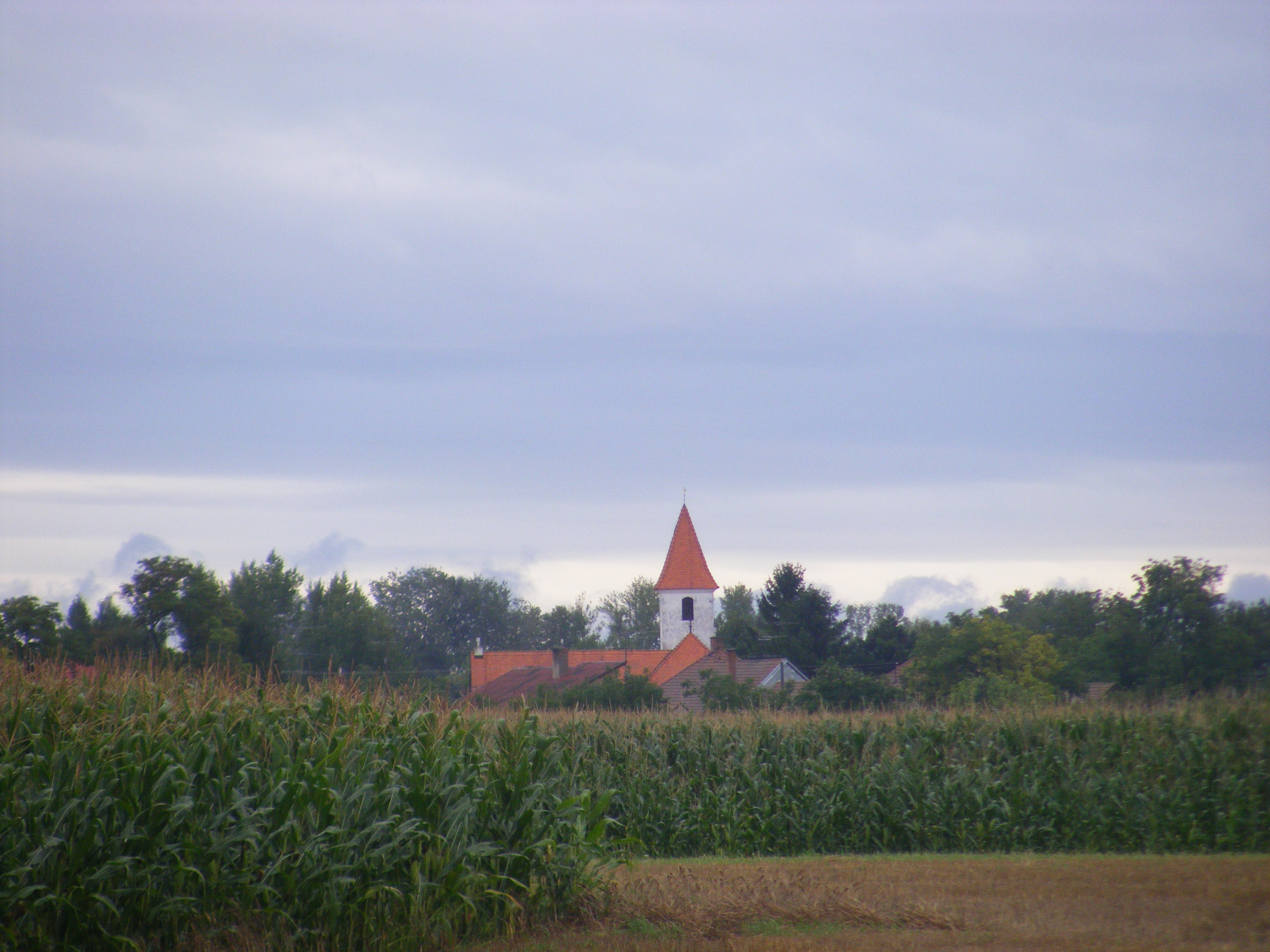

- Flag

- Location of Boheľov in the Trnava Region Location of Boheľov in Slovakia
- Coordinates: 47.92°N 17.70°E
- Country: Slovakia
- Region: Trnava Region
- District: Dunajská Streda District
- First mentioned: 1456

Government
  - Mayor: Mária Kázmér (Party of the Hungarian Coalition)

Area
  - Total: 8.26 km^{2} (3.19 sq mi)
- Elevation: 112 m (367 ft)

Population (2025)
  - Total: 359

Ethnicity
  - Hungarians: 97.77%
  - Slovaks: 0.84%
- Time zone: UTC+1 (CET)
  - Summer (DST): UTC+2 (CEST)
- Postal code: 930 10
- Area code: +421 31
- Vehicle registration plate (until 2022): DS
- Website: www.bohelov.sk

Boheľov (Hungarian: Bögellő, pronounced [ˈbøɡɛlːøː]) is a village and municipality in the Dunajská Streda District in the Trnava Region of south-west Slovakia.

== Geography ==
The municipality lies at an altitude of 112 metres (367 ft) and covers an area of 8.26 km^{2} (3.19 sq mi) (2025).

== History ==
In the 9th century, the territory of Boheľov became part of the Kingdom of Hungary. After the Austro-Hungarian army disintegrated in November 1918, Czechoslovak troops occupied the area, later acknowledged internationally by the Treaty of Trianon. Between 1938 and 1945 Boheľov once more became part of Miklós Horthy's Hungary through the First Vienna Award. From 1945 until the Velvet Divorce, it was part of Czechoslovakia. Since then it has been part of Slovakia.

== See also ==
- List of municipalities and towns in Slovakia

== Population ==
Population statistic (10 years)
Year	1995	2005	2015	2025
Count	370	365	345	359
Difference		−1.35%	−5.47%	+4.05%

Population statistic
Year	2024	2025
Count	355	359
Difference		+1.12%

It has a population of 359 people (31 December 2025).

=== Ethnicity ===
Census 2021 (1+ %)
Ethnicity	Number	Fraction
Hungarian	293	85.42%
Slovak	53	15.45%
Not found out	9	2.62%
Total	343	

In year 2021 was 343 people by ethnicity 293 as Hungarian, 53 as Slovak, 9 as Not found out and 1 as Romani.

Note on population: The difference values of population numbers in the table "Population statistic" and in the sections "Ethnicity" & "Religion" is caused by the use of various statistical methods.

=== Religion ===
Census 2021 (1+ %)
Religion	Number	Fraction
Calvinist Church	146	42.57%
Roman Catholic Church	122	35.57%
None	56	16.33%
Not found out	10	2.92%
Evangelical Church	5	1.46%
Total	343	

In year 2021 was 343 people by religion 146 from Calvinist Church, 122 from Roman Catholic Church, 56 from None, 10 from Not found out, 5 from Evangelical Church, 1 from Other and not ascertained christian church, 1 from Other, 1 from Greek Catholic Church and 1 from Apostolic Church.

== Genealogical resources ==
The records for genealogical research are available at the state archive "Statny Archiv in Bratislava, Slovakia"

- Roman Catholic church records (births/marriages/deaths): 1713-1905 (parish B)
- Reformated church records (births/marriages/deaths): 1784-1902 (parish B)
