= Macov =

Macov Macháza
- Municipality
- Flag

- Location of Macov in the Trnava Region Location of Macov in Slovakia
- Coordinates: 48.02°N 17.43°E
- Country: Slovakia
- Region: Trnava Region
- District: Dunajská Streda District
- First mentioned: 1367

Government
  - Mayor: Ľudmila Láníková (SMER)

Area
  - Total: 2.72 km^{2} (1.05 sq mi)
- Elevation: 123 m (404 ft)

Population (2025)
  - Total: 537

Ethnicity
  - Hungarians: 56,77 %
  - Slovaks: 23,87 %
- Time zone: UTC+1 (CET)
  - Summer (DST): UTC+2 (CEST)
- Postal code: 930 32
- Area code: +421 31
- Vehicle registration plate (until 2022): DS
- Website: ocu-macov.sk/index.php/sk/

Macov (Hungarian: Macháza, pronounced [ˈmɒtshaːzɒ]) is a village and municipality in the Dunajská Streda District in the Trnava Region of south-west Slovakia.

== Geography ==
The municipality lies at an altitude of 123 metres (404 ft) and covers an area of 2.72 km^{2} (1.05 sq mi) (2025).

== History ==
In the 9th century, the territory of Macov became part of the Kingdom of Hungary. The village was first recorded in 1367 by its Hungarian name as Machhaza. Until the end of World War I, it was part of Hungary and fell within the Somorja district of Pozsony County. After the Austro-Hungarian army disintegrated in November 1918, Czechoslovak troops occupied the area. After the Treaty of Trianon of 1920, the village became officially part of Czechoslovakia. In November 1938, the First Vienna Award granted the area to Hungary and it was held by Hungary until 1945. After Soviet occupation in 1945, Czechoslovak administration returned and the village became officially part of Czechoslovakia in 1945.

== Population ==
Population statistic (10 years)
Year	1995	2005	2015	2025
Count	149	181	309	537
Difference		+21.47%	+70.71%	+73.78%

Population statistic
Year	2024	2025
Count	504	537
Difference		+6.54%

It has a population of 537 people (31 December 2025).

In 1910, the village had 142, in 2001 was 155.

=== Ethnicity ===
Census 2021 (1+ %)
Ethnicity	Number	Fraction
Slovak	299	67.04%
Hungarian	116	26%
Czech	28	6.27%
Other	15	3.36%
Not found out	13	2.91%
Total	446	

In year 2021 was 446 people by ethnicity 299 as Slovak, 116 as Hungarian, 28 as Czech, 15 as Other, 13 as Not found out, 3 as Rusyn, 1 as Romani and 1 as Croatian.

Note on population: The difference values of population numbers in the table "Population statistic" and in the sections "Ethnicity" & "Religion" is caused by the use of various statistical methods.

=== Religion ===
Census 2021 (1+ %)
Religion	Number	Fraction
Roman Catholic Church	240	53.81%
None	158	35.43%
Not found out	16	3.59%
Evangelical Church	11	2.47%
Greek Catholic Church	7	1.57%
Buddhism	6	1.35%
Total	446	

In year 2021 was 446 people by religion 240 from Roman Catholic Church, 158 from None, 16 from Not found out, 11 from Evangelical Church, 7 from Greek Catholic Church, 6 from Buddhism, 3 from Christian Congregations in Slovakia, 2 from Calvinist Church, 1 from Jehovah's Witnesses, 1 from Other and 1 from Czechoslovak Hussite Church.
