= Veľká Paka =

Village in Slovakia

Veľká Paka Nagypaka
- Municipality
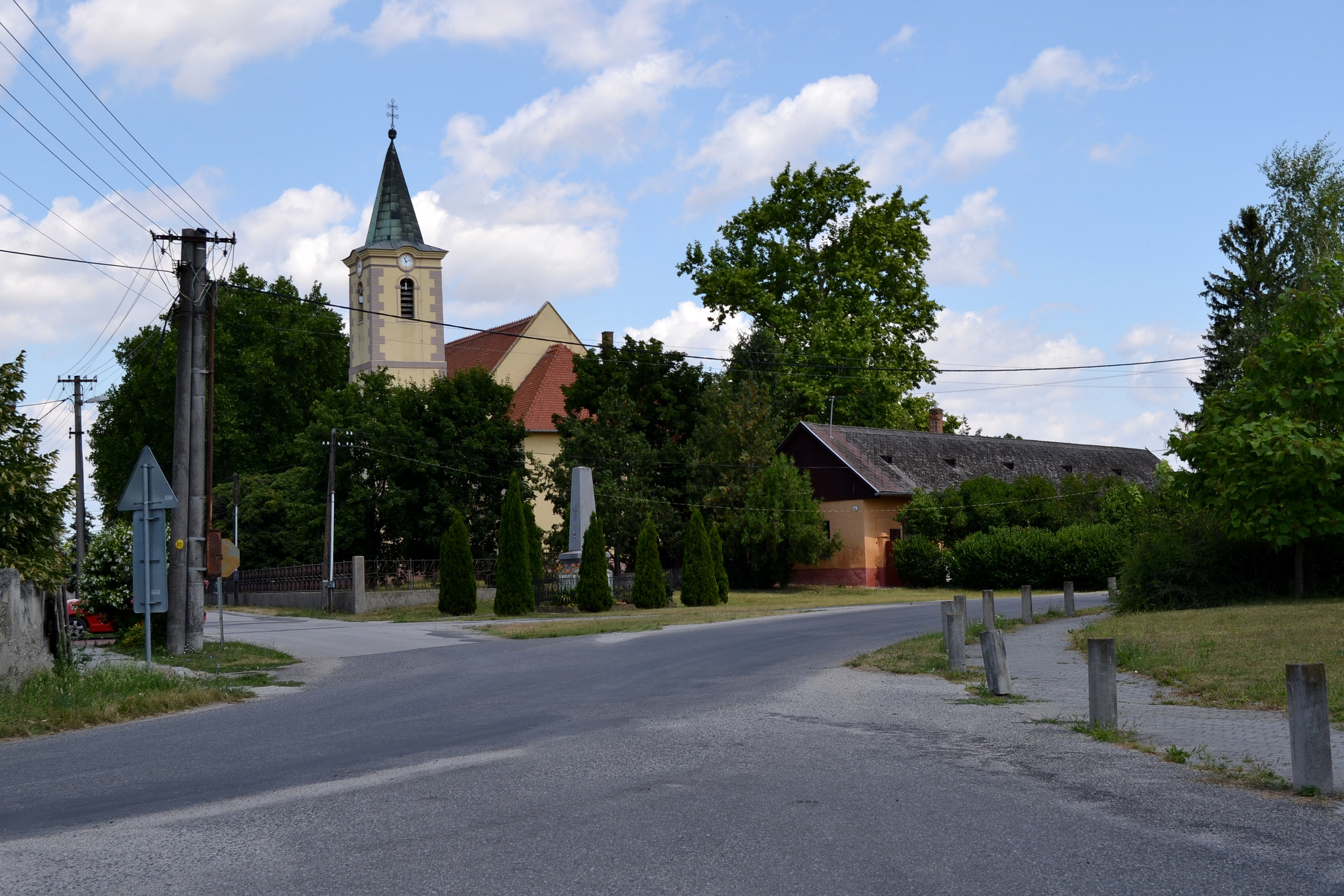

- Flag Coat of arms

- Location of Veľká Paka in the Trnava Region Location of Veľká Paka in Slovakia
- Coordinates: 48.04°N 17.41°E
- Country: Slovakia
- Region: Trnava Region
- District: Dunajská Streda District
- First mentioned: 1205

Government
  - Mayor: Ivan Seňan (SDKÚ-DS, Party of the Hungarian Coalition)

Area
  - Total: 16.46 km^{2} (6.36 sq mi)
- Elevation: 123 m (404 ft)

Population (2025)
  - Total: 1,099

Ethnicity
  - Hungarians: 55,62%
  - Slovaks: 42,31%
- Time zone: UTC+1 (CET)
  - Summer (DST): UTC+2 (CEST)
- Postal code: 930 51
- Area code: +421 31
- Vehicle registration plate (until 2022): DS
- Website: www.velkapaka.sk

Veľká Paka (Hungarian: Nagypaka, pronounced [ˈnɒɟpɒkɒ]) is a village and municipality in the Dunajská Streda District in the Trnava Region of south-west Slovakia.

== Component villages ==
In Slovak	In Hungarian
Veľká Paka	Nagypaka
Čukárska Paka	Csukárpaka
Malá Paka	Kispaka

== Geography ==
The municipality lies at an altitude of 123 metres (404 ft) and covers an area of 16.46 km^{2} (6.36 sq mi) (2025).

== History ==
In the 9th century, the territory of Veľká Paka became part of the Kingdom of Hungary. The village was first recorded in 1205 as Paka. Until the end of World War I, it was part of Hungary and fell within the Somorja district of Pozsony County. After the Austro-Hungarian army disintegrated in November 1918, Czechoslovak troops occupied the area. After the Treaty of Trianon of 1920, the village became officially part of Czechoslovakia. In November 1938, the First Vienna Award granted the area to Hungary and it was held by Hungary until 1945. The present-day municipality was formed in 1940 by unifying the three component villages. After Soviet occupation in 1945, Czechoslovak administration returned and the village became officially part of Czechoslovakia in 1945.

Sepulchral artefacts were found in Veľká Paka from the Bronze Age.

== Landmarks ==
The village has a modern cultural house and a motel.

An important sacral historical building is the Church of St. Ladislaus. It is a Roman Catholic church, built from 1317 to 1678.

== Population ==
Population statistic (10 years)
Year	1995	2005	2015	2025
Count	654	757	942	1099
Difference		+15.74%	+24.43%	+16.66%

Population statistic
Year	2024	2025
Count	1062	1099
Difference		+3.48%

It has a population of 1099 people (31 December 2025).

=== Ethnicity ===
Census 2021 (1+ %)
Ethnicity	Number	Fraction
Slovak	627	63.71%
Hungarian	379	38.51%
Not found out	24	2.43%
Total	984	

In year 2021 was 984 people by ethnicity 627 as Slovak, 379 as Hungarian, 24 as Not found out, 7 as Other, 5 as Czech, 4 as Serbian, 2 as Russian, 2 as Polish, 1 as Rusyn and 1 as Albanian.

Note on population: The difference values of population numbers in the table "Population statistic" and in the sections "Ethnicity" & "Religion" is caused by the use of various statistical methods.

=== Religion ===
Census 2021 (1+ %)
Religion	Number	Fraction
Roman Catholic Church	574	58.33%
None	260	26.42%
Evangelical Church	69	7.01%
Calvinist Church	21	2.13%
Not found out	19	1.93%
Total	984	

In year 2021 was 984 people by religion 574 from Roman Catholic Church, 260 from None, 69 from Evangelical Church, 21 from Calvinist Church, 19 from Not found out, 8 from Christian Congregations in Slovakia, 8 from Greek Catholic Church, 4 from Eastern Orthodox Church, 4 from Jehovah's Witnesses, 4 from Ad hoc movements, 3 from Buddhism, 2 from Jewish community, 2 from Other and not ascertained christian church, 2 from Other, 2 from United Methodist Church, 1 from Islam and 1 from Baptists Church.

At the census 2011 has village 879 people: 473 (54%) Slovaks, 335 (38%) Hungarians and 71 (8%) others nationality. In 1910, the village had 322, for the most part, Hungarian inhabitants. At the 2001 Census the recorded population was 676, at the 2008 811 people. 42.31 % is Roman Catholicism is the majority religion of the village, its adherents numbering 74.26% of the total population.

== Sports ==
The village has a football club, named Druzstievnik F.C. Veľká Paka which has an A team and a Junior Team. It plays in the 7. league of the western-Slovak football Association (ZSFZ).
