= Povoda =

Povoda Pódatejed
- Municipality
- Flag

- Location of Povoda in the Trnava Region Location of Povoda in Slovakia
- Coordinates: 47.97°N 17.64°E
- Country: Slovakia
- Region: Trnava Region
- District: Dunajská Streda District
- First mentioned: 1380

Government
  - Mayor: Sándor Csóka (Ind.)

Area
  - Total: 6.01 km^{2} (2.32 sq mi)
- Elevation: 115 m (377 ft)

Population (2025)
  - Total: 961

Ethnicity
  - Hungarians: 78,61 %
  - Slovaks: 18,24 %
- Time zone: UTC+1 (CET)
  - Summer (DST): UTC+2 (CEST)
- Postal code: 929 01
- Area code: +421 31
- Vehicle registration plate (until 2022): DS
- Website: obecpovoda.sk/hu/

Povoda (Hungarian: Pódatejed, pronounced [ˈpoːdɒtɛjɛd]) is a village and municipality in the Dunajská Streda District in the Trnava Region of south-west Slovakia.

== Geography ==
The municipality lies at an altitude of 115 metres (377 ft) and covers an area of 6.01 km^{2} (2.32 sq mi) (2025).

== Component villages ==
| In Slovak | In Hungarian |
|---|---|
| Lidér Tejed | Lidértejed |
| Podafa | Pódafa |
| Čenkesfa | Csenkeszfa |

== History ==
The municipality was organised in 1940, when its component villages were unified under the Hungarian name Pódafa, which was Slovakized as Povoda in 1948. Until the end of World War I, all three component villages were part of Hungary and fell within the Somorja district of Pozsony County. After the Austro-Hungarian army disintegrated in November 1918, Czechoslovak troops occupied the area. After the Treaty of Trianon of 1920, the villages became officially part of Czechoslovakia. In November 1938, the First Vienna Award granted the area to Hungary and it was held by Hungary until 1945. After Soviet occupation in 1945, Czechoslovak administration returned and the villages became officially part of Czechoslovakia in 1947.

== Population ==
Population statistic (10 years)
| Year | 1995 | 2005 | 2015 | 2025 |
|---|---|---|---|---|
| Count | 737 | 799 | 917 | 961 |
| Difference | | +8.41% | +14.76% | +4.79% |

Population statistic
| Year | 2024 | 2025 |
|---|---|---|
| Count | 968 | 961 |
| Difference | | −0.72% |

It has a population of 961 people (31 December 2025).

=== Ethnicity ===
Census 2021 (1+ %)
| Ethnicity | Number | Fraction |
|---|---|---|
| Hungarian | 750 | 77.8% |
| Slovak | 224 | 23.23% |
| Not found out | 29 | 3% |
| Czech | 10 | 1.03% |
| Total | 964 | |

In year 2021 was 964 people by ethnicity 750 as Hungarian, 224 as Slovak, 29 as Not found out, 10 as Czech, 2 as German, 2 as Croatian, 1 as Italian and 1 as Russian.

Note on population: The difference values of population numbers in the table "Population statistic" and in the sections "Ethnicity" & "Religion" is caused by the use of various statistical methods.

=== Religion ===
Census 2021 (1+ %)
| Religion | Number | Fraction |
|---|---|---|
| Roman Catholic Church | 687 | 71.27% |
| None | 168 | 17.43% |
| Calvinist Church | 51 | 5.29% |
| Evangelical Church | 25 | 2.59% |
| Not found out | 17 | 1.76% |
| Total | 964 | |

In year 2021 was 964 people by religion 687 from Roman Catholic Church, 168 from None, 51 from Calvinist Church, 25 from Evangelical Church, 17 from Not found out, 5 from Christian Congregations in Slovakia, 2 from Eastern Orthodox Church, 2 from Jehovah's Witnesses, 2 from Greek Catholic Church, 1 from Jewish community, 1 from Old Catholic Church, 1 from Paganism and natural spirituality, 1 from Other and 1 from United Methodist Church.

As of 2001, 78.61% of its population were Hungarians while 18.24% were Slovaks. Roman Catholicism is the majority religion of the village, its adherents numbering 83.20% of the total population.
