= Bellova Ves =

Bellova Ves Vittény
- Municipality
- Flag

- Location of Bellova Ves in the Trnava Region Location of Bellova Ves in Slovakia
- Coordinates: 48.08°N 17.52°E
- Country: Slovakia
- Region: Trnava Region
- District: Dunajská Streda District
- First mentioned: 1951

Government
  - Mayor: Anna Baloghová

Area
  - Total: 6.92 km^{2} (2.67 sq mi)
- Elevation: 119 m (390 ft)

Population (2025)
  - Total: 357

Ethnicity
  - Slovaks: 53.09%
  - Hungarians: 45.06%
- Time zone: UTC+1 (CET)
  - Summer (DST): UTC+2 (CEST)
- Postal code: 930 52
- Area code: +421 31
- Vehicle registration plate (until 2022): DS

Bellova Ves (Hungarian: Vittény, pronounced [ˈvitːeːɲ]) is a village and municipality in the Dunajská Streda District in the Trnava Region of south-west Slovakia.

Census 2011: 229 inhabitants 122 Slovaks, 56 Hungarians and 51 others nationality

== Geography ==
The municipality lies at an altitude of 119 metres (390 ft) and covers an area of 6.92 km^{2} (2.67 sq mi) (2025).

== Population ==
Population statistic (10 years)
Year	1995	2005	2015	2025
Count	166	183	272	357
Difference		+10.24%	+48.63%	+31.25%

Population statistic
Year	2024	2025
Count	365	357
Difference		−2.19%

It has a population of 357 people (31 December 2025).

=== Ethnicity ===
Census 2021 (1+ %)
Ethnicity	Number	Fraction
Slovak	263	80.67%
Hungarian	64	19.63%
Russian	4	1.22%
Total	326	

In year 2021 was 326 people by ethnicity 263 as Slovak, 64 as Hungarian, 4 as Russian, 3 as Czech, 2 as Moravian, 2 as Other, 1 as Serbian, 1 as Rusyn and 1 as Polish.

Note on population: The difference values of population numbers in the table "Population statistic" and in the sections "Ethnicity" & "Religion" is caused by the use of various statistical methods.

=== Religion ===
Census 2021 (1+ %)
Religion	Number	Fraction
None	161	49.39%
Roman Catholic Church	135	41.41%
Evangelical Church	11	3.37%
Not found out	9	2.76%
Christian Congregations in Slovakia	5	1.53%
Total	326	

In year 2021 was 326 people by religion 161 from None, 135 from Roman Catholic Church, 11 from Evangelical Church, 9 from Not found out, 5 from Christian Congregations in Slovakia, 2 from Greek Catholic Church, 1 from Other and not ascertained christian church, 1 from Buddhism and 1 from Ad hoc movements.
