= Rohovce =

Rohovce Nagyszarva
- Municipality
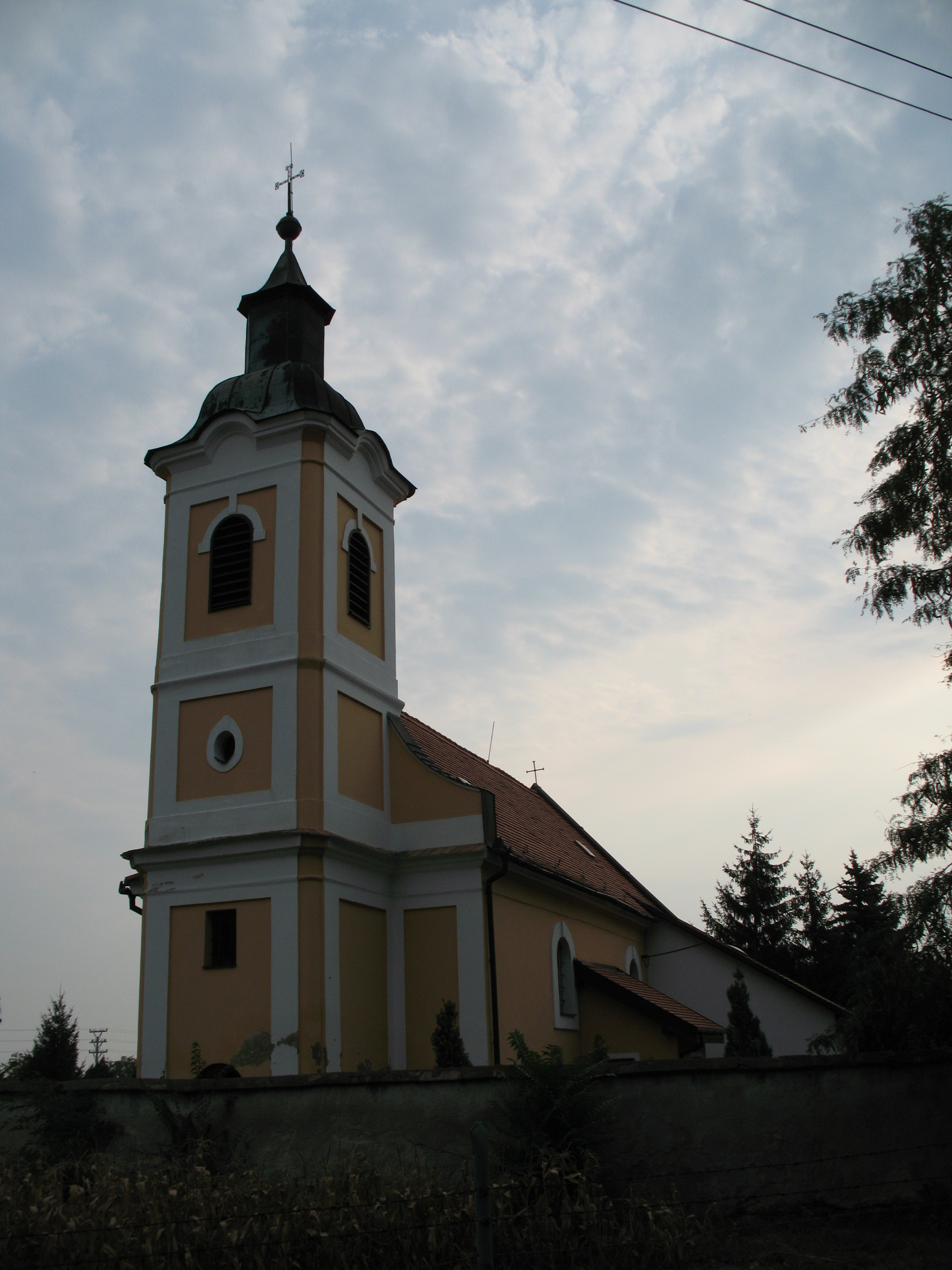

- Flag

- Location of Rohovce in the Trnava Region Location of Rohovce in Slovakia
- Coordinates: 48.00°N 17.41°E
- Country: Slovakia
- Region: Trnava Region
- District: Dunajská Streda District
- First mentioned: 1294

Government
  - Mayor: Jenő Horváth (Ind.)

Area
  - Total: 16.14 km^{2} (6.23 sq mi)
- Elevation: 123 m (404 ft)

Population (2025)
  - Total: 1,072

Ethnicity
  - Hungarians: 87.66 %
  - Slovaks: 11.57 %
- Time zone: UTC+1 (CET)
  - Summer (DST): UTC+2 (CEST)
- Postal code: 930 30
- Area code: +421 31
- Vehicle registration plate (until 2022): DS
- Website: www.rohovce.sk

Rohovce (Hungarian: Nagyszarva, pronounced [ˈnɒɟsɒrvɒ]) is a village and municipality in the Dunajská Streda District in the Trnava Region of south-west Slovakia.

== Geography ==
The municipality lies at an altitude of 123 metres (404 ft) and covers an area of 16.14 km^{2} (6.23 sq mi) (2025).

== History ==
In the 9th century, the territory of Rohovce became part of the Kingdom of Hungary. The village was first recorded in 1250 as Zerva. Until the end of World War I, it was part of Hungary and fell within the Somorja district of Pozsony County. After the Austro-Hungarian army disintegrated in November 1918, Czechoslovak troops occupied the area. After the Treaty of Trianon of 1920, the village became officially part of Czechoslovakia. In November 1938, the First Vienna Award granted the area to Hungary and it was held by Hungary until 1945. After Soviet occupation in 1945, Czechoslovak administration returned and the village became officially part of Czechoslovakia in 1947. Its Slovak name first became Velka Sarva, which was changed by the authorities to the current official name in 1948.

== Population ==
Population statistic (10 years)
Year	1995	2005	2015	2025
Count	1022	1084	1204	1072
Difference		+6.06%	+11.07%	−10.96%

Population statistic
Year	2024	2025
Count	1073	1072
Difference		−0.09%

It has a population of 1072 people (31 December 2025).

In 1910, the village had 448, for the most part, Hungarian inhabitants.

=== Ethnicity ===
Census 2021 (1+ %)
Ethnicity	Number	Fraction
Hungarian	859	77.52%
Slovak	262	23.64%
Not found out	37	3.33%
Total	1108	

In year 2021 was 1108 people by ethnicity 859 as Hungarian, 262 as Slovak, 37 as Not found out, 4 as Czech, 4 as Romani, 4 as Other, 2 as Ukrainian, 2 as Russian, 1 as Romanian, 1 as Austrian, 1 as Polish and 1 as French.

Note on population: The difference values of population numbers in the table "Population statistic" and in the sections "Ethnicity" & "Religion" is caused by the use of various statistical methods.

=== Religion ===
Census 2021 (1+ %)
Religion	Number	Fraction
Roman Catholic Church	776	70.04%
None	224	20.22%
Not found out	36	3.25%
Calvinist Church	28	2.53%
Evangelical Church	21	1.9%
Total	1108	

In year 2021 was 1108 people by religion 776 from Roman Catholic Church, 224 from None, 36 from Not found out, 28 from Calvinist Church, 21 from Evangelical Church, 7 from Christian Congregations in Slovakia, 4 from Eastern Orthodox Church, 4 from Greek Catholic Church, 2 from Jewish community, 2 from United Methodist Church, 1 from Other and not ascertained christian church, 1 from Jehovah's Witnesses, 1 from Baptists Church and 1 from Ad hoc movements.
