= Lúč na Ostrove =

Lúč na Ostrove Lúcs
- Municipality
- Flag

- Location of Lúč na Ostrove in the Trnava Region Location of Lúč na Ostrove in Slovakia
- Coordinates: 47.98°N 17.52°E
- Country: Slovakia
- Region: Trnava Region
- District: Dunajská Streda District
- First mentioned: 1248

Government
  - Mayor: László Kiss (Ind.)

Area
  - Total: 15.89 km^{2} (6.14 sq mi)
- Elevation: 118 m (387 ft)

Population (2025)
  - Total: 740

Ethnicity
  - Hungarians: 95.65%
  - Slovaks: 3.80%
- Time zone: UTC+1 (CET)
  - Summer (DST): UTC+2 (CEST)
- Postal code: 930 03
- Area code: +421 31
- Vehicle registration plate (until 2022): DS
- Website: www.lucnaostrove.sk

Lúč na Ostrove (Hungarian: Lúcs, pronounced [ˈluːtʃ]) is a village and municipality in the Dunajská Streda District in the Trnava Region of south-west Slovakia.

== Component villages ==
In Slovak	In Hungarian
Malá Lúč	Kislúcs
Veľká Lúč	Nagylúcs

== Geography ==
The municipality lies at an altitude of 118 metres (387 ft) and covers an area of 15.89 km^{2} (6.14 sq mi) (2025).

== History ==
In the 9th century, the territory of Lúč na Ostrove became part of the Kingdom of Hungary. The name of the village was first recorded in 1248 as Luche. Until the end of World War I, the villages forming the present-day municipality were part of Hungary and fell within the Dunaszerdahely district of Pozsony County. After the Austro-Hungarian army disintegrated in November 1918, Czechoslovak troops occupied the area. After the Treaty of Trianon of 1920, the villages became officially part of Czechoslovakia. In November 1938, the First Vienna Award granted the area to Hungary and it was held by Hungary until 1945. After Soviet occupation in 1945, Czechoslovak administration returned and the village became officially part of Czechoslovakia in 1947. The present-day municipality was formed from its two component villages in 1960.

== Population ==
Population statistic (10 years)
Year	1995	2005	2015	2025
Count	724	747	719	740
Difference		+3.17%	−3.74%	+2.92%

Population statistic
Year	2024	2025
Count	733	740
Difference		+0.95%

It has a population of 740 people (31 December 2025).

=== Ethnicity ===
Census 2021 (1+ %)
Ethnicity	Number	Fraction
Hungarian	619	87.06%
Slovak	90	12.65%
Not found out	17	2.39%
Total	711	

In year 2021 was 711 people by ethnicity 619 as Hungarian, 90 as Slovak, 17 as Not found out, 1 as Czech and 1 as Italian.

Note on population: The difference values of population numbers in the table "Population statistic" and in the sections "Ethnicity" & "Religion" is caused by the use of various statistical methods.

=== Religion ===
Census 2021 (1+ %)
Religion	Number	Fraction
Roman Catholic Church	553	77.78%
None	106	14.91%
Calvinist Church	20	2.81%
Not found out	16	2.25%
Evangelical Church	11	1.55%
Total	711	

In year 2021 was 711 people by religion 553 from Roman Catholic Church, 106 from None, 20 from Calvinist Church, 16 from Not found out, 11 from Evangelical Church, 3 from Greek Catholic Church and 2 from Christian Congregations in Slovakia.

At the 2001 Census the recorded population of the village was 736 while an end-2008 estimate by the Statistical Office had the villages's population as 788. As of 2001, 95.65% of its population were Hungarians while 3.80% were Slovaks. Roman Catholicism is the majority religion of the village, its adherents numbering 97.01% of the total population.
