= Hubice =

Hubice Nemesgomba
- Municipality
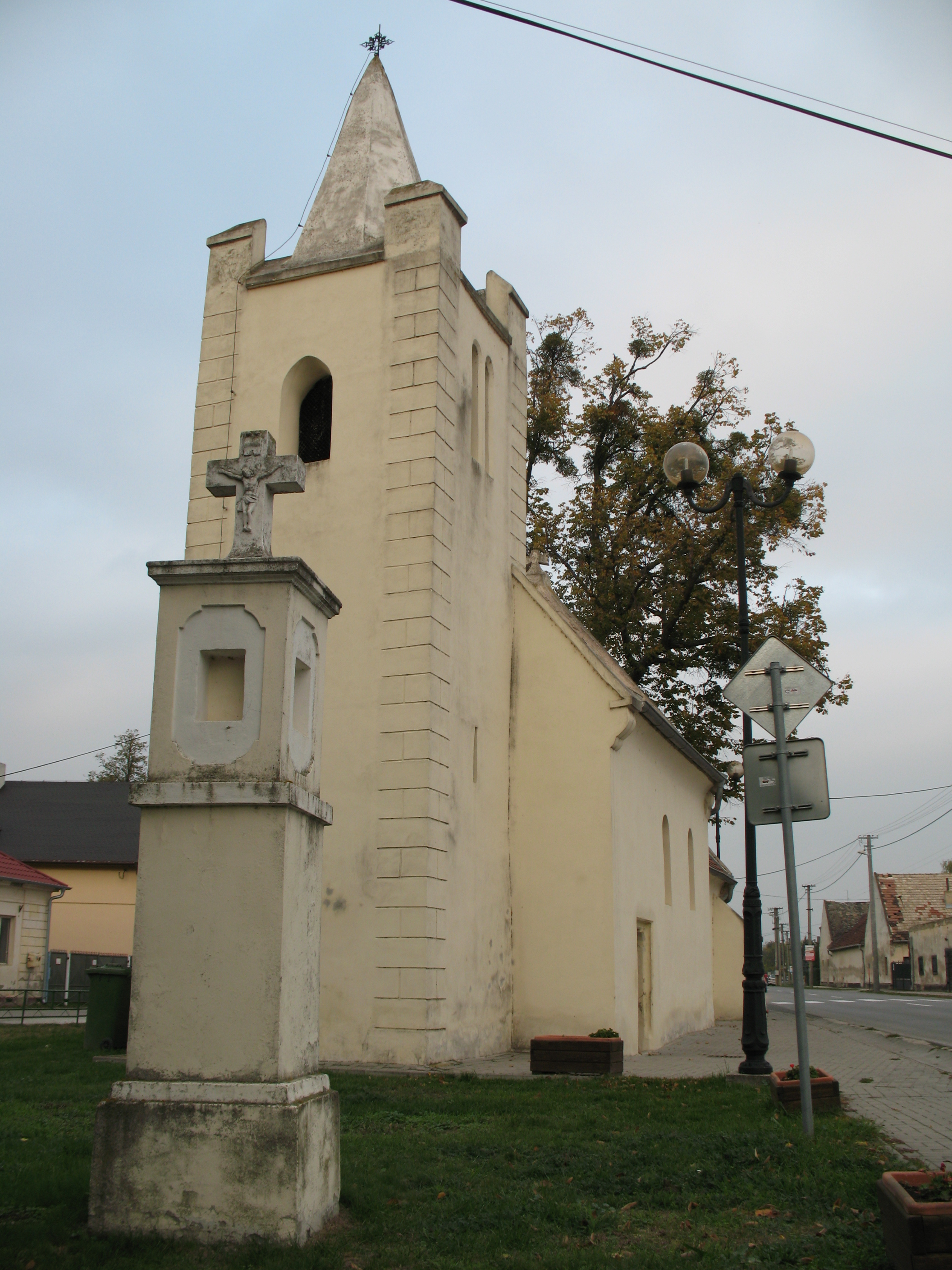

- Flag

- Location of Hubice in the Trnava Region Location of Hubice in Slovakia
- Coordinates: 48.09°N 17.40°E
- Country: Slovakia
- Region: Trnava Region
- District: Dunajská Streda District
- First mentioned: 1293

Government
  - Mayor: Štefan Radics (SMER)

Area
  - Total: 5.35 km^{2} (2.07 sq mi)
- Elevation: 124 m (407 ft)

Population (2025)
  - Total: 691

Ethnicity
  - Hungarians: 77.18 %
  - Slovaks: 22.02 %
- Time zone: UTC+1 (CET)
  - Summer (DST): UTC+2 (CEST)
- Postal code: 930 39
- Area code: +421 31
- Vehicle registration plate (until 2022): DS
- Website: www.hubice.sk

Hubice (Hungarian: Nemesgomba, pronounced [ˈnɛmɛʃɡombɒ]) is a village and municipality in the Dunajská Streda District in the Trnava Region of south-west Slovakia.

== Etymology ==
The name is derived from gǫba (modern Slovak: huba) – a mouth, referring probably to a mouth of the river bay. The same semantic shift exists e.g. in Russian: губа (guba) – a bay.

== History ==
In historical records the village was first mentioned in 1293 (Gumba). Until the end of World War I, it was part of Hungary and fell within the Somorja district of Pozsony County. After the Austro-Hungarian army disintegrated in November 1918, Czechoslovak troops occupied the area. After the Treaty of Trianon of 1920, the village became officially part of Czechoslovakia. In November 1938, the First Vienna Award granted the area to Hungary and it was held by Hungary until 1945. After Soviet occupation in 1945, Czechoslovak administration returned and the village became officially part of Czechoslovakia in 1947.

== Population ==
Population statistic (10 years)
| Year | 1995 | 2005 | 2015 | 2025 |
|---|---|---|---|---|
| Count | 502 | 510 | 595 | 691 |
| Difference | | +1.59% | +16.66% | +16.13% |

Population statistic
| Year | 2024 | 2025 |
|---|---|---|
| Count | 656 | 691 |
| Difference | | +5.33% |

It has a population of 691 people (31 December 2025).

=== Ethnicity ===
Census 2021 (1+ %)
| Ethnicity | Number | Fraction |
|---|---|---|
| Hungarian | 364 | 58.14% |
| Slovak | 279 | 44.56% |
| Not found out | 8 | 1.27% |
| Total | 626 | |

In year 2021 was 626 people by ethnicity 364 as Hungarian, 279 as Slovak, 8 as Not found out, 4 as Czech, 4 as Romani, 4 as Other and 1 as Chinese.

Note on population: The difference values of population numbers in the table "Population statistic" and in the sections "Ethnicity" & "Religion" is caused by the use of various statistical methods.

=== Religion ===
Census 2021 (1+ %)
| Religion | Number | Fraction |
|---|---|---|
| Roman Catholic Church | 419 | 66.93% |
| None | 151 | 24.12% |
| Evangelical Church | 14 | 2.24% |
| Greek Catholic Church | 12 | 1.92% |
| Not found out | 10 | 1.6% |
| Total | 626 | |

In year 2021 was 626 people by religion 419 from Roman Catholic Church, 151 from None, 14 from Evangelical Church, 12 from Greek Catholic Church, 10 from Not found out, 5 from Calvinist Church, 5 from Other and not ascertained christian church, 4 from Baptists Church, 3 from Christian Congregations in Slovakia, 1 from Paganism and natural spirituality, 1 from Other and 1 from Buddhism.

At the 2001 Census the recorded population of the village was 504 while an end-2008 estimate by the Statistical Office had the village's population as 546. As of 2001, 77.18% of its population were Hungarians, while 22.02% were Slovaks. Roman Catholicism is the majority religion of the village, its adherents numbering 92.86% of the total population.

== Geography ==
The municipality lies at an altitude of 124 metres (407 ft) and covers an area of 5.35 km^{2} (2.07 sq mi) (2025).

== See also ==
- List of municipalities and towns in Slovakia

== Genealogical resources ==
The records for genealogical research are available at the state archive "Statny Archiv in Bratislava, Slovakia"

- Roman Catholic church records (births/marriages/deaths): 1673-1898 (parish B)
