= Dobrohošť, Dunajská Streda District =

Dobrohošť Doborgaz
- Municipality
- Flag

- Location of Dobrohošť in the Trnava Region Location of Dobrohošť in Slovakia
- Coordinates: 47°58′56″N 17°21′39″E
- Country: Slovakia
- Region: Trnava Region
- District: Dunajská Streda District
- First mentioned: 1238

Area
  - Total: 4.85 km^{2} (1.87 sq mi)
- Elevation: 122 m (400 ft)

Population (2025)
  - Total: 547

Ethnicity
- Time zone: UTC+1 (CET)
  - Summer (DST): UTC+2 (CEST)
- Postal code: 930 31
- Area code: +421 31
- Vehicle registration plate (until 2022): DS
- Website: dobrohost.sk

Dobrohošť (Hungarian: Doborgaz, pronounced [ˈdoborɡɒz]) is a village and municipality in the Dunajská Streda District in the Trnava Region of south-west Slovakia.

== History ==
In historical records the village was first mentioned in 1238, when it was the part of the Kingdom of Hungary. After the Austro-Hungarian army disintegrated in November 1918, Czechoslovak troops occupied the area, later acknowledged internationally by the Treaty of Trianon. Between 1938 and 1945 Dobrohošť once more became part of Miklós Horthy's Hungary through the First Vienna Award. From 1945 until the Velvet Divorce, it was part of Czechoslovakia. Since then it has been part of Slovakia.

== Geography ==
The municipality lies at an altitude of 122 metres (400 ft) and covers an area of 4.85 km^{2} (1.87 sq mi) (2025).

== See also ==
- List of municipalities and towns in Slovakia

== Population ==
Population statistic (10 years)
Year	1995	2005	2015	2025
Count	370	375	463	547
Difference		+1.35%	+23.46%	+18.14%

Population statistic
Year	2024	2025
Count	529	547
Difference		+3.40%

It has a population of 547 people (31 December 2025).

=== Ethnicity ===
Census 2021 (1+ %)
Ethnicity	Number	Fraction
Hungarian	265	51.25%
Slovak	243	47%
Not found out	19	3.67%
Total	517	

In year 2021 was 517 people by ethnicity 265 as Hungarian, 243 as Slovak, 19 as Not found out, 4 as Czech, 3 as Romanian, 2 as Other, 1 as Ukrainian, 1 as Serbian, 1 as Romani, 1 as Rusyn and 1 as Russian.

Note on population: The difference values of population numbers in the table "Population statistic" and in the sections "Ethnicity" & "Religion" is caused by the use of various statistical methods.

=== Religion ===
Census 2021 (1+ %)
Religion	Number	Fraction
Roman Catholic Church	286	55.32%
None	174	33.66%
Not found out	33	6.38%
Evangelical Church	8	1.55%
Total	517	

In year 2021 was 517 people by religion 286 from Roman Catholic Church, 174 from None, 33 from Not found out, 8 from Evangelical Church, 3 from Calvinist Church, 2 from Eastern Orthodox Church, 2 from Other and not ascertained christian church, 2 from Greek Catholic Church, 2 from United Methodist Church, 1 from Islam, 1 from Other, 1 from Church of the Brethren, 1 from Buddhism and 1 from Ad hoc movements.

== Genealogical resources ==
The records for genealogical research are available at the state archive "Štátny Archív in Bratislava, Slovakia"

- Roman Catholic church records (births/marriages/deaths): 1673-1906 (parish B)
- Lutheran church records (births/marriages/deaths): 1706-1895 (parish B)
