= Janíky =

Janíky Jányok
- Municipality
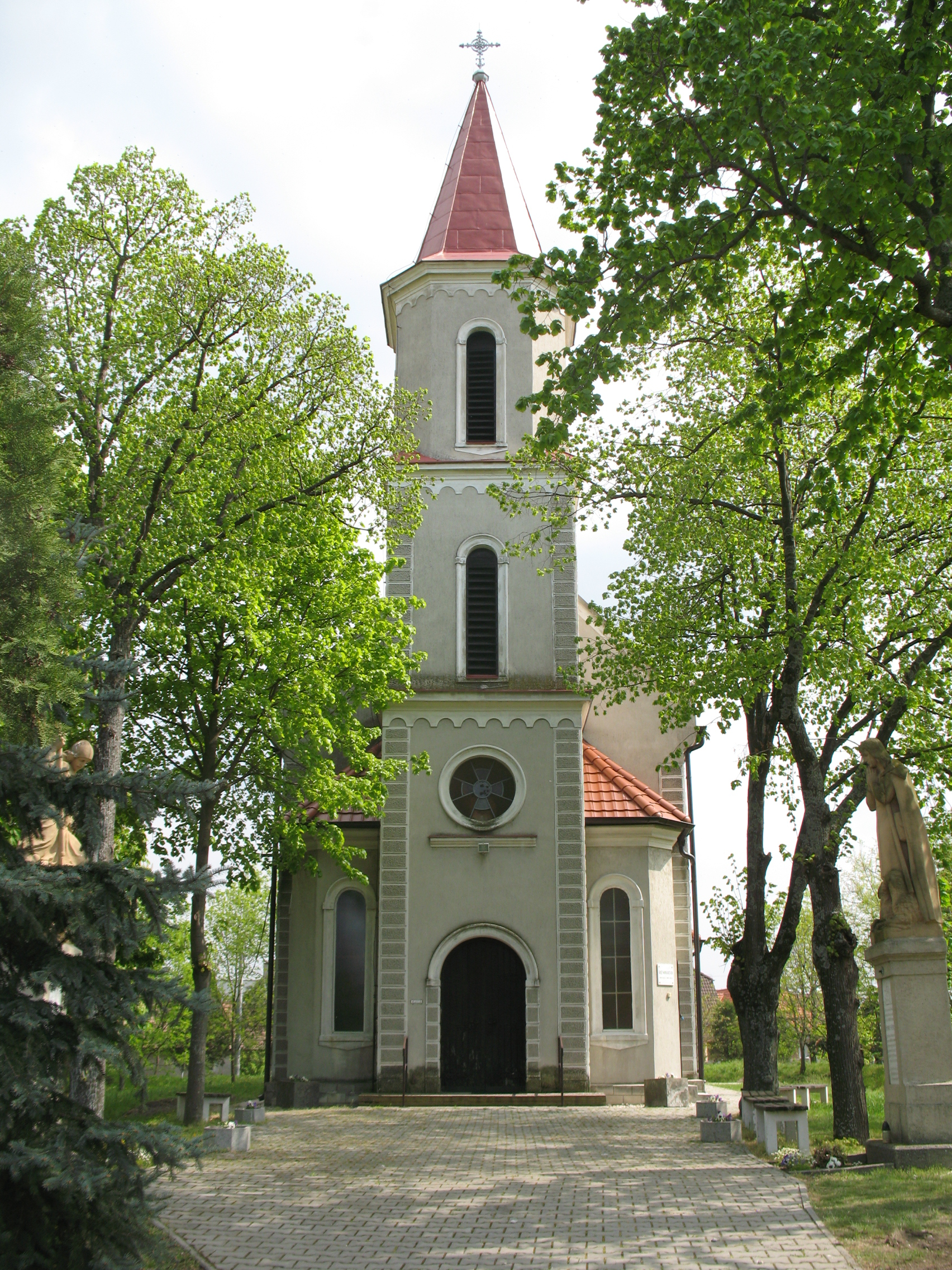

- Flag

- Location of Janíky in the Trnava Region Location of Janíky in Slovakia
- Coordinates: 48.14°N 17.39°E
- Country: Slovakia
- Region: Trnava Region
- District: Dunajská Streda District
- First mentioned: 1287

Government
  - Mayor: Lajos Berner (Most-Híd)

Area
  - Total: 13.23 km^{2} (5.11 sq mi)
- Elevation: 125 m (410 ft)

Population (2025)
  - Total: 974

Ethnicity
  - Hungarians: 90.28 %
  - Slovaks: 9.08 %
- Time zone: UTC+1 (CET)
  - Summer (DST): UTC+2 (CEST)
- Postal code: 930 39
- Area code: +421 31
- Vehicle registration plate (until 2022): DS
- Website: www.janiky.sk

Janíky (Hungarian: Jányok, pronounced [ˈjaːɲok]) is a village and municipality in the Dunajská Streda District in the Trnava Region of south-west Slovakia.

== Geography ==
The municipality lies at an altitude of 125 metres (410 ft) and covers an area of 13.23 km^{2} (5.11 sq mi) (2025).

== History ==
In the 9th century, the territory of Janiky became part of the Kingdom of Hungary. In historical records the name of the village was first mentioned in 1287 in the Hungarian form Janok. The Slovak form was first recorded in 1311 as Janyk. In 1940, three villages Alsójányok, Felsőjányok and Bústelek were unified creating the present-day municipality.

Until the end of World War I, it was part of Hungary and fell within the Somorja district of Pozsony County. After the Austro-Hungarian army disintegrated in November 1918, Czechoslovak troops occupied the area. After the Treaty of Trianon of 1920, the village became officially part of Czechoslovakia. In November 1938, the First Vienna Award granted the area to Hungary and it was held by Hungary until 1945. After Soviet occupation in 1945, Czechoslovak administration returned and the village became officially part of Czechoslovakia in 1947.

== Population ==
Population statistic (10 years)
Year	1995	2005	2015	2025
Count	805	786	905	974
Difference		−2.36%	+15.13%	+7.62%

Population statistic
Year	2024	2025
Count	957	974
Difference		+1.77%

It has a population of 974 people (31 December 2025).

=== Ethnicity ===
Census 2021 (1+ %)
Ethnicity	Number	Fraction
Hungarian	650	71.03%
Slovak	280	30.6%
Not found out	32	3.49%
Total	915	

In year 2021 was 915 people by ethnicity 650 as Hungarian, 280 as Slovak, 32 as Not found out, 5 as Other, 2 as Czech, 2 as Italian, 1 as Ukrainian, 1 as Serbian, 1 as Romani and 1 as German.

Note on population: The difference values of population numbers in the table "Population statistic" and in the sections "Ethnicity" & "Religion" is caused by the use of various statistical methods.

=== Religion ===
Census 2021 (1+ %)
Religion	Number	Fraction
Roman Catholic Church	753	82.3%
None	101	11.04%
Not found out	28	3.06%
Evangelical Church	11	1.2%
Total	915	

In year 2021 was 915 people by religion 753 from Roman Catholic Church, 101 from None, 28 from Not found out, 11 from Evangelical Church, 9 from Greek Catholic Church, 4 from Calvinist Church, 3 from Other, 1 from New Apostolic Church, 1 from Christian Congregations in Slovakia, 1 from United Methodist Church, 1 from Czechoslovak Hussite Church, 1 from Buddhism and 1 from Baptists Church.

== See also ==
- List of municipalities and towns in Slovakia

== Genealogical resources ==
The records for genealogical research are available at the state archive "Statny Archiv in Bratislava, Slovakia"

- Roman Catholic church records (births/marriages/deaths): 1673-1897 (parish B)
- Lutheran church records (births/marriages/deaths): 1706-1895 (parish B)
