= Čakany =

Čakany Pozsonycsákány
- Municipality
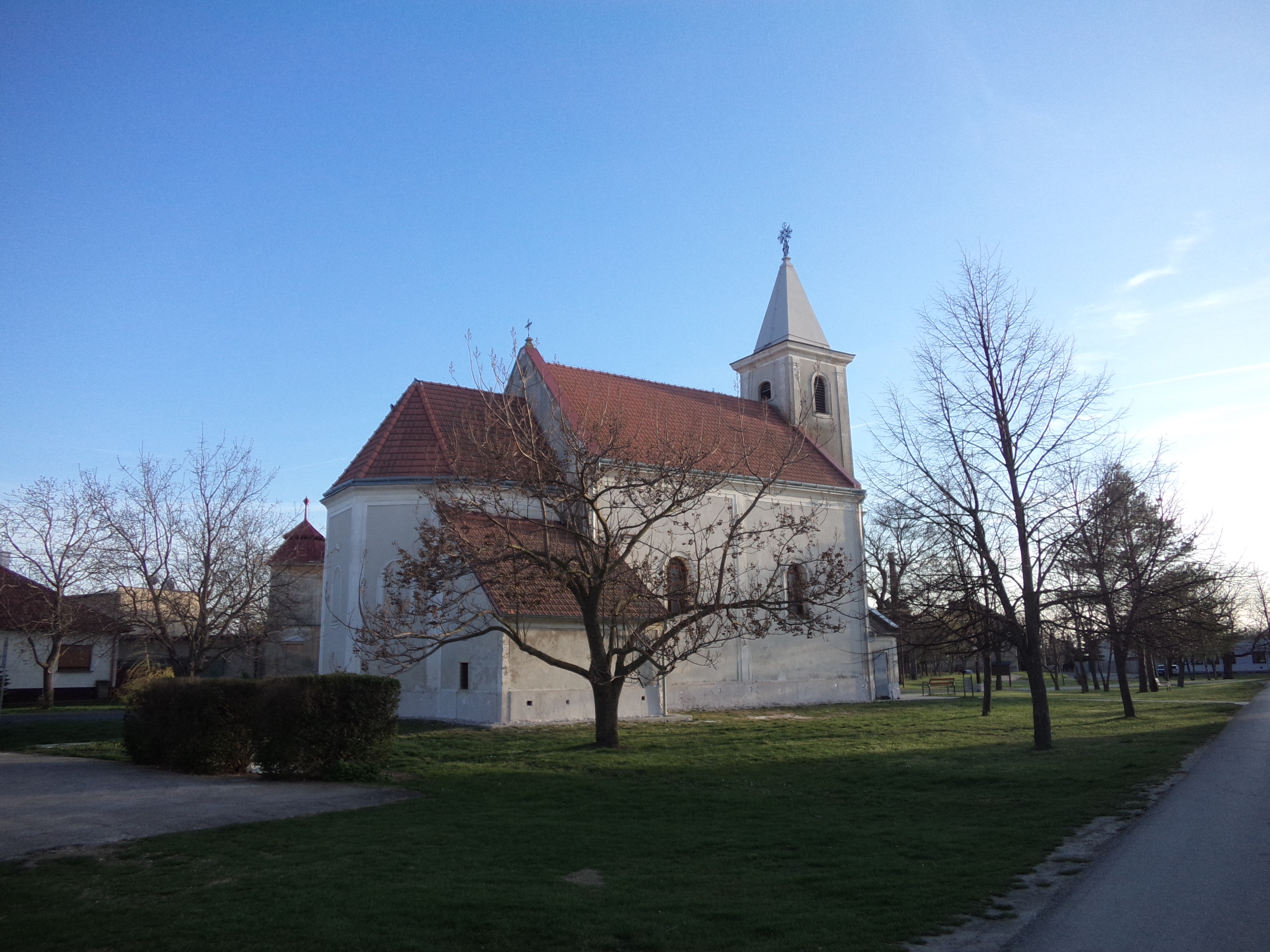

- Flag

- Location of Čakany in the Trnava Region Location of Čakany in Slovakia
- Coordinates: 48.12°N 17.36°E
- Country: Slovakia
- Region: Trnava Region
- District: Dunajská Streda District
- First mentioned: 1254

Government
  - Mayor: Lívia Bugár

Area
  - Total: 11.18 km^{2} (4.32 sq mi)
- Elevation: 125 m (410 ft)

Population (2025)
  - Total: 640

Ethnicity
  - Hungarians: 86,27%
  - Slovaks: 10,70%
- Time zone: UTC+1 (CET)
  - Summer (DST): UTC+2 (CEST)
- Postal code: 930 40
- Area code: +421 31
- Vehicle registration plate (until 2022): DS
- Website: www.cakany.sk

Čakany (Hungarian: Pozsonycsákány, lit. 'Pressburg pickaxe', pronounced [ˈpoʒoɲtʃaːkaːɲ]; German: Knitteldorf) is a village and municipality in the Dunajská Streda District in the Trnava Region of south-west Slovakia.

== Geography ==
The municipality lies at an altitude of 125 metres (410 ft) and covers an area of 11.18 km^{2} (4.32 sq mi) (2025).

== History ==
In the 11th century, the territory of Čakany became part of the Kingdom of Hungary. After the Austro-Hungarian army disintegrated in November 1918, Czechoslovak troops occupied the area, later acknowledged internationally by the Treaty of Trianon. Between 1938 and 1945 Čakany once more became part of Miklós Horthy's Hungary through the First Vienna Award. From 1945 until the Velvet Divorce, it was part of Czechoslovakia. Since then it has been part of Slovakia.

== Population ==
Population statistic (10 years)
Year	1995	2005	2015	2025
Count	522	574	629	640
Difference		+9.96%	+9.58%	+1.74%

Population statistic
Year	2024	2025
Count	621	640
Difference		+3.05%

It has a population of 640 people (31 December 2025).

=== Ethnicity ===
Census 2021 (1+ %)
Ethnicity	Number	Fraction
Hungarian	402	61.75%
Slovak	253	38.86%
Not found out	21	3.22%
Total	651	

In year 2021 was 651 people by ethnicity 402 as Hungarian, 253 as Slovak, 21 as Not found out, 6 as Czech, 2 as Bulgarian, 1 as Romani, 1 as Romanian and 1 as Polish.

Note on population: The difference values of population numbers in the table "Population statistic" and in the sections "Ethnicity" & "Religion" is caused by the use of various statistical methods.

=== Religion ===
Census 2021 (1+ %)
Religion	Number	Fraction
Roman Catholic Church	491	75.42%
None	107	16.44%
Not found out	20	3.07%
Total	651	

In year 2021 was 651 people by religion 491 from Roman Catholic Church, 107 from None, 20 from Not found out, 6 from Calvinist Church, 6 from Greek Catholic Church, 4 from Evangelical Church, 4 from Buddhism, 3 from Eastern Orthodox Church, 3 from Other and not ascertained christian church, 3 from Christian Congregations in Slovakia, 2 from Ad hoc movements, 1 from Jewish community and 1 from Jehovah's Witnesses.

== See also ==
- List of municipalities and towns in Slovakia

== Genealogical resources ==
The records for genealogical research are available at the state archive "Statny Archiv in Bratislava, Slovakia"

- Roman Catholic church records (births/marriages/deaths): 1729-1925 (parish B))
- Lutheran church records (births/marriages/deaths): 1880-1895 (parish B)
