= Malé Dvorníky =

Malé Dvorníky Kisudvarnok
- Municipality
- Flag

- Location of Malé Dvorníky in the Trnava Region Location of Malé Dvorníky in Slovakia
- Coordinates: 48.01°N 17.64°E
- Country: Slovakia
- Region: Trnava Region
- District: Dunajská Streda District
- First mentioned: 1336

Government
  - Mayor: Dávid Kaščák (Independent)

Area
  - Total: 6.88 km^{2} (2.66 sq mi)
- Elevation: 115 m (377 ft)

Population (2025)
  - Total: 1,193

Ethnicity
  - Hungarians: 92,51 %
  - Slovaks: 7,16 %
- Time zone: UTC+1 (CET)
  - Summer (DST): UTC+2 (CEST)
- Postal code: 929 01
- Area code: +421 31
- Vehicle registration plate (until 2022): DS
- Website: maledvorniky.sk

Malé Dvorníky (Hungarian: Kisudvarnok, pronounced [ˈkiʃudvɒrnok]) is a village and municipality in the Dunajská Streda District in the Trnava Region of south-west Slovakia.

== Geography ==
The municipality lies at an altitude of 115 metres (377 ft) and covers an area of 6.88 km^{2} (2.66 sq mi) (2025).

== History ==
In the 9th century, the territory of Malé Dvorníky became part of the Kingdom of Hungary. It was an Avar settlement in the 6th century. The name of the village was first recorded in 1254 as "Odour". Until the end of World War I, it was part of Hungary and fell within the Dunaszerdahely district of Pozsony County. After the Austro-Hungarian army disintegrated in November 1918, Czechoslovak troops occupied the area. After the Treaty of Trianon of 1920, the village became officially part of Czechoslovakia. In November 1938, the First Vienna Award granted the area to Hungary and it was held by Hungary until 1945. After Soviet occupation in 1945, Czechoslovak administration returned and the village became officially part of Czechoslovakia in 1947. In 1946, a great number of local Hungarian families were deported to the Czech lands, but most of them were able to return later.

== Population ==
Population statistic (10 years)
Year	1995	2005	2015	2025
Count	815	957	1114	1193
Difference		+17.42%	+16.40%	+7.09%

Population statistic
Year	2024	2025
Count	1197	1193
Difference		−0.33%

It has a population of 1193 people (31 December 2025).

In 1910, the village had 445, for the most part, Hungarian inhabitants.

=== Ethnicity ===
Census 2021 (1+ %)
Ethnicity	Number	Fraction
Hungarian	1026	86.8%
Slovak	174	14.72%
Not found out	33	2.79%
Total	1182	

In year 2021 was 1182 people by ethnicity 1026 as Hungarian, 174 as Slovak, 33 as Not found out, 4 as Czech, 4 as German, 2 as Other, 1 as Irish, 1 as Romani, 1 as Romanian and 1 as Austrian.

Note on population: The difference values of population numbers in the table "Population statistic" and in the sections "Ethnicity" & "Religion" is caused by the use of various statistical methods.

=== Religion ===
Census 2021 (1+ %)
Religion	Number	Fraction
Roman Catholic Church	846	71.57%
None	212	17.94%
Calvinist Church	70	5.92%
Not found out	22	1.86%
Total	1182	

In year 2021 was 1182 people by religion 846 from Roman Catholic Church, 212 from None, 70 from Calvinist Church, 22 from Not found out, 10 from Greek Catholic Church, 9 from Evangelical Church, 4 from Christian Congregations in Slovakia, 4 from Ad hoc movements, 2 from Other and not ascertained christian church, 2 from Other and 1 from Buddhism.
