= Horný Bar =

Horný Bar Felbár
- Municipality
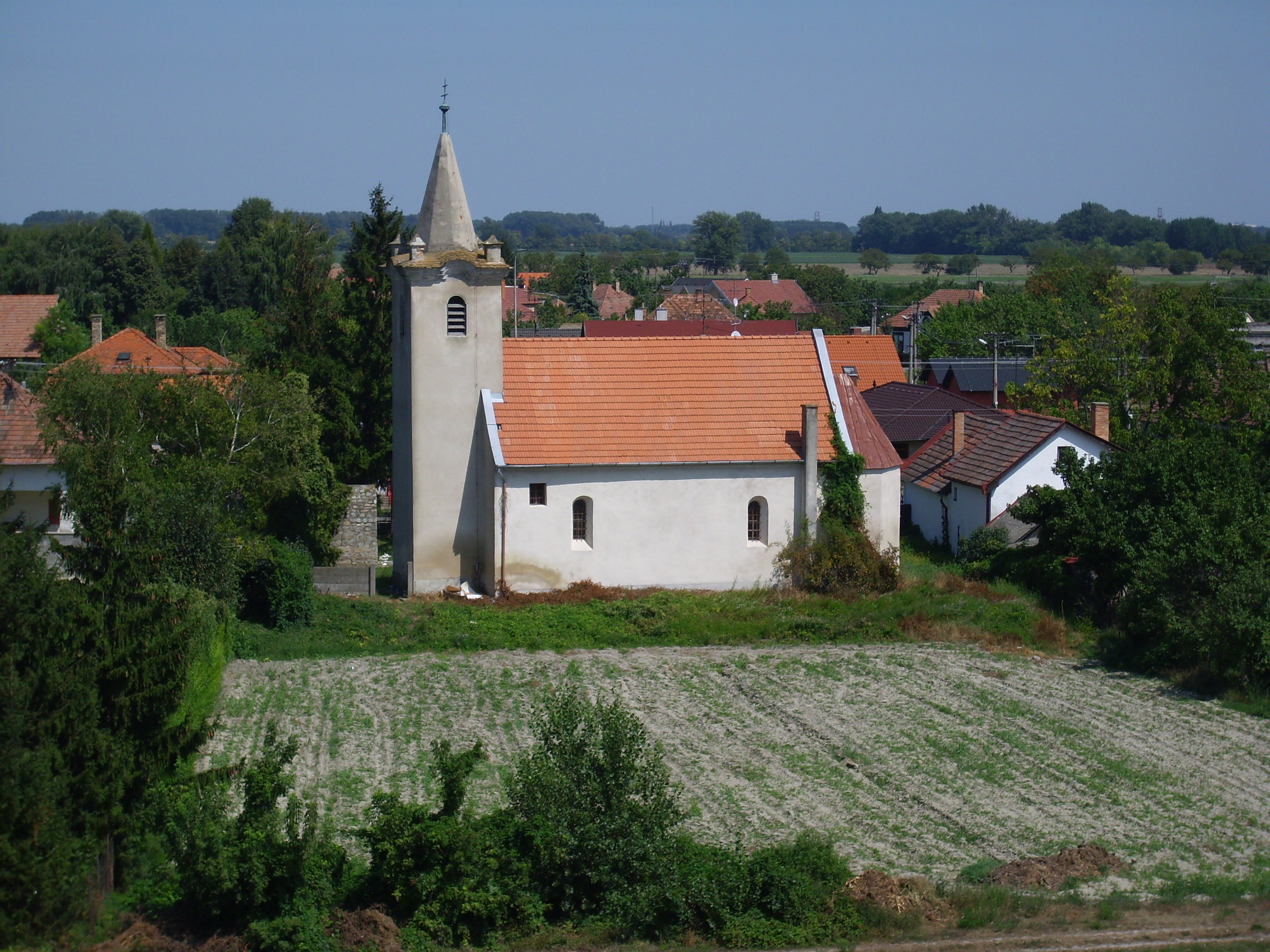

- Flag Coat of arms

- Location of Horný Bar in the Trnava Region Location of Horný Bar in Slovakia
- Coordinates: 47.95°N 17.46°E
- Country: Slovakia
- Region: Trnava Region
- District: Dunajská Streda District
- First mentioned: 1245

Government
  - Mayor: István Bodó

Area
  - Total: 11.77 km^{2} (4.54 sq mi)
- Elevation: 120 m (390 ft)

Population (2025)
  - Total: 1,311

Ethnicity
  - Hungarians: 89,21%
  - Slovaks: 9,77%
- Time zone: UTC+1 (CET)
  - Summer (DST): UTC+2 (CEST)
- Postal code: 930 33
- Area code: +421 31
- Vehicle registration plate (until 2022): DS
- Website: www.hornybar.sk

Horný Bar (Hungarian: Felbár, pronounced [ˈfɛlbaːr]) is a village and municipality in the Dunajská Streda District in the Trnava Region of south-west Slovakia.

== Geography ==
The municipality lies at an altitude of 120 metres (390 ft) and covers an area of 11.77 km^{2} (4.54 sq mi) (2025).

== History ==
In the 9th century, the territory of Horný Bar became part of the Kingdom of Hungary. In historical records the village was first mentioned in 1245. Until the end of World War I, it was part of Hungary and fell within the Dunaszerdahely district of Pozsony County. After the Austro-Hungarian army disintegrated in November 1918, Czechoslovak troops occupied the area. Under the Treaty of Trianon of 1920, it became officially part of Czechoslovakia and fell within Bratislava County until 1927. In November 1938, the First Vienna Award granted the area to Hungary and it was held by Hungary until 1945. After Soviet occupation in 1945, Czechoslovak administration returned and the village became officially part of Czechoslovakia by the Paris Peace Treaties in 1947.

== Population ==
Population statistic (10 years)
Year	1995	2005	2015	2025
Count	1048	1233	1251	1311
Difference		+17.65%	+1.45%	+4.79%

Population statistic
Year	2024	2025
Count	1313	1311
Difference		−0.15%

It has a population of 1311 people (31 December 2025).

=== Ethnicity ===
Census 2021 (1+ %)
Ethnicity	Number	Fraction
Hungarian	947	76.12%
Slovak	315	25.32%
Not found out	32	2.57%
Total	1244	

In year 2021 was 1244 people by ethnicity 947 as Hungarian, 315 as Slovak, 32 as Not found out, 12 as Czech, 6 as Romani, 3 as Other and 2 as Russian.

Note on population: The difference values of population numbers in the table "Population statistic" and in the sections "Ethnicity" & "Religion" is caused by the use of various statistical methods.

=== Religion ===
Census 2021 (1+ %)
Religion	Number	Fraction
Roman Catholic Church	971	78.05%
None	192	15.43%
Calvinist Church	25	2.01%
Not found out	18	1.45%
Total	1244	

In year 2021 was 1244 people by religion 971 from Roman Catholic Church, 192 from None, 25 from Calvinist Church, 18 from Not found out, 11 from Christian Congregations in Slovakia, 9 from Evangelical Church, 7 from Other, 3 from Greek Catholic Church, 2 from Apostolic Church, 1 from Other and not ascertained christian church, 1 from Jehovah's Witnesses, 1 from United Methodist Church, 1 from Church of Jesus Christ of Latter-day Saints, 1 from Buddhism and 1 from Ad hoc movements.

At the 2001 Census the recorded population of the village was 1,075 while an end-2008 estimate by the Institute of Informatics and Statistics had the villages's population as 1,253. At the 2001 census, 89.21% of its residents reported themselves as Hungarian and 9.77% as Slovak. It's reported Roman Catholicism being professed by 94.98% of the total population.

== Notable people ==
- László Batthyány-Strattmann was born here in 1870

== See also ==
- List of municipalities and towns in Slovakia

== Genealogical resources ==
The records for genealogical research are available at the state archive "Statny Archiv in Bratislava, Slovakia"

- Roman Catholic church records (births/marriages/deaths): 1676-1912 (parish A)
- Lutheran church records (births/marriages/deaths): 1823-1946 (parish B)
