= Kostolné Kračany =

Kostolné Kračany Egyházkarcsa
- Municipality
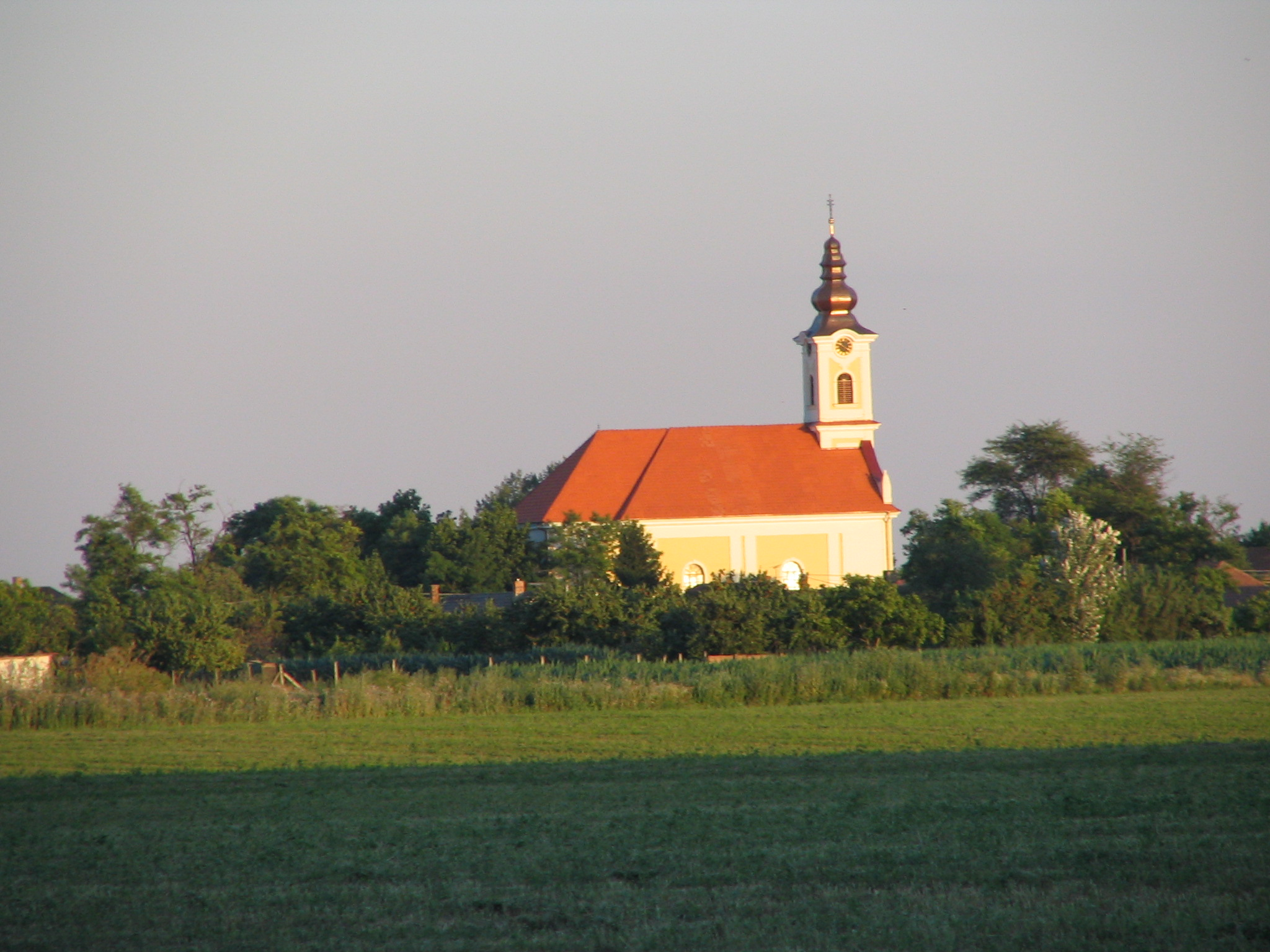

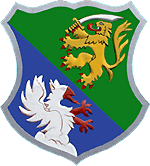
- Flag Coat of arms

- Location of Kostolné Kračany in the Trnava Region Location of Kostolné Kračany in Slovakia
- Coordinates: 47.98°N 17.58°E
- Country: Slovakia
- Region: Trnava Region
- District: Dunajská Streda District
- First mentioned: 1215

Government
  - Mayor: László Gódány (Most-Híd, Party of the Hungarian Coalition)

Area
  - Total: 13.91 km^{2} (5.37 sq mi)
- Elevation: 116 m (381 ft)

Population (2025)
  - Total: 1,519

Ethnicity
  - Hungarians: 92.77%
  - Slovaks: 5.51%
- Time zone: UTC+1 (CET)
  - Summer (DST): UTC+2 (CEST)
- Postal code: 930 03
- Area code: +421 31
- Vehicle registration plate (until 2022): DS
- Website: www.kostolnekracany.sk

Kostolné Kračany (Hungarian: Egyházkarcsa, pronounced [ˈɛɟhaːzkɒrtʃɒ]) is a village and municipality in the Dunajská Streda District in the Trnava Region of south-west Slovakia.

== Component villages ==
The village also administers 5 other villages:

| In Slovak | In Hungarian |
|---|---|
| Amadeho Kračany | Amadékarcsa |
| Kynceľove Kračany | Göncölkarcsa |
| Moravské Kračany | Mórockarcsa |
| Pinkove Kračany | Pinkekarcsa |
| Šipošovske Kračany | Siposkarcsa |

== Geography ==
The municipality lies at an altitude of 116 metres (381 ft) and covers an area of 13.91 km^{2} (5.37 sq mi) (2025).

== History ==
In the 11th century, the territory of Kostolné Kračany became part of the Kingdom of Hungary. In historical records the village was first mentioned in 1215 as Corcha. Its first church was consecrated to Saint Bartholomew before 1249. However, the settlement is considered to originate from the era of the Hungarian conquest of the Carpathian Basin as the structure of the village reflects the ecclesiastical system as organised by King St Stephen of Hungary. The king ordered that all 10 villages must build a church, the villages named Karcha build the church in this village whose name in Hungarian means Church Karcha.

In the 14th century, it consisted of the following villages: Egyházaskarcha (1351), Remegkarcha (1355), Diákkarcha (1357), Barthalkarcha (1377) Lászlókarcha (1377) és Lucakarcha (1467). In 1561, the people of the village converted to the Protestant Reformed church, and only in 1729 was the Catholic congregation re-established. During the 16th and 17th centuries, the village was under the patronage of the Somogyi family. The population, 62 in 1840, grew to 80 by 1910. Ethnically, the population was predominantly Hungarian. Until the Treaty of Trianon, it was part of Pozsony county.

== Population ==
Population statistic (10 years)
| Year | 1995 | 2005 | 2015 | 2025 |
|---|---|---|---|---|
| Count | 1093 | 1211 | 1320 | 1519 |
| Difference | | +10.79% | +9.00% | +15.07% |

Population statistic
| Year | 2024 | 2025 |
|---|---|---|
| Count | 1494 | 1519 |
| Difference | | +1.67% |

It has a population of 1519 people (31 December 2025).

=== Ethnicity ===
Census 2021 (1+ %)
| Ethnicity | Number | Fraction |
|---|---|---|
| Hungarian | 1261 | 88.86% |
| Slovak | 172 | 12.12% |
| Not found out | 38 | 2.67% |
| Total | 1419 | |

In year 2021 was 1419 people by ethnicity 1261 as Hungarian, 172 as Slovak, 38 as Not found out, 6 as Czech, 4 as Rusyn, 3 as Romanian, 1 as Ukrainian, 1 as German, 1 as Other and 1 as Bulgarian.

Note on population: The difference values of population numbers in the table "Population statistic" and in the sections "Ethnicity" & "Religion" is caused by the use of various statistical methods.

=== Religion ===
Census 2021 (1+ %)
| Religion | Number | Fraction |
|---|---|---|
| Roman Catholic Church | 1115 | 78.58% |
| None | 210 | 14.8% |
| Calvinist Church | 37 | 2.61% |
| Evangelical Church | 16 | 1.13% |
| Not found out | 15 | 1.06% |
| Total | 1419 | |

In year 2021 was 1419 people by religion 1115 from Roman Catholic Church, 210 from None, 37 from Calvinist Church, 16 from Evangelical Church, 15 from Not found out, 14 from Greek Catholic Church, 6 from Other and not ascertained christian church, 2 from Christian Congregations in Slovakia, 2 from Other, 1 from Jewish community and 1 from Paganism and natural spirituality.

According to the 2001 census, its total population was 1162, including 1078 ethnic Hungarians (92,77%) and 64 ethnic Slovaks (5,51%). As of December 31, 2008 the estimated resident population was 1293.

== See also ==
- List of municipalities and towns in Slovakia

== Genealogical resources ==
The records for genealogical research are available at the state archive "Statny Archiv in Bratislava, Slovakia"

- Roman Catholic church records (births/marriages/deaths): 1673-1935 (parish A)
