= Veľké Dvorníky =

Veľké Dvorníky Nagyudvarnok
- Municipality
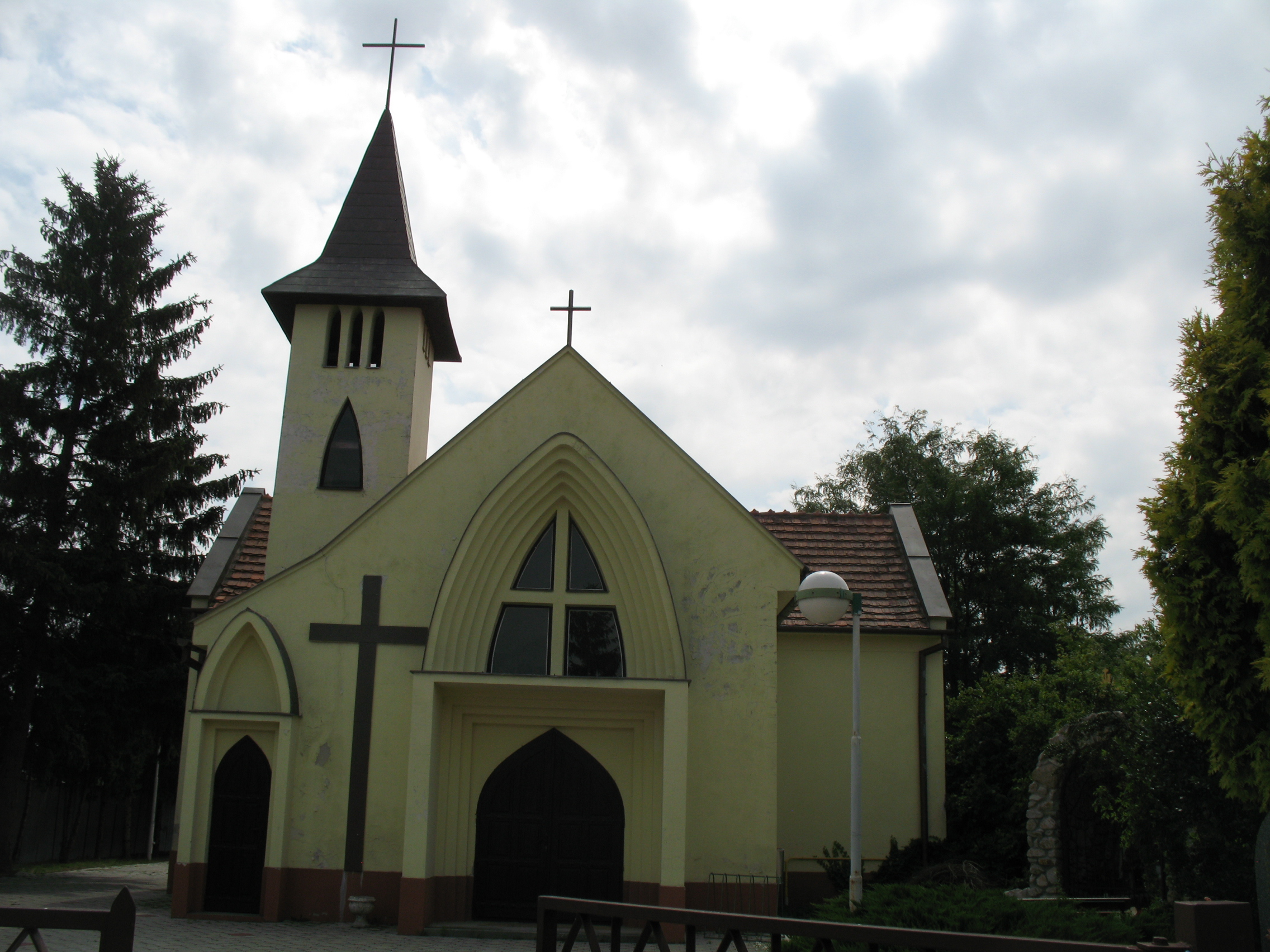

- Flag

- Location of Veľké Dvorníky in the Trnava Region Location of Veľké Dvorníky in Slovakia
- Coordinates: 48.00°N 17.65°E
- Country: Slovakia
- Region: Trnava Region
- District: Dunajská Streda District
- First mentioned: 1252

Government
  - Mayor: Ernest Tóth (Party of the Hungarian Coalition)

Area
  - Total: 7.99 km^{2} (3.08 sq mi)
- Elevation: 114 m (374 ft)

Population (2025)
  - Total: 1,368

Ethnicity
  - Hungarians: 95,85 %
  - Slovaks: 3,14%
- Time zone: UTC+1 (CET)
  - Summer (DST): UTC+2 (CEST)
- Postal code: 929 01
- Area code: +421 31
- Vehicle registration plate (until 2022): DS
- Website: www.velkedvorniky.sk

Veľké Dvorníky (Hungarian: Nagyudvarnok, pronounced [ˈnɒɟudvrnok]) is a village and municipality in the Dunajská Streda District in the Trnava Region of south-west Slovakia. Its former Slovak name is Dvorníky na Ostrove.

== Geography ==
The municipality lies at an altitude of 114 metres (374 ft) and covers an area of 7.99 km^{2} (3.08 sq mi) (2025).

== History ==
In the 9th century, the territory of Veľké Dvorníky became part of the Kingdom of Hungary. The village was first recorded in 1162 as village inhabited by people with Udvarnok social status which meant half-free people in the service of the kings of Hungary and Pozsony Castle. Until the end of World War I, it was part of Hungary and fell within the Dunaszerdahely district of Pozsony County. After the Austro-Hungarian army disintegrated in November 1918, Czechoslovak troops occupied the area. After the Treaty of Trianon of 1920, the village became officially part of Czechoslovakia. In November 1938, the First Vienna Award granted the area to Hungary and it was held by Hungary until 1945. The present-day municipality was formed in 1940 by unifying the three component villages. After Soviet occupation in 1945, Czechoslovak administration returned and the village became officially part of Czechoslovakia in 1947.

== Population ==
Population statistic (10 years)
Year	1995	2005	2015	2025
Count	720	899	1139	1368
Difference		+24.86%	+26.69%	+20.10%

Population statistic
Year	2024	2025
Count	1373	1368
Difference		−0.36%

It has a population of 1368 people (31 December 2025).

In 1910, the village had 389, for the most part, Hungarian inhabitants.

=== Ethnicity ===
Census 2021 (1+ %)
Ethnicity	Number	Fraction
Hungarian	1117	81.29%
Slovak	211	15.35%
Not found out	139	10.11%
Romani	21	1.52%
Total	1374	

In year 2021 was 1374 people by ethnicity 1117 as Hungarian, 211 as Slovak, 139 as Not found out, 21 as Romani, 8 as Czech, 4 as Other, 1 as German and 1 as Albanian.

Note on population: The difference values of population numbers in the table "Population statistic" and in the sections "Ethnicity" & "Religion" is caused by the use of various statistical methods.

=== Religion ===
Census 2021 (1+ %)
Religion	Number	Fraction
Roman Catholic Church	892	64.92%
None	259	18.85%
Not found out	133	9.68%
Calvinist Church	46	3.35%
Evangelical Church	16	1.16%
Total	1374	

In year 2021 was 1374 people by religion 892 from Roman Catholic Church, 259 from None, 133 from Not found out, 46 from Calvinist Church, 16 from Evangelical Church, 11 from Greek Catholic Church, 7 from Christian Congregations in Slovakia, 4 from Other and not ascertained christian church, 3 from Ad hoc movements, 1 from Jewish community, 1 from Old Catholic Church and 1 from Buddhism.
