= Dolný Bar =

Dolný Bar Albár
- Municipality
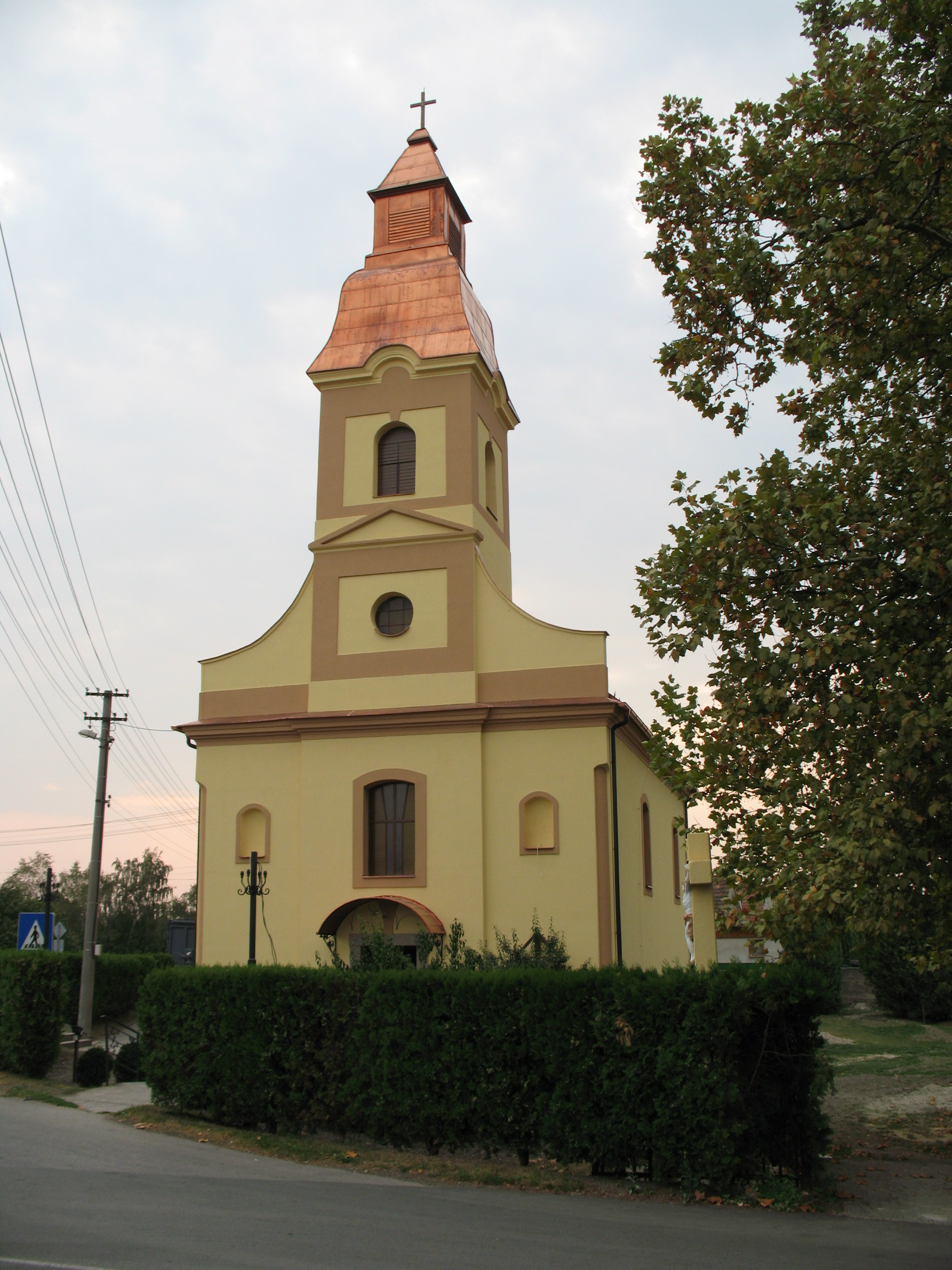
- Church of Saint Anne

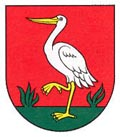
- Flag Coat of arms

- Location of Dolný Bar in the Trnava Region Location of Dolný Bar in Slovakia
- Coordinates: 47.97°N 17.69°E
- Country: Slovakia
- Region: Trnava Region
- District: Dunajská Streda District
- First mentioned: 1245

Government
  - Mayor: Oszkár Bereczk (Party of the Hungarian Coalition, Most-Híd)

Area
  - Total: 8.19 km^{2} (3.16 sq mi)
- Elevation: 114 m (374 ft)

Population (2025)
  - Total: 1,022

Ethnicity
  - Hungarians: 82.63%
  - Slovaks: 14.48%
- Time zone: UTC+1 (CET)
  - Summer (DST): UTC+2 (CEST)
- Postal code: 930 14
- Area code: +421 31
- Vehicle registration plate (until 2022): DS
- Website: www.dolnybar.sk

Dolný Bar (Hungarian: Albár, pronounced [ˈɒlbaːr]) is a village and municipality in the Dunajská Streda District in the Trnava Region of south-west Slovakia.

== Geography ==
The municipality lies at an altitude of 114 metres (374 ft) and covers an area of 8.19 km^{2} (3.16 sq mi) (2025).

== History ==
In the 9th century, the territory of Dolný Bar became part of the Kingdom of Hungary. In historical records the village was first mentioned in 1245. After the Austro-Hungarian army disintegrated in November 1918, Czechoslovak troops occupied the area, later acknowledged internationally by the Treaty of Trianon. Between 1938 and 1945 Dolný Bar once more became part of Miklós Horthy's Hungary through the First Vienna Award. From 1945 until the Velvet Divorce, it was part of Czechoslovakia. Since then it has been part of Slovakia.

== Population ==
Population statistic (10 years)
Year	1995	2005	2015	2025
Count	481	583	607	1022
Difference		+21.20%	+4.11%	+68.36%

Population statistic
Year	2024	2025
Count	1023	1022
Difference		−0.09%

It has a population of 1022 people (31 December 2025).

=== Ethnicity ===
Census 2021 (1+ %)
Ethnicity	Number	Fraction
Hungarian	629	76.8%
Slovak	227	27.71%
Not found out	20	2.44%
Czech	10	1.22%
Total	819	

In year 2021 was 819 people by ethnicity 629 as Hungarian, 227 as Slovak, 20 as Not found out, 10 as Czech, 2 as Ukrainian, 1 as Serbian, 1 as Rusyn, 1 as Austrian and 1 as German.

Note on population: The difference values of population numbers in the table "Population statistic" and in the sections "Ethnicity" & "Religion" is caused by the use of various statistical methods.

=== Religion ===
Census 2021 (1+ %)
Religion	Number	Fraction
Roman Catholic Church	541	66.06%
None	180	21.98%
Calvinist Church	48	5.86%
Evangelical Church	18	2.2%
Not found out	13	1.59%
Total	819	

In year 2021 was 819 people by religion 541 from Roman Catholic Church, 180 from None, 48 from Calvinist Church, 18 from Evangelical Church, 13 from Not found out, 5 from Greek Catholic Church, 4 from Other, 2 from Jehovah's Witnesses, 2 from Christian Congregations in Slovakia, 1 from Eastern Orthodox Church, 1 from Paganism and natural spirituality, 1 from Islam, 1 from Hinduism, 1 from United Methodist Church and 1 from Buddhism.

== Genealogical resources ==
The records for genealogical research are available at the state archive "Statny Archiv in Bratislava, Banska Bystrica, Bytca, Kosice, Levoca, Nitra, Presov, Slovakia"

- Roman Catholic church records (births/marriages/deaths): 1673-1895 (parish A)
- Lutheran church records (births/marriages/deaths): 1823-1946 (parish B)
- Reformated church records (births/marriages/deaths): 1784-1902 (parish B)

== See also ==
- List of municipalities and towns in Slovakia
