= Michal na Ostrove =

Michal na Ostrove Szentmihályfa
- Municipality
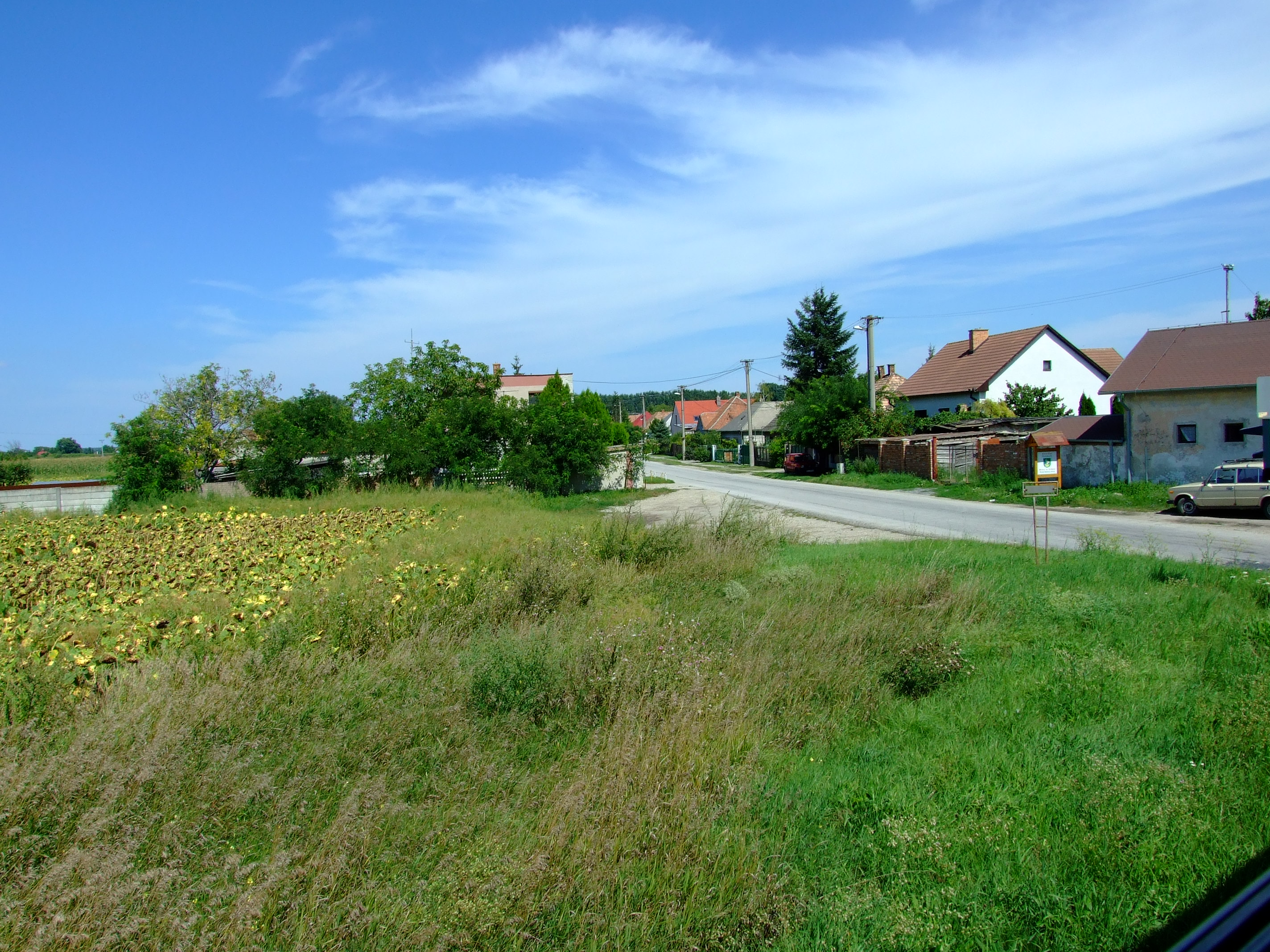

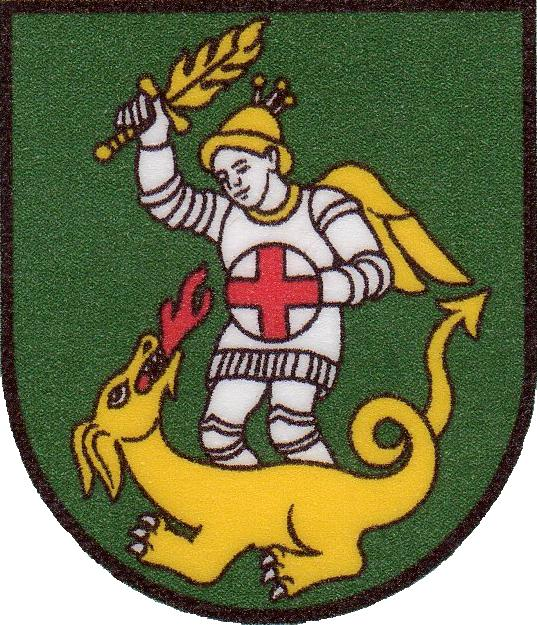
- Flag Coat of arms

- Location of Michal na Ostrove in the Trnava Region Location of Michal na Ostrove in Slovakia
- Coordinates: 48.02°N 17.51°E
- Country: Slovakia
- Region: Trnava Region
- District: Dunajská Streda District
- First mentioned: 1337

Government
  - Mayor: László Bögi (Party of the Hungarian Coalition)

Area
  - Total: 10.65 km^{2} (4.11 sq mi)
- Elevation: 118 m (387 ft)

Population (2025)
  - Total: 1,135

Ethnicity
  - Hungarians: 89,03 %
  - Slovaks: 8,16 %
- Time zone: UTC+1 (CET)
  - Summer (DST): UTC+2 (CEST)
- Postal code: 930 35
- Area code: +421 31
- Vehicle registration plate (until 2022): DS
- Website: www.michalnaostrove.sk

Michal na Ostrove (Hungarian: Szentmihályfa, pronounced [ˈsɛntmihaːjfɒ]) is a village and municipality in the Dunajská Streda District in the Trnava Region of south-west Slovakia.

== Geography ==
The municipality lies at an altitude of 118 metres (387 ft) and covers an area of 10.65 km^{2} (4.11 sq mi) (2025).

== History ==
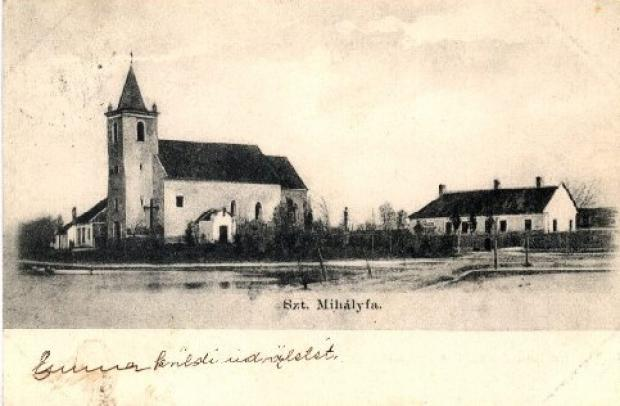
The Roman Catholic parish church

In the 9th century, the territory of Michal na Ostrove was part of Great Moravia. After Hungarian invasion, it became part of the Kingdom of Hungary. The village was first recorded in 1337 by its Hungarian name as Weke.

Until the end of World War I, it was part of Hungary and fell within the Dunaszerdahely district of Pozsony County. After the Austro-Hungarian army defeat and disintegration in November 1918, victory western powers established Czechoslovak administration, as part of cease-fire agreements. After official peaceful agreement of Hungary with USA, Britain and France, the Treaty of Trianon of 1920, the village became officially part of democratic Czechoslovakia. Hungarians agreed to full independence of Czechoslovakia and their borders. However, in November 1938, after agreement with Hitler, Nazi-cooperative Hungary took the area, so called First Vienna Award and this "award" was held by Hungary until 1945. After Soviets defeated German and Hungarian troops in 1945, Czechoslovak administration returned to the village. Following a socialistic coup in 1948, the village became part of socialistic Czechoslovakia until 1989. During 1989–1992 it was part of Czech and Slovak Federative Republic and since 1 January 1993 it is part of the Slovak Republic.

== Population ==
Population statistic (10 years)
Year	1995	2005	2015	2025
Count	690	837	960	1135
Difference		+21.30%	+14.69%	+18.22%

Population statistic
Year	2024	2025
Count	1119	1135
Difference		+1.42%

It has a population of 1135 people (31 December 2025).

In 1910, the village had 480, for the most part, Hungarian inhabitants.

=== Ethnicity ===
Census 2021 (1+ %)
Ethnicity	Number	Fraction
Hungarian	701	67.99%
Slovak	296	28.7%
Not found out	57	5.52%
Total	1031	

In year 2021 was 1031 people by ethnicity 701 as Hungarian, 296 as Slovak, 57 as Not found out, 8 as Czech, 6 as Romani, 3 as Russian, 2 as Romanian, 2 as German, 2 as Moravian, 1 as Turkish, 1 as Italian, 1 as Austrian, 1 as Other and 1 as Croatian.

Note on population: The difference values of population numbers in the table "Population statistic" and in the sections "Ethnicity" & "Religion" is caused by the use of various statistical methods.

=== Religion ===
Census 2021 (1+ %)
Religion	Number	Fraction
Roman Catholic Church	670	64.99%
None	195	18.91%
Not found out	56	5.43%
Calvinist Church	55	5.33%
Evangelical Church	22	2.13%
Greek Catholic Church	14	1.36%
Total	1031	

In year 2021 was 1031 people by religion 670 from Roman Catholic Church, 195 from None, 56 from Not found out, 55 from Calvinist Church, 22 from Evangelical Church, 14 from Greek Catholic Church, 8 from Christian Congregations in Slovakia, 4 from Buddhism, 3 from Old Catholic Church, 2 from Eastern Orthodox Church and 2 from Other.
