= Trstená na Ostrove =

Trstená na Ostrove Csallóköznádasd
- Municipality
- Flag

- Location of Trstená na Ostrove in the Trnava Region Location of Trstená na Ostrove in Slovakia
- Coordinates: 47.92°N 17.50°E
- Country: Slovakia
- Region: Trnava Region
- District: Dunajská Streda District
- First mentioned: 1250

Government
  - Mayor: Zuzana Bónová 2015- (Ind.)

Area
  - Total: 6.25 km^{2} (2.41 sq mi)
- Elevation: 116 m (381 ft)

Population (2025)
  - Total: 622

Ethnicity
  - Hungarians: 93,23 %
  - Slovaks: 6,39 %
- Time zone: UTC+1 (CET)
  - Summer (DST): UTC+2 (CEST)
- Postal code: 930 04
- Area code: +421 31
- Vehicle registration plate (until 2022): DS
- Website: www.trstenanaostrove.sk

Trstená na Ostrove (Hungarian: Csallóköznádasd, pronounced [ˈtʃɒlːoːkøznaːdɒʃd]) is a village and municipality in the Dunajská Streda District in the Trnava Region of south-west Slovakia.

== History ==
The village was first recorded in 1250. Until the end of World War I, it was part of Hungary and fell within the Dunaszerdahely district of Pozsony County. After the Austro-Hungarian army disintegrated in November 1918, Czechoslovak troops liberated the area. After the Treaty of Trianon of 1920, the village became officially part of Czechoslovakia. In November 1938, the First Vienna Award granted the area to Hungary and it was held by Hungary until 1945. The present-day municipality was formed in 1940 by unifying the three component villages. After Soviet occupation in 1945, Czechoslovak administration returned and the village became officially part of Czechoslovakia in 1947.

== Geography ==
The municipality lies at an altitude of 116 metres (381 ft) and covers an area of 6.25 km^{2} (2.41 sq mi) (2025).

== Population ==
Population statistic (10 years)
Year	1995	2005	2015	2025
Count	536	571	562	622
Difference		+6.52%	−1.57%	+10.67%

Population statistic
Year	2024	2025
Count	600	622
Difference		+3.66%

It has a population of 622 people (31 December 2025).

In 1910, the village had 507, for the most part, Hungarian inhabitants.

=== Ethnicity ===
Census 2021 (1+ %)
Ethnicity	Number	Fraction
Hungarian	488	84.42%
Slovak	100	17.3%
Not found out	17	2.94%
Total	578	

In year 2021 was 578 people by ethnicity 488 as Hungarian, 100 as Slovak, 17 as Not found out, 1 as Czech and 1 as Other.

Note on population: The difference values of population numbers in the table "Population statistic" and in the sections "Ethnicity" & "Religion" is caused by the use of various statistical methods.

=== Religion ===
Census 2021 (1+ %)
Religion	Number	Fraction
Roman Catholic Church	476	82.35%
None	67	11.59%
Christian Congregations in Slovakia	11	1.9%
Not found out	9	1.56%
Calvinist Church	8	1.38%
Total	578	

In year 2021 was 578 people by religion 476 from Roman Catholic Church, 67 from None, 11 from Christian Congregations in Slovakia, 9 from Not found out, 8 from Calvinist Church, 5 from Greek Catholic Church, 1 from Other and 1 from Evangelical Church.
