= Hviezdoslavov =

Hviezdoslavov Hviezdoslavfalva
- Municipality
- Flag

- Location of Hviezdoslavov in the Trnava Region Location of Hviezdoslavov in Slovakia
- Coordinates: 48.07°N 17.35°E
- Country: Slovakia
- Region: Trnava Region
- District: Dunajská Streda District
- First mentioned: 1936

Government
  - Mayor: František Kavecký (Independent)

Area
  - Total: 10.56 km^{2} (4.08 sq mi)
- Elevation: 126 m (413 ft)

Population (2025)
  - Total: 4,028

Ethnicity
  - Hungarians: 45.10 %
  - Slovaks: 47.77 %
- Time zone: UTC+1 (CET)
  - Summer (DST): UTC+2 (CEST)
- Postal code: 930 41
- Area code: +421 31
- Vehicle registration plate (until 2022): DS
- Website: www.hviezdoslavov.sk

Hviezdoslavov (Hungarian: Hviezdoslavfalva, pronounced [ˈhviɛzdoʃlɒvfɒlvɒ], or Vörösmajor) is a village and municipality in the Dunajská Streda District in the Trnava Region of south-west Slovakia.

== Geography ==
The municipality lies at an altitude of 126 metres (413 ft) and covers an area of 10.56 km^{2} (4.08 sq mi) (2025).

== History ==
In the 9th century, the territory of Hviezdoslavov became part of the Kingdom of Hungary. In historical records, the village was first mentioned in 1921. It was founded in the same year as part of a colonisation program by which Slovak and Czech colonies were set up within the framework of official and private colonisation of areas with ethnic Hungarian majority.

== Population ==
Population statistic (10 years)
Year	1995	2005	2015	2025
Count	290	369	1153	4028
Difference		+27.24%	+212.46%	+249.34%

Population statistic
Year	2024	2025
Count	3772	4028
Difference		+6.78%

It has a population of 4028 people (31 December 2025).

=== Ethnicity ===
Census 2021 (1+ %)
Ethnicity	Number	Fraction
Slovak	2119	85.72%
Hungarian	198	8%
Not found out	126	5.09%
Czech	30	1.21%
Total	2472	

In year 2021 was 2472 people by ethnicity 2119 as Slovak, 198 as Hungarian, 126 as Not found out, 30 as Czech, 20 as Other, 14 as Ukrainian, 14 as German, 13 as Rusyn, 10 as Russian, 8 as Romanian, 6 as Serbian, 5 as Polish, 4 as Jewish, 4 as Romani, 4 as Bulgarian, 3 as Croatian, 1 as Vietnamese and 1 as Moravian.

Note on population: The difference values of population numbers in the table "Population statistic" and in the sections "Ethnicity" & "Religion" is caused by the use of various statistical methods.

=== Religion ===
Census 2021 (1+ %)
Religion	Number	Fraction
Roman Catholic Church	1042	42.15%
None	1000	40.45%
Not found out	132	5.34%
Greek Catholic Church	78	3.16%
Evangelical Church	78	3.16%
Total	2472	

In year 2021 was 2472 people by religion 1042 from Roman Catholic Church, 1000 from None, 132 from Not found out, 78 from Greek Catholic Church, 78 from Evangelical Church, 21 from Eastern Orthodox Church, 17 from Other and not ascertained christian church, 17 from Other, 14 from Ad hoc movements, 13 from Calvinist Church, 11 from Christian Congregations in Slovakia, 10 from Jehovah's Witnesses, 6 from Islam, 6 from Buddhism, 5 from Paganism and natural spirituality, 5 from United Methodist Church, 5 from Seventh-day Adventist Church, 5 from Baptists Church, 4 from Apostolic Church, 1 from Jewish community, 1 from Hinduism and 1 from Czechoslovak Hussite Church.

The 2021 Census recorded population of the village as 2,472 people. 2,100 (85%) are Slovaks, 181 people (7.3%) Hungarians and 119 (4.8%) others nationality.

Roman Catholicism is the majority religion of the village, with its adherents numbering 66.85% of the total population, while 19.29 per cent of the respondents did not belong to any denomination

== See also ==
- List of municipalities and towns in Slovakia

== Genealogical resources ==
The records for genealogical research are available at the state archive "Statny Archiv in Bratislava, Slovakia"
