= Oľdza =

Oľdza Olgya
- Municipality
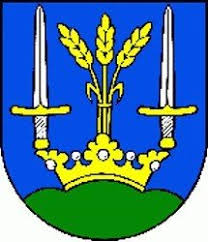
- Flag Coat of arms

- Location of Oľdza in the Trnava Region Location of Oľdza in Slovakia
- Coordinates: 48.09°N 17.42°E
- Country: Slovakia
- Region: Trnava Region
- District: Dunajská Streda District
- First mentioned: 1239

Government
  - Mayor: Ildiko Gyurcsiova

Area
  - Total: 8.86 km^{2} (3.42 sq mi)
- Elevation: 123 m (404 ft)

Population (2025)
  - Total: 648

Ethnicity
  - Hungarians: 49%
  - Slovaks: 51%
- Time zone: UTC+1 (CET)
  - Summer (DST): UTC+2 (CEST)
- Postal code: 930 39
- Area code: +421 31
- Vehicle registration plate (until 2022): DS
- Website: www.oldza.sk

Oľdza (Hungarian: Olgya, pronounced [ˈolɟɒ]) is a village and municipality in the Dunajská Streda District in the Trnava Region of south-west Slovakia.

== Geography ==
The municipality lies at an altitude of 123 metres (404 ft) and covers an area of 8.86 km^{2} (3.42 sq mi) (2025).

== History ==
The village was first recorded in 1239 as Olgia. Until the end of World War I, it was part of Hungary and fell within the Somorja district of Pozsony County. After the Austro-Hungarian army disintegrated in November 1918, Czechoslovak troops occupied the area. After the Treaty of Trianon of 1920, the village became officially part of Czechoslovakia. In November 1938, the First Vienna Award granted the area to Hungary and it was held and occupied by Hungary until 1945. After the Soviet army occupied the territory in 1945, Czechoslovak administration returned and the village became officially part of Czechoslovakia in 1947.

== Population ==
Population statistic (10 years)
Year	1995	2005	2015	2025
Count	268	322	465	648
Difference		+20.14%	+44.40%	+39.35%

Population statistic
Year	2024	2025
Count	641	648
Difference		+1.09%

It has a population of 648 people (31 December 2025).

In 1910, the village had 209, for the most part, Hungarian inhabitants.

=== Ethnicity ===
Census 2021 (1+ %)
Ethnicity	Number	Fraction
Slovak	317	56.7%
Hungarian	244	43.64%
Not found out	21	3.75%
Total	559	

In year 2021 was 559 people by ethnicity 317 as Slovak, 244 as Hungarian, 21 as Not found out, 4 as Rusyn, 2 as Czech, 2 as German, 1 as Romani and 1 as Other.

Note on population: The difference values of population numbers in the table "Population statistic" and in the sections "Ethnicity" & "Religion" is caused by the use of various statistical methods.

=== Religion ===
Census 2021 (1+ %)
Religion	Number	Fraction
Roman Catholic Church	333	59.57%
None	159	28.44%
Evangelical Church	27	4.83%
Not found out	19	3.4%
Greek Catholic Church	10	1.79%
Total	559	

In year 2021 was 559 people by religion 333 from Roman Catholic Church, 159 from None, 27 from Evangelical Church, 19 from Not found out, 10 from Greek Catholic Church, 4 from Christian Congregations in Slovakia, 3 from Calvinist Church, 2 from Eastern Orthodox Church, 1 from Other and 1 from Ad hoc movements.
