= Kútniky =

Kútniky Hegyéte
- Municipality
- Flag

- Location of Kútniky in the Trnava Region Location of Kútniky in Slovakia
- Coordinates: 47.98°N 17.66°E
- Country: Slovakia
- Region: Trnava Region
- District: Dunajská Streda District
- First mentioned: 1380

Government
  - Mayor: Ferenc Bokros

Area
  - Total: 10.97 km^{2} (4.24 sq mi)
- Elevation: 114 m (374 ft)

Population (2025)
  - Total: 1,483

Ethnicity
  - Hungarians: 87.45 %
  - Slovaks: 8.69 %
- Time zone: UTC+1 (CET)
  - Summer (DST): UTC+2 (CEST)
- Postal code: 929 01
- Area code: +421 31
- Vehicle registration plate (until 2022): DS
- Website: www.kutniky.home.sk

Kútniky (Hungarian: Hegyéte, pronounced [ˈhɛɟeːtɛ]) is a village and municipality in the Dunajská Streda District in the Trnava Region of south-west Slovakia.

== Geography ==
The municipality lies at an altitude of 114 metres (374 ft) and covers an area of 10.97 km^{2} (4.24 sq mi) (2025).

== History ==
In the 9th century, the territory of Kútniky became part of the Kingdom of Hungary. In historical records, Hegybeneéte a component village of the municipality was mentioned in 1380. In 1910 Hegybeneéte village had 192, while Töböréte village 165, for the most part, Hungarian inhabitants. Until the end of World War I, it was part of Hungary and fell within the Dunaszerdahely district of Pozsony County. After the Austro-Hungarian army disintegrated in November 1918, Czechoslovak troops occupied the area. After the Treaty of Trianon of 1920, the village became officially part of Czechoslovakia. In November 1938, the First Vienna Award granted the area to Hungary and it was held by Hungary until 1945. Hegybeneéte and Töböréte villages were unified in 1940 under the name of Hegyéte, to which Blažov (Balázsfa) and Podafa villages were attached in 1960, but the latter became independent in 1990 again.

After Soviet occupation in 1945, Czechoslovak administration returned and the village became officially part of Czechoslovakia in 1947.

== Population ==
Population statistic (10 years)
Year	1995	2005	2015	2025
Count	831	1094	1372	1483
Difference		+31.64%	+25.41%	+8.09%

Population statistic
Year	2024	2025
Count	1505	1483
Difference		−1.46%

It has a population of 1483 people (31 December 2025).

=== Ethnicity ===
Census 2021 (1+ %)
Ethnicity	Number	Fraction
Hungarian	1169	79.74%
Slovak	293	19.98%
Not found out	60	4.09%
Total	1466	

In year 2021 was 1466 people by ethnicity 1169 as Hungarian, 293 as Slovak, 60 as Not found out, 12 as Czech, 7 as Other, 2 as German, 1 as Ukrainian, 1 as Romani, 1 as Rusyn, 1 as French and 1 as Bulgarian.

Note on population: The difference values of population numbers in the table "Population statistic" and in the sections "Ethnicity" & "Religion" is caused by the use of various statistical methods.

=== Religion ===
Census 2021 (1+ %)
Religion	Number	Fraction
Roman Catholic Church	902	61.53%
None	347	23.67%
Calvinist Church	105	7.16%
Not found out	48	3.27%
Evangelical Church	36	2.46%
Greek Catholic Church	15	1.02%
Total	1466	

In year 2021 was 1466 people by religion 902 from Roman Catholic Church, 347 from None, 105 from Calvinist Church, 48 from Not found out, 36 from Evangelical Church, 15 from Greek Catholic Church, 3 from Jehovah's Witnesses, 2 from Eastern Orthodox Church, 2 from Christian Congregations in Slovakia, 2 from Other, 1 from Jewish community, 1 from Other and not ascertained christian church, 1 from Islam and 1 from Buddhism.
