= Horná Potôň =

Horná Potôň Felsőpatony
- Municipality
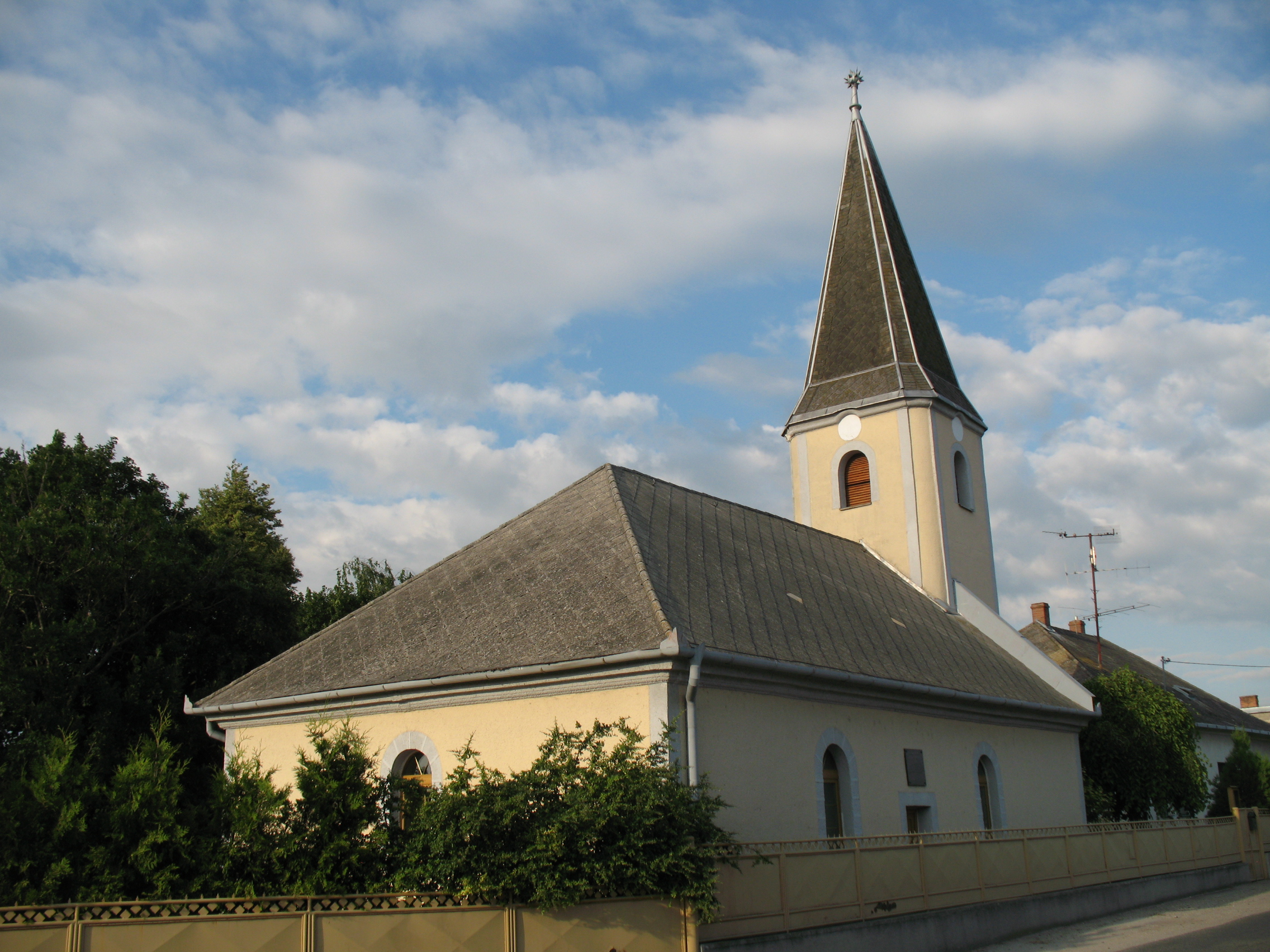

- Flag

- Location of Horná Potôň in the Trnava Region Location of Horná Potôň in Slovakia
- Coordinates: 48°02′19″N 17°29′45″E
- Country: Slovakia
- Region: Trnava Region
- District: Dunajská Streda District
- First mentioned: 1250

Government
  - Mayor: Tivadar Sidó

Area
  - Total: 33.30 km^{2} (12.86 sq mi)
- Elevation: 123 m (404 ft)

Population (2025)
  - Total: 2,269

Ethnicity
  - Hungarians: 93.86%
  - Slovaks: 5.61%
- Time zone: UTC+1 (CET)
  - Summer (DST): UTC+2 (CEST)
- Postal code: 930 36
- Area code: +421 31
- Vehicle registration plate (until 2022): DS
- Website: www.hornapoton.sk

Horná Potôň (Hungarian: Felsőpatony, pronounced [ˈfɛlʃøːpɒtoɲ]) is a village and municipality in the Dunajská Streda District in the Trnava Region of south-west Slovakia.

== History ==
In historical records the village was first mentioned in 1250. Until the end of World War I, it was part of Hungary and fell within the Dunaszerdahely district of Pozsony County. After the Austro-Hungarian army disintegrated in November 1918, Czechoslovak troops occupied the area. Under the Treaty of Trianon of 1920, it became officially part of Czechoslovakia and fell within Bratislava County until 1927. In November 1938, the First Vienna Award granted the area to Hungary and it was held by Hungary until 1945. In 1940, Lögérpatony (Horná Potôň) and Benkepatony (Benkova Potôň) were unified, since it has been called in Hungarian as Felsőpatony, while in Slovak it is known as Horná Potôň. After the Soviet occupation in 1945, Czechoslovak administration returned and the village became officially part of Czechoslovakia by the Paris Peace Treaties in 1947. In 1960, Čečinska Potôň (Csécsénypatony) was also attached to the village.

== Geography ==
The municipality lies at an altitude of 123 metres (404 ft) and covers an area of 33.30 km^{2} (12.86 sq mi) (2025).

== See also ==
- List of municipalities and towns in Slovakia

== Population ==
Population statistic (10 years)
Year	1995	2005	2015	2025
Count	1846	1809	1961	2269
Difference		−2.00%	+8.40%	+15.70%

Population statistic
Year	2024	2025
Count	2260	2269
Difference		+0.39%

It has a population of 2269 people (31 December 2025).

=== Ethnicity ===
Census 2021 (1+ %)
Ethnicity	Number	Fraction
Hungarian	1437	67.97%
Slovak	640	30.27%
Not found out	140	6.62%
Total	2114	

In year 2021 was 2114 people by ethnicity 1437 as Hungarian, 640 as Slovak, 140 as Not found out, 12 as Czech, 5 as Russian, 3 as German, 2 as Rusyn, 2 as Other, 1 as Ukrainian, 1 as Romani, 1 as Polish and 1 as Bulgarian.

Note on population: The difference values of population numbers in the table "Population statistic" and in the sections "Ethnicity" & "Religion" is caused by the use of various statistical methods.

=== Religion ===
Census 2021 (1+ %)
Religion	Number	Fraction
Roman Catholic Church	1235	58.42%
None	537	25.4%
Calvinist Church	149	7.05%
Not found out	106	5.01%
Evangelical Church	32	1.51%
Total	2114	

In year 2021 was 2114 people by religion 1235 from Roman Catholic Church, 537 from None, 149 from Calvinist Church, 106 from Not found out, 32 from Evangelical Church, 19 from Greek Catholic Church, 11 from Christian Congregations in Slovakia, 6 from Islam, 5 from Other and not ascertained christian church, 3 from Eastern Orthodox Church, 3 from United Methodist Church, 3 from Ad hoc movements, 2 from Buddhism, 1 from Old Catholic Church, 1 from Other and 1 from Hinduism.

== Genealogical resources ==
The records for genealogical research are available at the state archive "Statny Archiv in Bratislava, Slovakia"

- Roman Catholic church records (births/marriages/deaths): 1728-1899 (parish B)
- Reformated church records (births/marriages/deaths): 1783-1912 (parish B)
