= Kľúčovec =

Kľúčovec Kulcsod
- Municipality
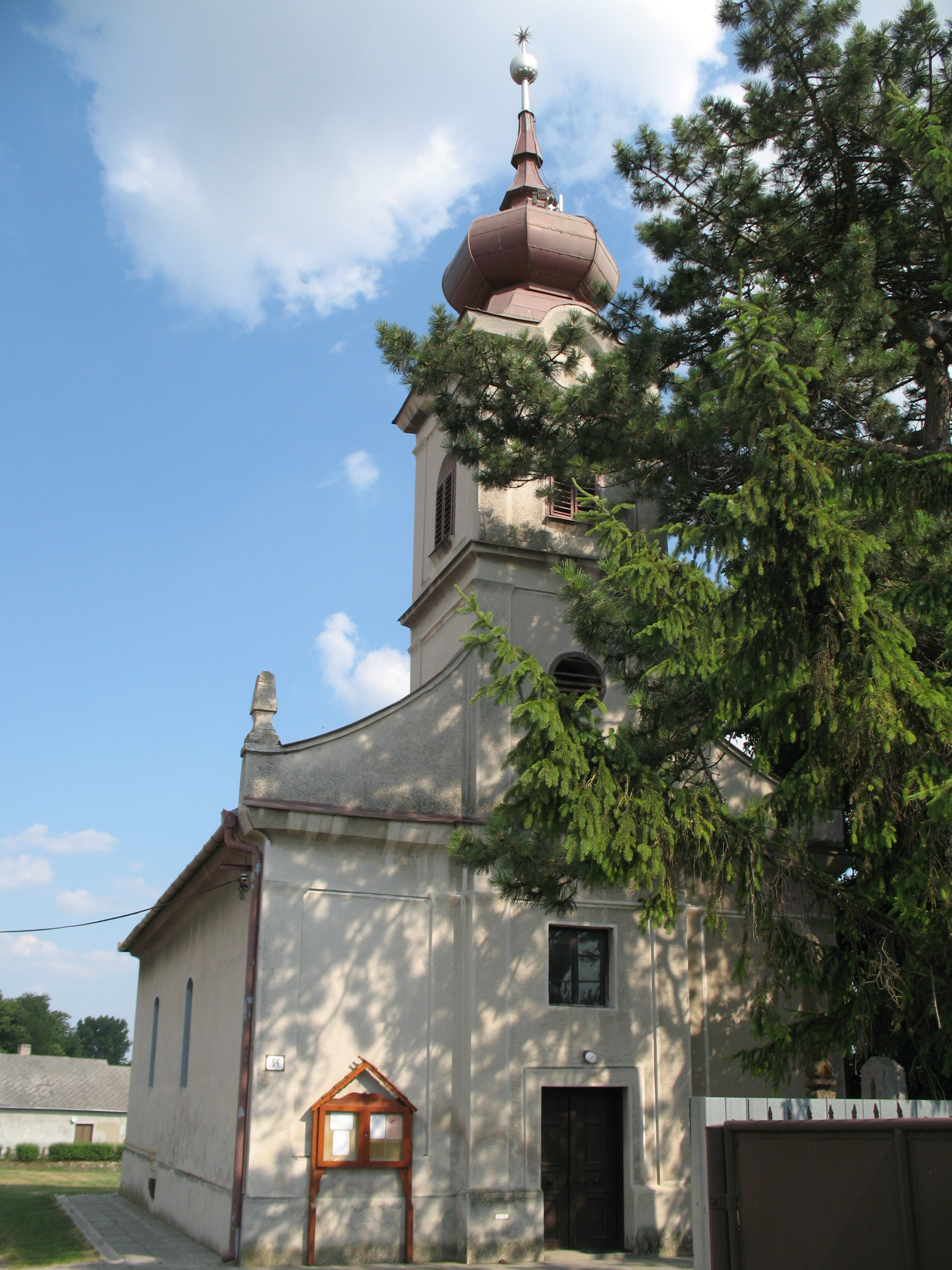

- Flag Coat of arms

- Location of Kľúčovec in the Trnava Region Location of Kľúčovec in Slovakia
- Coordinates: 47.79°N 17.72°E
- Country: Slovakia
- Region: Trnava Region
- District: Dunajská Streda District
- First mentioned: 1252

Government
  - Mayor: Csaba Bognár (Independent)

Area
  - Total: 12.93 km^{2} (4.99 sq mi)
- Elevation: 110 m (360 ft)

Population (2025)
  - Total: 340

Ethnicity
  - Hungarians: 98.12 %
  - Slovaks: 1.34 %
- Time zone: UTC+1 (CET)
  - Summer (DST): UTC+2 (CEST)
- Postal code: 930 07
- Area code: +421 31
- Vehicle registration plate (until 2022): DS
- Website: klucovec.sk

Kľúčovec (Hungarian: Kulcsod, pronounced [ˈkultʃod]) is a village and municipality in the Dunajská Streda District in the Trnava Region of south-west Slovakia.

== Geography ==
The municipality lies at an altitude of 110 metres (360 ft) and covers an area of 12.93 km^{2} (4.99 sq mi) (2025).

== History ==
In the 9th century, the territory of Kľúčovec became part of the Kingdom of Hungary. In historical records the village was first mentioned in 1252 as "Kwichud" when King Béla IV of Hungary donated the village to the provostship of Túróc (now: Turiec). Until the end of World War I, the village was part of Hungary and fell within the Tószigetcsilizköz district of Győr County. After the Austro-Hungarian army disintegrated in November 1918, Czechoslovak troops occupied the area. After the Treaty of Trianon of 1920, the village became officially part of Czechoslovakia. In November 1938, the First Vienna Award granted the area to Hungary and it was held by Hungary until 1945. After Soviet occupation in 1945, Czechoslovak administration returned and the village became officially part of Czechoslovakia in 1947.

== Population ==
Population statistic (10 years)
Year	1995	2005	2015	2025
Count	347	390	364	340
Difference		+12.39%	−6.66%	−6.59%

Population statistic
Year	2024	2025
Count	345	340
Difference		−1.44%

It has a population of 340 people (31 December 2025).

=== Ethnicity ===
Census 2021 (1+ %)
Ethnicity	Number	Fraction
Hungarian	316	87.29%
Slovak	46	12.7%
Not found out	19	5.24%
Ukrainian	4	1.1%
Total	362	

In year 2021 was 362 people by ethnicity 316 as Hungarian, 46 as Slovak, 19 as Not found out, 4 as Ukrainian, 3 as Russian, 2 as Czech, 1 as Austrian and 1 as Other.

Note on population: The difference values of population numbers in the table "Population statistic" and in the sections "Ethnicity" & "Religion" is caused by the use of various statistical methods.

=== Religion ===
Census 2021 (1+ %)
Religion	Number	Fraction
Calvinist Church	247	68.23%
Roman Catholic Church	47	12.98%
None	43	11.88%
Not found out	8	2.21%
Evangelical Church	7	1.93%
Eastern Orthodox Church	4	1.1%
Total	362	

In year 2021 was 362 people by religion 247 from Calvinist Church, 47 from Roman Catholic Church, 43 from None, 8 from Not found out, 7 from Evangelical Church, 4 from Eastern Orthodox Church, 3 from Other and not ascertained christian church, 1 from Other, 1 from Greek Catholic Church and 1 from Buddhism.

== See also ==
- List of municipalities and towns in Slovakia

== Genealogical resources ==
The records for genealogical research are available at the state archive "Statny Archiv in Bratislava, Slovakia"

- Roman Catholic church records (births/marriages/deaths): 1731-1898 (parish B)
- Reformated church records (births/marriages/deaths): 1791-1896 (parish A)
