= Dunajská Streda District =

Coordinates: 47°59′33″N 17°37′1″E

- District
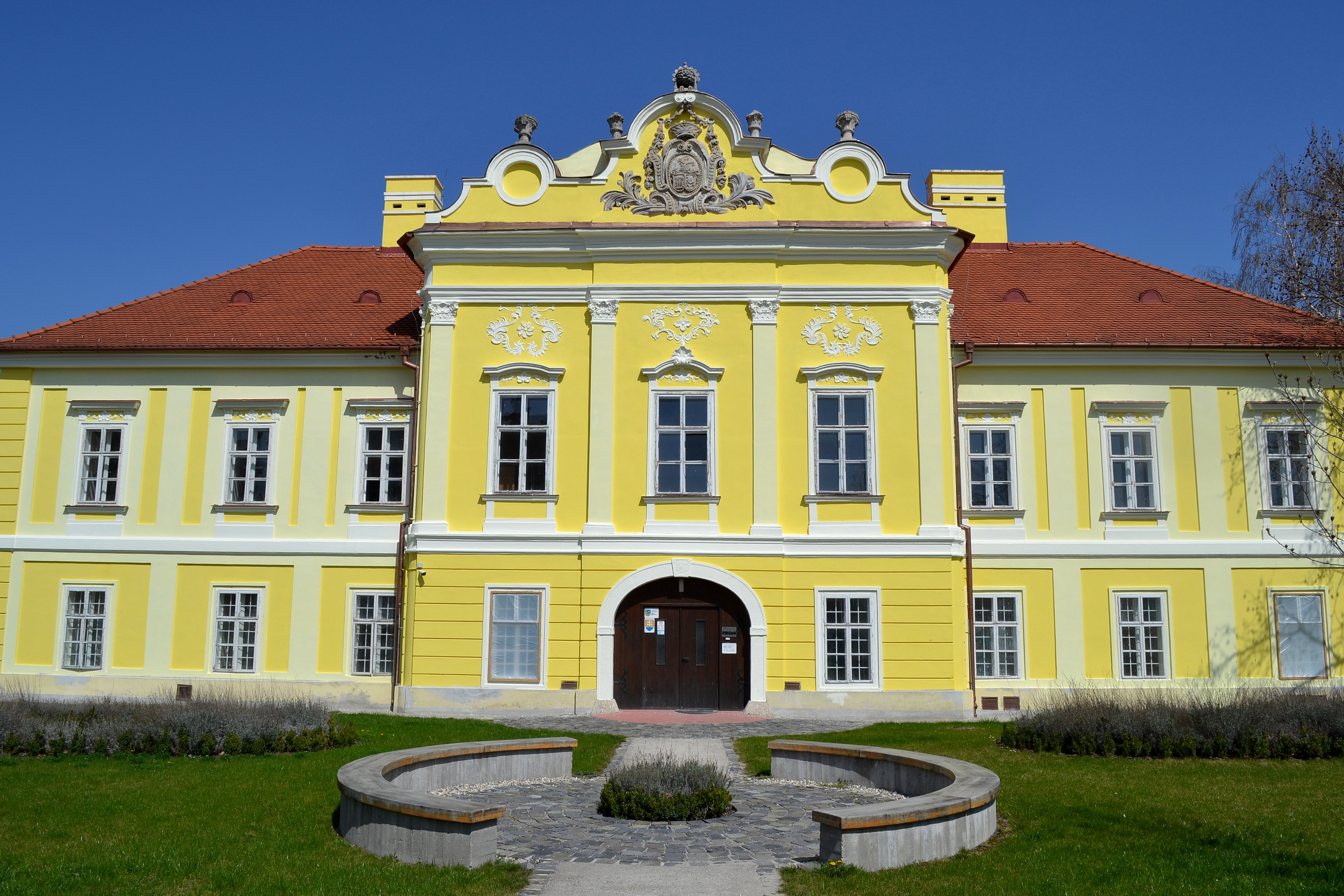
- Country: Slovakia
- Region (kraj): Trnava Region
- Seat: Dunajská Streda

Area
  - Total: 1,074.58 km^{2} (414.90 sq mi)

Population (2025)
  - Total: 128,458
- Time zone: UTC+1 (CET)
  - Summer (DST): UTC+2 (CEST)
- Telephone prefix: 031
- Vehicle registration plate (until 2022): DS
- Municipalities: 67

Dunajská Streda District (Slovak: okres Dunajská Streda, Hungarian: Dunaszerdahelyi járás) is a district in the Trnava Region of western Slovakia. Until 1918, the district was mostly part of the county of Kingdom of Hungary of Pozsony, apart from a small area in the south, which formed part of the county of Komárno, and Baloň, which formed part of the county of Győr.

The majority of the inhabitants of Dunajská Streda District are Hungarians.

== Population ==
Population statistic (10 years)
Year	1995	2005	2015	2025
Count	111,100	114,788	119,306	128,458
Difference		+3.31%	+3.93%	+7.67%

Population statistic
Year	2024	2025
Count	127,827	128,458
Difference		+0.49%

It has a population of 128,458 people (31 December 2025).

Historical population
Year	Pop.	±%
1970	94,498	—
1980	104,096	+10.2%
1991	109,345	+5.0%
2001	112,384	+2.8%
2011	116,492	+3.7%
2021	124,669	+7.0%
Source: Statistical Office of the Slovak Republic

=== Ethnicity ===
Census 2021 (1+ %)
Ethnicity	Number	Fraction
Hungarian	88,495	66.27%
Slovak	33,056	24.75%
Not found out	7588	5.68%
Romani	2200	1.64%
Total	133,530	

In year 2021 was 133,530 people by ethnicity 88,495 as Hungarian, 33,056 as Slovak, 7588 as Not found out, 2200 as Romani, 733 as Czech, 359 as Other, 168 as Ukrainian, 147 as Russian, 147 as German, 102 as Rusyn, 66 as Polish, 56 as Serbian, 50 as Vietnamese, 45 as Jewish, 44 as Romanian, 36 as Moravian, 35 as Italian, 32 as Bulgarian, 27 as Austrian, 20 as Croatian, 19 as English, 18 as Chinese, 18 as Turkish, 17 as Greek, 16 as Iranian, 16 as Albanian, 12 as French, 3 as Irish, 3 as Canadian and 2 as Silesian.

Note on population: The difference values of population numbers in the table "Population statistic" and in the sections "Ethnicity" & "Religion" is caused by the use of various statistical methods.

=== Religion ===
Census 2021 (1+ %)
Religion	Number	Fraction
Roman Catholic Church	75,961	60.93%
None	26,896	21.57%
Calvinist Church	8625	6.92%
Not found out	7253	5.82%
Evangelical Church	2255	1.81%
Total	124,669	

In year 2021 was 124,669 people by religion 75,961 from Roman Catholic Church, 26,896 from None, 8625 from Calvinist Church, 7253 from Not found out, 2255 from Evangelical Church, 1200 from Greek Catholic Church, 680 from Christian Congregations in Slovakia, 283 from Other and not ascertained christian church, 271 from Jehovah's Witnesses, 232 from Eastern Orthodox Church, 215 from Other, 147 from Buddhism, 130 from Ad hoc movements, 105 from Islam, 86 from Old Catholic Church, 83 from United Methodist Church, 65 from Jewish community, 48 from Baptists Church, 45 from Apostolic Church, 44 from Paganism and natural spirituality, 14 from Hinduism, 12 from Seventh-day Adventist Church, 8 from Czechoslovak Hussite Church, 5 from Church of Jesus Christ of Latter-day Saints, 4 from Church of the Brethren and 2 from New Apostolic Church.

== Municipalities ==
Municipality	Area [km^{2}]	Population
Báč	3.92	558
Baka	19.98	1,137
Baloň	16.07	721
Bellova Ves	6.92	357
Blahová	11.37	468
Blatná na Ostrove	10.77	978
Bodíky	24.75	291
Boheľov	8.26	359
Čakany	11.18	640
Čenkovce	5.54	1,092
Čiližská Radvaň	21.41	1,148
Dobrohošť	4.85	547
Dolný Bar	8.19	1,022
Dolný Štál	29.99	1,916
Dunajská Streda	31.45	22,720
Dunajský Klátov	4.57	898
Gabčíkovo	52.39	5,300
Holice	23.97	2,149
Horná Potôň	33.30	2,269
Horné Mýto	12.10	926
Horný Bar	11.77	1,311
Hubice	5.35	691
Hviezdoslavov	10.56	4,028
Jahodná	15.69	1,705
Janíky	13.23	974
Jurová	10.73	476
Kľúčovec	12.93	340
Kostolné Kračany	13.91	1,519
Kráľovičove Kračany	13.27	1,137
Kútniky	10.97	1,483
Kvetoslavov	8.09	2,216
Kyselica	3.49	290
Lehnice	25.38	3,413
Lúč na Ostrove	15.89	740
Macov	2.72	537
Mad	7.71	579
Malé Dvorníky	6.88	1,193
Medveďov	10.46	529
Mierovo	6.12	456
Michal na Ostrove	10.65	1,135
Ňárad	10.44	658
Nový Život	22.48	2,298
Ohrady	14.76	1,353
Okoč	63.42	3,659
Oľdza	8.86	648
Orechová Potôň	23.02	1,645
Padáň	17.00	876
Pataš	9.38	830
Potônske Lúky	0.00	286
Povoda	6.01	961
Rohovce	16.14	1,072
Sap	12.54	503
Šamorín	44.34	13,622
Štvrtok na Ostrove	13.06	1,757
Topoľníky	34.81	3,102
Trhová Hradská	24.75	2,153
Trnávka	7.97	583
Trstená na Ostrove	6.25	622
Veľká Paka	16.46	1,099
Veľké Blahovo	18.13	1,569
Veľké Dvorníky	7.99	1,368
Veľký Meder	55.54	8,163
Vieska	3.95	424
Vojka nad Dunajom	8.21	464
Vrakúň	38.33	2,958
Vydrany	16.04	1,976
Zlaté Klasy	17.99	3,561

Population and area values are current for year 2025.

== See also ==
- Komárno District also Hungarian majority
