= Madunice =

- Municipality
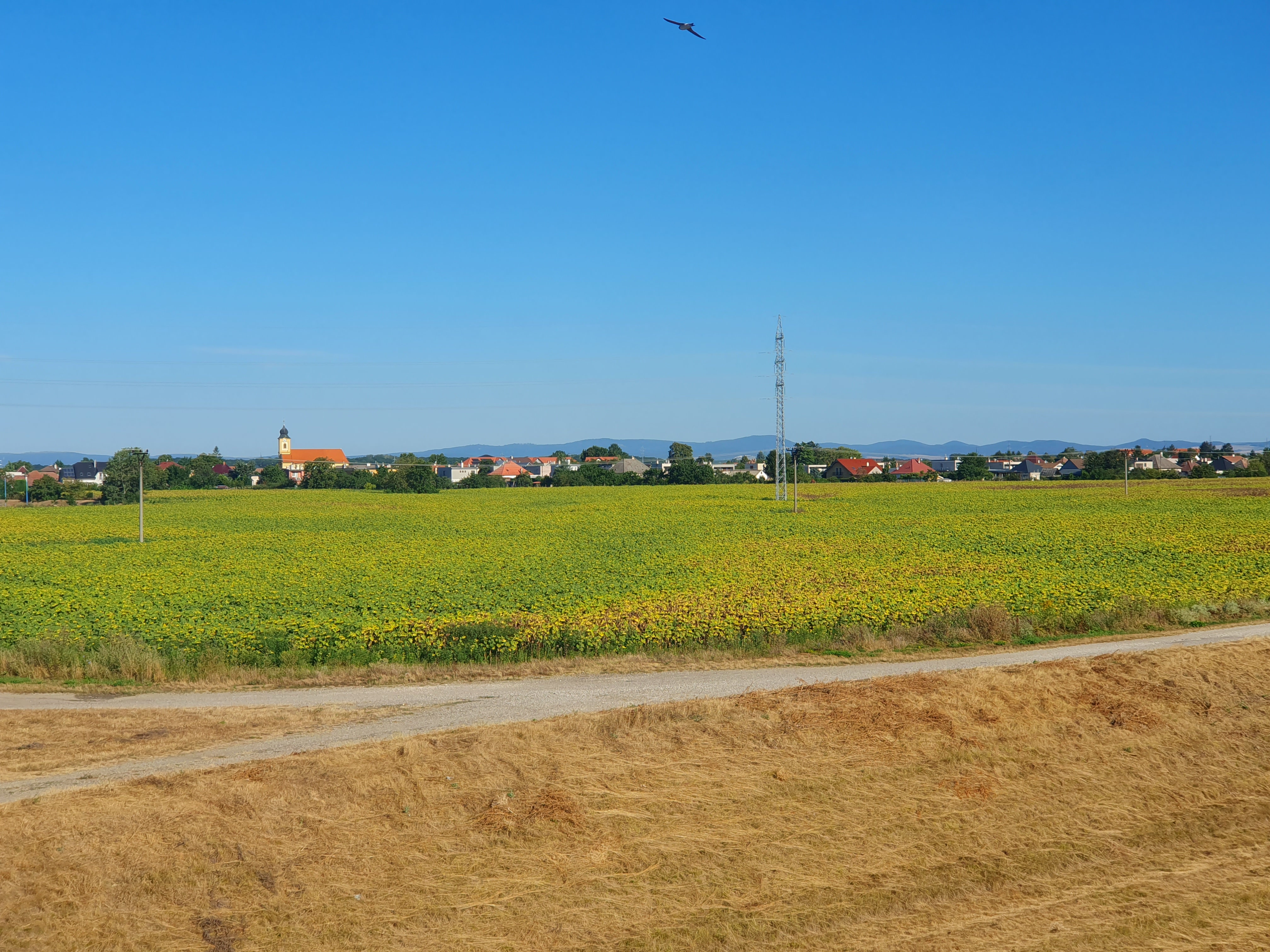

- Flag

- Location of Madunice in the Trnava Region Location of Madunice in Slovakia
- Coordinates: 48.52°N 17.80°E
- Country: Slovakia
- Region: Trnava Region
- District: Hlohovec District
- First mentioned: 1113

Area
  - Total: 11.93 km^{2} (4.61 sq mi)
- Elevation: 147 m (482 ft)

Population (2025)
  - Total: 2,343
- Time zone: UTC+1 (CET)
  - Summer (DST): UTC+2 (CEST)
- Postal code: 922 42
- Area code: +421 33
- Vehicle registration plate (until 2022): HC
- Website: www.madunice.sk

Madunice (Slovak: [ˈmaduɲitse]; Hungarian: Vágmedence) is a village and municipality in Hlohovec District in the Trnava Region of Slovakia.

== Geography ==
The municipality lies at an altitude of 147 metres (482 ft) and covers an area of 11.93 km^{2} (4.61 sq mi) (2025).

== Etymology ==
The name comes from the Slovak word medunica: a honey plant, in Western Slovak dialects madunica.

== Situation ==
Madunice is situated on the right bank of river Váh, approximately one kilometer away from the river. North of Madunice are Drahovce, on east Koplotovce, on south Červeník and Leopoldov and on west Pečeňady.

== Transportation ==
Road no. 61 leads through Madunice. It is also accessible from highway D1, exit 72 – Červeník. Madunice lie on the 106.6th kilometer of Váh fairway. In the town, there are four bus stops. Buses in directions to Piešťany, Trnava, Hlohovec and Veľké Kostoľany stop here. Certain long-line buses stop here as well.

Close to the town is the main Slovak railway corridor Bratislava – Žilina – Čierna nad Tisou. Kilometer away from the town center there is a former building of a train stop, nowadays an object of the Slovak railway company. By 2008, the modernization of the corridor should be finished. Within the modernization, the old platforms were demolished and replaced by new, higher, and wheelchair-accessible platforms. The railway crossing was abandoned and an underpass for pedestrians was built. The nearest airport is in Piešťany, 15 kilometres (9.3 mi) away.

== Population ==
Population statistic (10 years)
Year	1995	2005	2015	2025
Count	1863	2038	2208	2343
Difference		+9.39%	+8.34%	+6.11%

Population statistic
Year	2024	2025
Count	2340	2343
Difference		+0.12%

It has a population of 2343 people (31 December 2025).

=== Ethnicity ===
Census 2021 (1+ %)
Ethnicity	Number	Fraction
Slovak	2167	95.29%
Not found out	100	4.39%
Total	2274	

In year 2021 was 2274 people by ethnicity 2167 as Slovak, 100 as Not found out, 17 as Czech, 4 as Romani, 4 as Russian, 4 as Hungarian, 3 as Ukrainian, 3 as German, 2 as Italian, 1 as Rusyn, 1 as Austrian, 1 as Polish, 1 as Other, 1 as French and 1 as Albanian.

Note on population: The difference values of population numbers in the table "Population statistic" and in the sections "Ethnicity" & "Religion" is caused by the use of various statistical methods.

=== Religion ===
Census 2021 (1+ %)
Religion	Number	Fraction
Roman Catholic Church	1582	69.57%
None	485	21.33%
Not found out	111	4.88%
Total	2274	

In year 2021 was 2274 people by religion 1582 from Roman Catholic Church, 485 from None, 111 from Not found out, 22 from Christian Congregations in Slovakia, 18 from Evangelical Church, 13 from Greek Catholic Church, 10 from Other, 10 from Ad hoc movements, 6 from Jehovah's Witnesses, 5 from Calvinist Church, 3 from Paganism and natural spirituality, 2 from Eastern Orthodox Church, 2 from Other and not ascertained christian church, 2 from Seventh-day Adventist Church, 1 from Islam, 1 from United Methodist Church and 1 from Buddhism.

== Municipal property ==
The town is connected to electrical and gas supply, and has an independent water supply. Sewage is under construction, before that, the waste water was stored in septic tanks. Communal and sorted waste are regularly collected and liquidated. The center of Madunice is the local square. The new House of Culture is situated here, with a town hall, post-office, pharmacy, restaurant and more. A public park is located right next to the square. There are many Services and shops. There is a kindergarten and a school in Madunice. Many cultural events are held at the Amphitheatre. A football stadium is also present. There is a Roman Catholic Church of Birth of Virgin Mary and a cemetery. On the Váh Canal is the Madunice power plant. On the town limits the agriculture company has its base. About 750 meters behind the town there is an "industrial estate" with various firms.

== Culture ==
=== Church of Birth of Virgin Mary ===
By the main road near the center is the Roman Catholic Church. It is a single-nave hall with a sacristy on the right side of the church. In the church there is a side altar made from an oak, under which Ján Hollý composed his poems. Next to the church, there was once a cemetery, but it was moved to a new place. In front of the church is a small park with a larger than life-size statue of Hollý. As of 2006 a reconstruction of the church was in progress.

=== Amphitheatre ===
An amphitheatre with a snack bar and a stage is located on the east part of Madunice. Concerts, discos and the Onion festival take place here.

=== Onion festival ===
In August, the Onion festival is held. It takes for three days. Games are played, for example the competition for the longest onion garland. A fair comes to the town and steeplechase is performed. The onion parade goes from the center to the Amphitheatre. Live music is played.

=== Ján Hollý ===
Ján Hollý lived in Madunice from 1814. He worked here as a pastor. He composed his poems in a wood called Mlíč. It used to be on the place of present train stop. Several pieces of furniture were made from an oak under which Ján Hollý used to compose. However, some planks were saved and an altar was crafted from them. In the pastorate, there is Hollý's remembrance room. It is a part of the Slovak national culture heritage. After a large fire of Madunice, Ján Hollý left to Dobrá Voda.

=== Other ===
In 2003 on the Váh Canal, the World freshwater fishing championship took place. Thanks to flat terrain, recreational cycling can be performed. It is also possible to swim in former sand and gravel pits. In 1993, the book Madunice, 880th anniversary of first literal mention about the town from Karol Kabát was set out.
