= František Svrbický and Gizela Svrbická =

Jews rescuers Slovak couple recognized as Righteous Among the Nations

- Born: 2 April 1904 (František); 8 March 1907 (Gizela); Rišňovce, Austria-Hungary
- Died: 9 May 1979 (aged 75) (František); 10 January 1986 (aged 78) (Gizela); Czechoslovakia
- Known for: Rescue of Jews during the Holocaust
- Awards: Righteous Among the Nations (2017)

František Svrbický and Gizela Svrbická (records anglicize the name as "Svrbicki") were a Slovak couple recognized by Yad Vashem in 2017 as Righteous Among the Nations for their role in sheltering Jewish families during the Holocaust in Slovakia.

== Early life ==
František Svrbický was born on 2 April 1904, and Gizela Jarabková on 8 March 1907, both in the village of Rišňovce, Austria-Hungary (today in western Slovakia). The couple married in 1926 and ran a grocery store in their home village and later in Kľačany.

== Rescue during the Holocaust ==
During World War II, František and Gizela Svrbický assisted Jewish families fleeing persecution under the wartime Slovak regime. Among those they helped was the family of Fanny and Izidor Schlosser, their young son Harry, and Fanny's brother Herman Grünwald, who were hiding near Rišňovce in 1944.

The Svrbickýs provided shelter, food, and cover identities for several months. They initially hid the family in a concealed potato storage room beneath their grocery store. Later, as he got news that German forces were moving into the area, František Svrbický decided to relocate the family, digging a cavern with scythe and sickle with a "thick enough wall to stop a bayonet" as Schlosser recalls. The family remained concealed for four months, from December 1944 to April 1945, in extremely harsh conditions: total darkness, unable to speak or move, freezing due to the cold.

At great personal risk, they cared for the family through the winter until the area was liberated in 1945.

"The people who saved us were heroes. I would not be here without them."

— Herman Schlosser, Slovak Spectator, 2024

František also reportedly assisted other Jewish individuals by providing shelter in properties he had acquired from deported Jewish owners.

== Recognition ==
On 25 January 2017, František and Gizela Svrbický were posthumously recognized by the State of Israel as Righteous Among the Nations for their efforts to save Jews during the Holocaust.

== Death ==
František Svrbický died on 9 May 1979. Gizela Svrbická died on 10 January 1986.
