= Dvorníky =

- Municipality
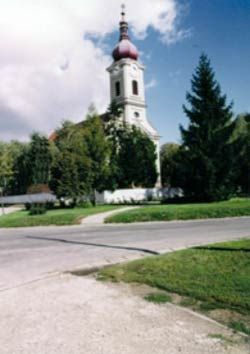

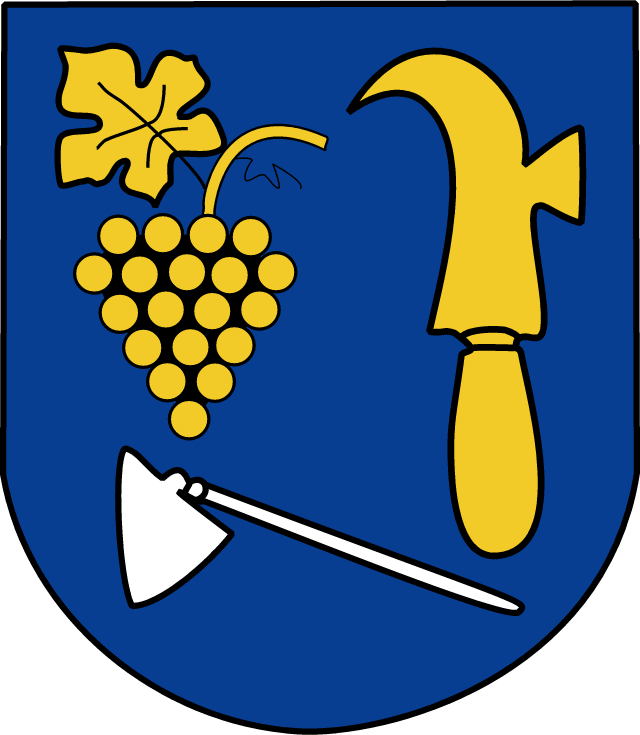
- Flag Coat of arms

- Location of Dvorníky in the Trnava Region Location of Dvorníky in Slovakia
- Coordinates: 48.35°N 17.78°E
- Country: Slovakia
- Region: Trnava Region
- District: Hlohovec District
- First mentioned: 1247

Area
  - Total: 25.53 km^{2} (9.86 sq mi)
- Elevation: 163 m (535 ft)

Population (2025)
  - Total: 1,952
- Time zone: UTC+1 (CET)
  - Summer (DST): UTC+2 (CEST)
- Postal code: 920 56
- Area code: +421 33
- Vehicle registration plate (until 2022): HC
- Website: dvorniky.sk

Dvorníky (Hungarian: Udvarnok) is a village and municipality in Hlohovec District in the Trnava Region of western Slovakia.

== History ==
In historical records the village was first mentioned in 1247.

== Geography ==
The municipality lies at an altitude of 163 metres (535 ft) and covers an area of 25.53 km^{2} (9.86 sq mi) (2025).

== Population ==
Population statistic (10 years)
Year	1995	2005	2015	2025
Count	1925	2021	2028	1952
Difference		+4.98%	+0.34%	−3.74%

Population statistic
Year	2024	2025
Count	1953	1952
Difference		−0.05%

It has a population of 1952 people (31 December 2025).

=== Ethnicity ===
Census 2021 (1+ %)
Ethnicity	Number	Fraction
Slovak	1936	95.55%
Not found out	70	3.45%
Total	2026	

In year 2021 was 2026 people by ethnicity 1936 as Slovak, 70 as Not found out, 13 as Czech, 12 as Hungarian, 6 as Other, 4 as Russian, 3 as Rusyn, 2 as Ukrainian, 2 as Romani, 2 as Albanian, 1 as Irish, 1 as Italian, 1 as Serbian, 1 as German, 1 as Canadian and 1 as Bulgarian.

Note on population: The difference values of population numbers in the table "Population statistic" and in the sections "Ethnicity" & "Religion" is caused by the use of various statistical methods.

=== Religion ===
Census 2021 (1+ %)
Religion	Number	Fraction
Roman Catholic Church	1534	75.72%
None	341	16.83%
Not found out	86	4.24%
Evangelical Church	26	1.28%
Total	2026	

In year 2021 was 2026 people by religion 1534 from Roman Catholic Church, 341 from None, 86 from Not found out, 26 from Evangelical Church, 11 from Greek Catholic Church, 9 from Christian Congregations in Slovakia, 6 from Ad hoc movements, 5 from Eastern Orthodox Church, 4 from Other, 2 from Islam, 1 from Calvinist Church and 1 from Paganism and natural spirituality.

== Genealogical resources ==
The records for genealogical research are available at the state archive "Statny Archiv in Bratislava, Slovakia"

- Roman Catholic church records (births/marriages/deaths): 1712-1895 (parish A)

== See also ==
- List of municipalities and towns in Slovakia
