= Ratkovce =

- Municipality
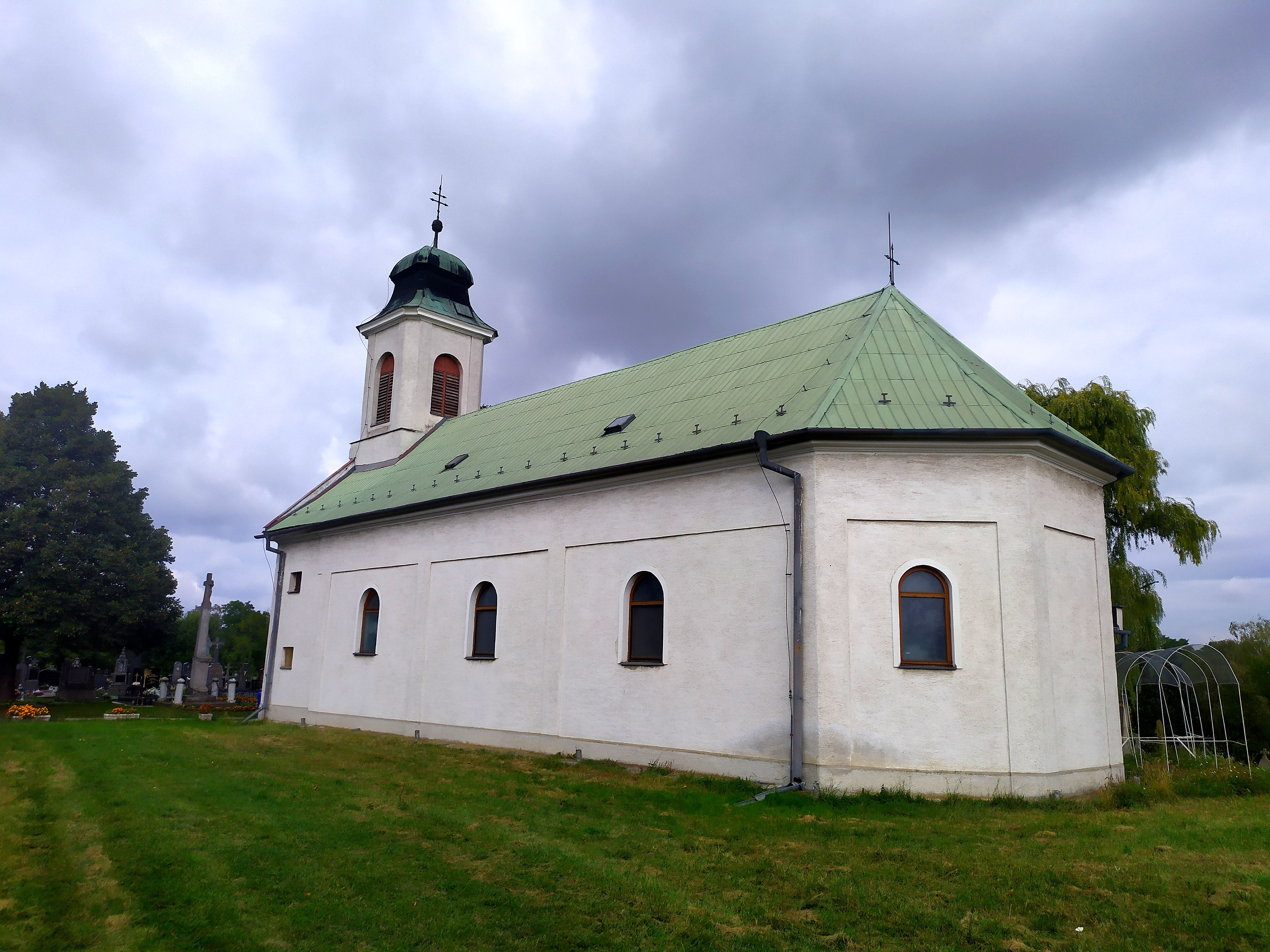

- Flag

- Location of Ratkovce in the Trnava Region Location of Ratkovce in Slovakia
- Coordinates: 48.47°N 17.72°E
- Country: Slovakia
- Region: Trnava Region
- District: Hlohovec District
- First mentioned: 1388

Area
  - Total: 4.45 km^{2} (1.72 sq mi)
- Elevation: 145 m (476 ft)

Population (2025)
  - Total: 365
- Time zone: UTC+1 (CET)
  - Summer (DST): UTC+2 (CEST)
- Postal code: 920 42
- Area code: +421 33
- Vehicle registration plate (until 2022): HC
- Website: www.ratkovce.sk

Ratkovce (Hungarian: Ratkóc) is a village and municipality in Hlohovec District in the Trnava Region of western Slovakia.

== History ==
In historical records the village was first mentioned in 1113.

== Geography ==
The municipality lies at an altitude of 145 metres (476 ft) and covers an area of 4.45 km^{2} (1.72 sq mi) (2025).

== Population ==
Population statistic (10 years)
Year	1995	2005	2015	2025
Count	303	289	327	365
Difference		−4.62%	+13.14%	+11.62%

Population statistic
Year	2024	2025
Count	362	365
Difference		+0.82%

It has a population of 365 people (31 December 2025).

=== Ethnicity ===
Census 2021 (1+ %)
Ethnicity	Number	Fraction
Slovak	340	97.14%
Not found out	4	1.14%
Total	350	

In year 2021 was 350 people by ethnicity 340 as Slovak, 4 as Not found out, 3 as Czech, 2 as Ukrainian, 2 as Hungarian, 1 as Italian, 1 as Rusyn and 1 as Albanian.

Note on population: The difference values of population numbers in the table "Population statistic" and in the sections "Ethnicity" & "Religion" is caused by the use of various statistical methods.

=== Religion ===
Census 2021 (1+ %)
Religion	Number	Fraction
Roman Catholic Church	270	77.14%
None	57	16.29%
Not found out	8	2.29%
Christian Congregations in Slovakia	7	2%
Total	350	

In year 2021 was 350 people by religion 270 from Roman Catholic Church, 57 from None, 8 from Not found out, 7 from Christian Congregations in Slovakia, 2 from Eastern Orthodox Church, 2 from Greek Catholic Church, 1 from Calvinist Church, 1 from Other and not ascertained christian church, 1 from Buddhism and 1 from Ad hoc movements.
