= Horné Trhovište =

- Municipality
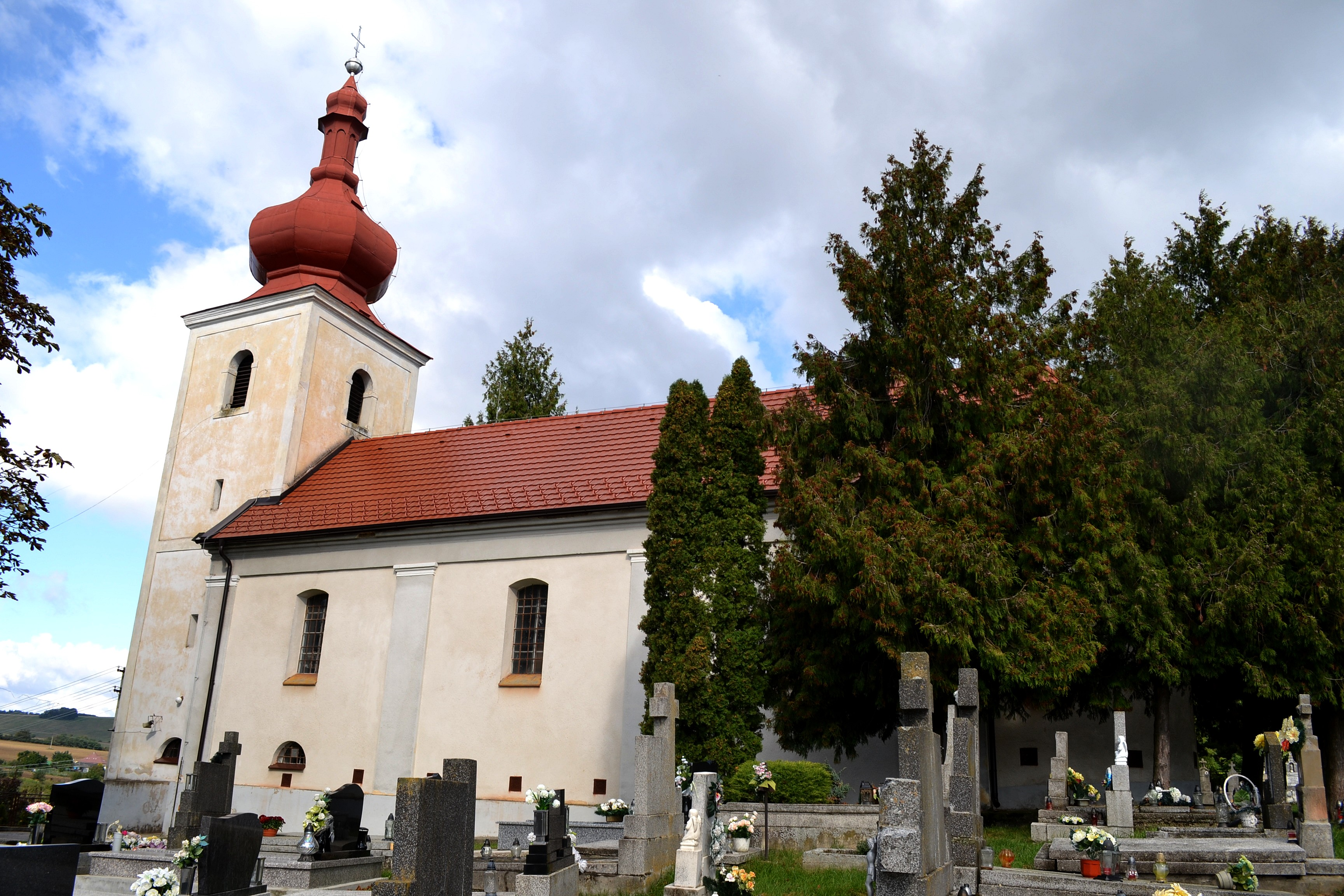
- Church in Horné Trhovište

- Flag

- Location of Horné Trhovište in the Trnava Region Location of Horné Trhovište in Slovakia
- Coordinates: 48.47°N 17.87°E
- Country: Slovakia
- Region: Trnava Region
- District: Hlohovec District
- First mentioned: 1332

Area
  - Total: 7.54 km^{2} (2.91 sq mi)
- Elevation: 211 m (692 ft)

Population (2025)
  - Total: 574
- Time zone: UTC+1 (CET)
  - Summer (DST): UTC+2 (CEST)
- Postal code: 920 66
- Area code: +421 33
- Vehicle registration plate (until 2022): HC
- Website: www.hornetrhoviste.sk

Horné Trhovište (Hungarian: Felsővásárd) is a village and municipality in Hlohovec District in the Trnava Region of western Slovakia.

== History ==
In historical records the village was first mentioned in 1332.

== Geography ==
The municipality lies at an altitude of 211 metres (692 ft) and covers an area of 7.54 km^{2} (2.91 sq mi) (2025).

== Population ==
Population statistic (10 years)
Year	1995	2005	2015	2025
Count	572	549	600	574
Difference		−4.02%	+9.28%	−4.33%

Population statistic
Year	2024	2025
Count	574	574
Difference		+0%

It has a population of 574 people (31 December 2025).

=== Ethnicity ===
Census 2021 (1+ %)
Ethnicity	Number	Fraction
Slovak	574	97.28%
Not found out	13	2.2%
Total	590	

In year 2021 was 590 people by ethnicity 574 as Slovak, 13 as Not found out, 2 as Czech, 2 as Hungarian, 1 as Serbian, 1 as Romani, 1 as Russian, 1 as Polish and 1 as Other.

Note on population: The difference values of population numbers in the table "Population statistic" and in the sections "Ethnicity" & "Religion" is caused by the use of various statistical methods.

=== Religion ===
Census 2021 (1+ %)
Religion	Number	Fraction
Roman Catholic Church	464	78.64%
None	92	15.59%
Not found out	13	2.2%
Evangelical Church	8	1.36%
Total	590	

In year 2021 was 590 people by religion 464 from Roman Catholic Church, 92 from None, 13 from Not found out, 8 from Evangelical Church, 5 from Greek Catholic Church, 3 from Ad hoc movements, 1 from Calvinist Church, 1 from Christian Congregations in Slovakia, 1 from Islam, 1 from Other and 1 from Buddhism.

== Genealogical resources ==
The records for genealogical research are available at the state archive "Statny Archiv in Bratislava, Nitra, Slovakia"

- Roman Catholic church records (births/marriages/deaths): 1719-1899 (parish A)

== See also ==
- List of municipalities and towns in Slovakia
