= Dolné Zelenice =

- Municipality
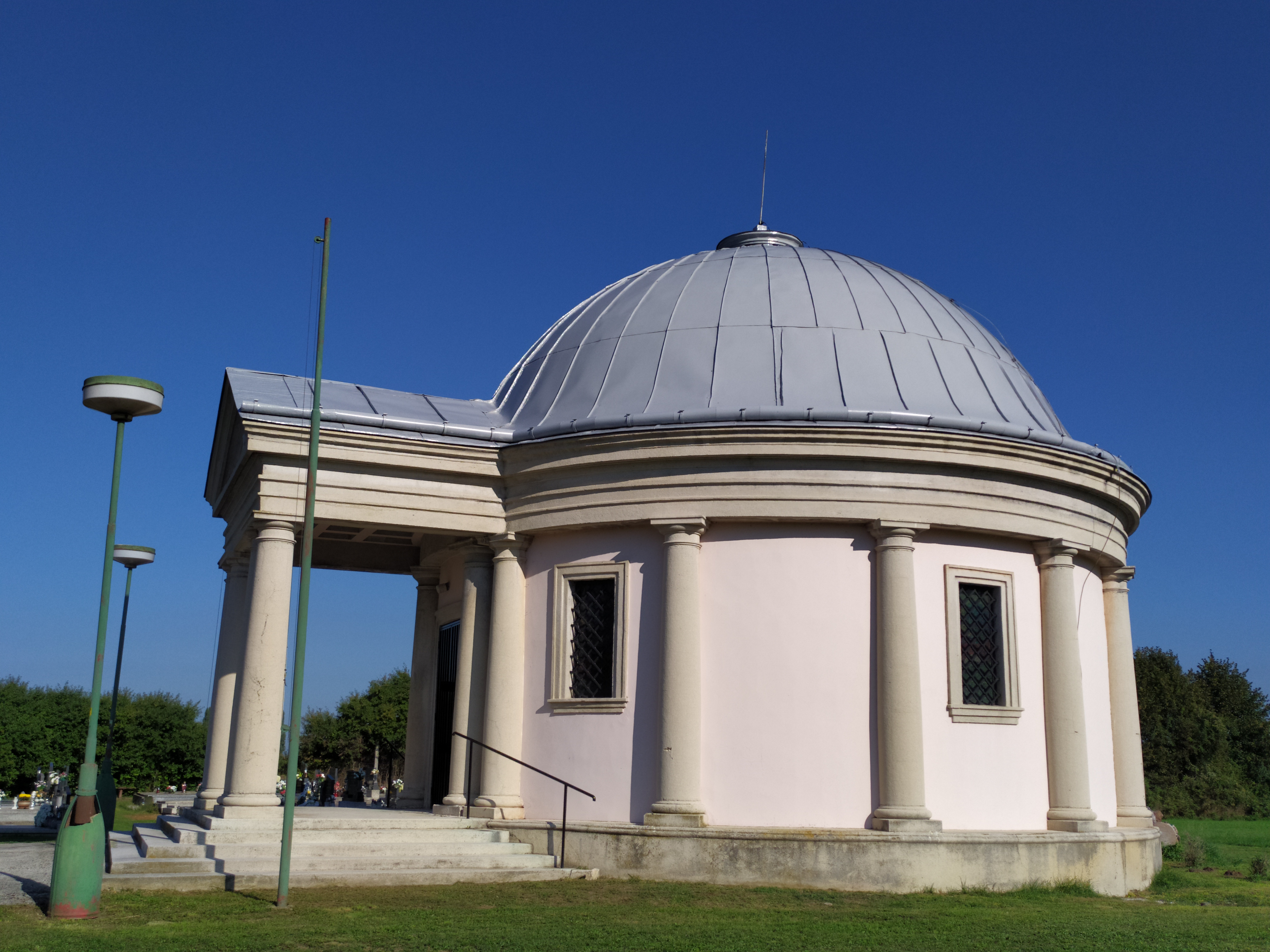

- Flag

- Location of Dolné Zelenice in the Trnava Region Location of Dolné Zelenice in Slovakia
- Coordinates: 48.38°N 17.75°E
- Country: Slovakia
- Region: Trnava Region
- District: Hlohovec District
- First mentioned: 1244

Area
  - Total: 2.71 km^{2} (1.05 sq mi)
- Elevation: 135 m (443 ft)

Population (2025)
  - Total: 615
- Time zone: UTC+1 (CET)
  - Summer (DST): UTC+2 (CEST)
- Postal code: 920 52
- Area code: +421 33
- Vehicle registration plate (until 2022): HC
- Website: www.dolnezelenice.sk

Dolné Zelenice (Hungarian: Alsózélle) is a village and municipality in Hlohovec District in the Trnava Region of western Slovakia.

== History ==
In historical records the village was first mentioned in 1244.

== Geography ==
The municipality lies at an altitude of 135 metres (443 ft) and covers an area of 2.71 km^{2} (1.05 sq mi) (2025).

== Population ==
Population statistic (10 years)
Year	1995	2005	2015	2025
Count	527	545	600	615
Difference		+3.41%	+10.09%	+2.5%

Population statistic
Year	2024	2025
Count	611	615
Difference		+0.65%

It has a population of 615 people (31 December 2025).

=== Ethnicity ===
Census 2021 (1+ %)
Ethnicity	Number	Fraction
Slovak	576	97.29%
Not found out	8	1.35%
Czech	6	1.01%
Total	592	

In year 2021 was 592 people by ethnicity 576 as Slovak, 8 as Not found out, 6 as Czech, 3 as Other, 2 as Ukrainian, 1 as Vietnamese, 1 as Serbian, 1 as Romani, 1 as Polish, 1 as German and 1 as French.

Note on population: The difference values of population numbers in the table "Population statistic" and in the sections "Ethnicity" & "Religion" is caused by the use of various statistical methods.

=== Religion ===
Census 2021 (1+ %)
Religion	Number	Fraction
Roman Catholic Church	410	69.26%
None	134	22.64%
Evangelical Church	18	3.04%
Not found out	10	1.69%
Total	592	

In year 2021 was 592 people by religion 410 from Roman Catholic Church, 134 from None, 18 from Evangelical Church, 10 from Not found out, 5 from Christian Congregations in Slovakia, 5 from United Methodist Church, 3 from Greek Catholic Church, 2 from Eastern Orthodox Church, 2 from Baptists Church, 1 from Paganism and natural spirituality, 1 from Islam and 1 from Other.

== Genealogical resources ==
The records for genealogical research are available at the state archive "Statny Archiv in Bratislava, Nitra, Slovakia"

- Roman Catholic church records (births/marriages/deaths): 1771-1911 (parish B)
- Lutheran church records (births/marriages/deaths): 1792-1928 (parish B)

== See also ==
- List of municipalities and towns in Slovakia
