= Žlkovce =

- Municipality
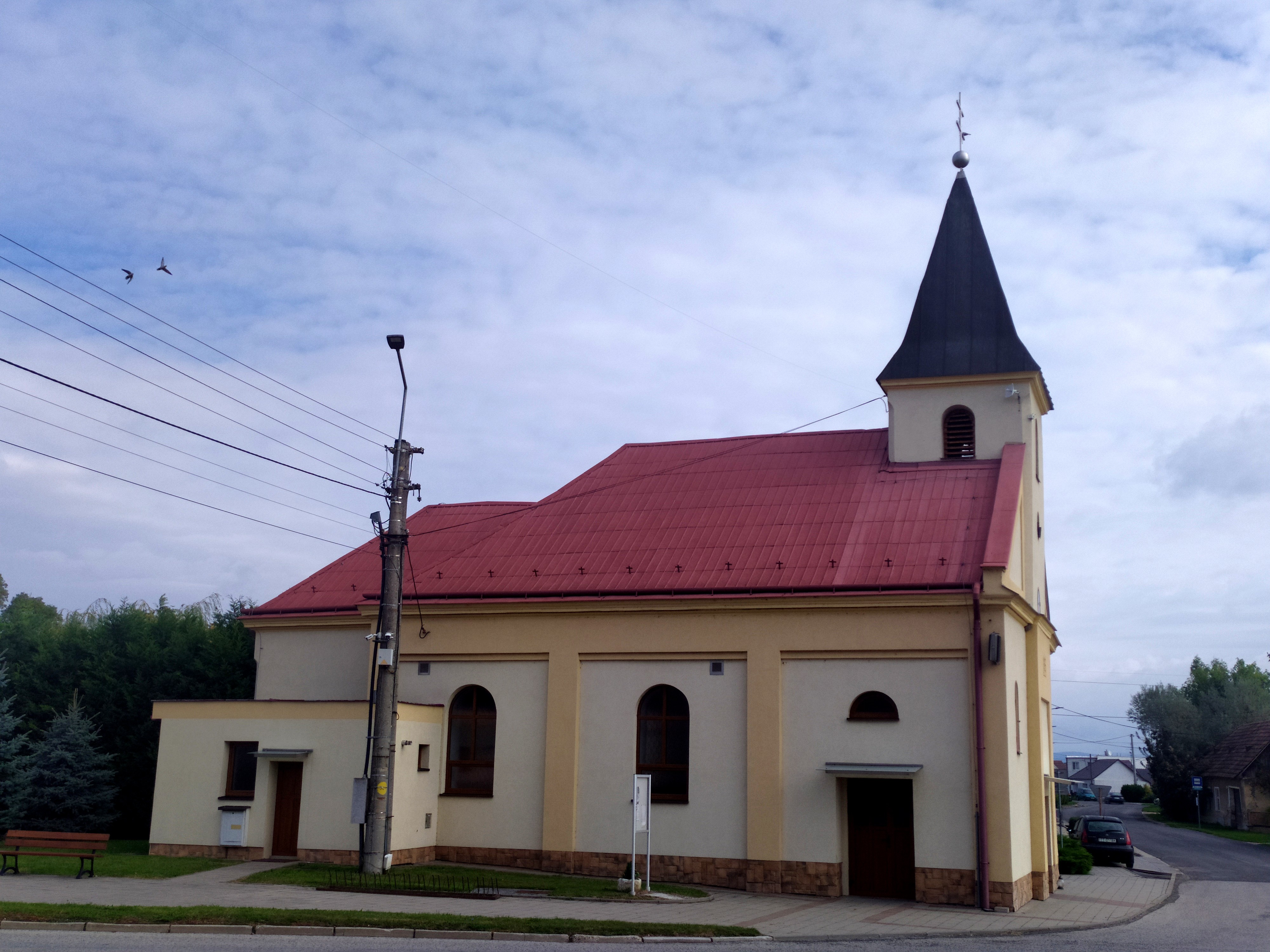

- Flag

- Location of Žlkovce in the Trnava Region Location of Žlkovce in Slovakia
- Coordinates: 48.47°N 17.72°E
- Country: Slovakia
- Region: Trnava Region
- District: Hlohovec District
- First mentioned: 1229

Area
  - Total: 7.93 km^{2} (3.06 sq mi)
- Elevation: 144 m (472 ft)

Population (2025)
  - Total: 626
- Time zone: UTC+1 (CET)
  - Summer (DST): UTC+2 (CEST)
- Postal code: 920 42
- Area code: +421 33
- Vehicle registration plate (until 2022): HC
- Website: www.zlkovce.sk

Žlkovce (Hungarian: Zsúk) is a village and municipality in Hlohovec District in the Trnava Region of western Slovakia.

== History ==
In historical records the village was first mentioned in 1229.

== Geography ==
The municipality lies at an altitude of 144 metres (472 ft) and covers an area of 7.93 km^{2} (3.06 sq mi) (2025).

== Population ==
Population statistic (10 years)
Year	1995	2005	2015	2025
Count	629	660	661	626
Difference		+4.92%	+0.15%	−5.29%

Population statistic
Year	2024	2025
Count	627	626
Difference		−0.15%

It has a population of 626 people (31 December 2025).

=== Ethnicity ===
Census 2021 (1+ %)
Ethnicity	Number	Fraction
Slovak	628	94.72%
Not found out	30	4.52%
Total	663	

In year 2021 was 663 people by ethnicity 628 as Slovak, 30 as Not found out, 6 as Czech, 4 as Italian, 4 as Other, 2 as Romani, 1 as Vietnamese, 1 as Russian and 1 as Austrian.

Note on population: The difference values of population numbers in the table "Population statistic" and in the sections "Ethnicity" & "Religion" is caused by the use of various statistical methods.

=== Religion ===
Census 2021 (1+ %)
Religion	Number	Fraction
Roman Catholic Church	525	79.19%
None	94	14.18%
Not found out	26	3.92%
Total	663	

In year 2021 was 663 people by religion 525 from Roman Catholic Church, 94 from None, 26 from Not found out, 5 from Christian Congregations in Slovakia, 3 from Islam, 3 from Evangelical Church, 2 from Greek Catholic Church, 1 from Calvinist Church, 1 from Eastern Orthodox Church, 1 from Other and not ascertained christian church, 1 from Other and 1 from Buddhism.
