= Bojničky =

- Municipality
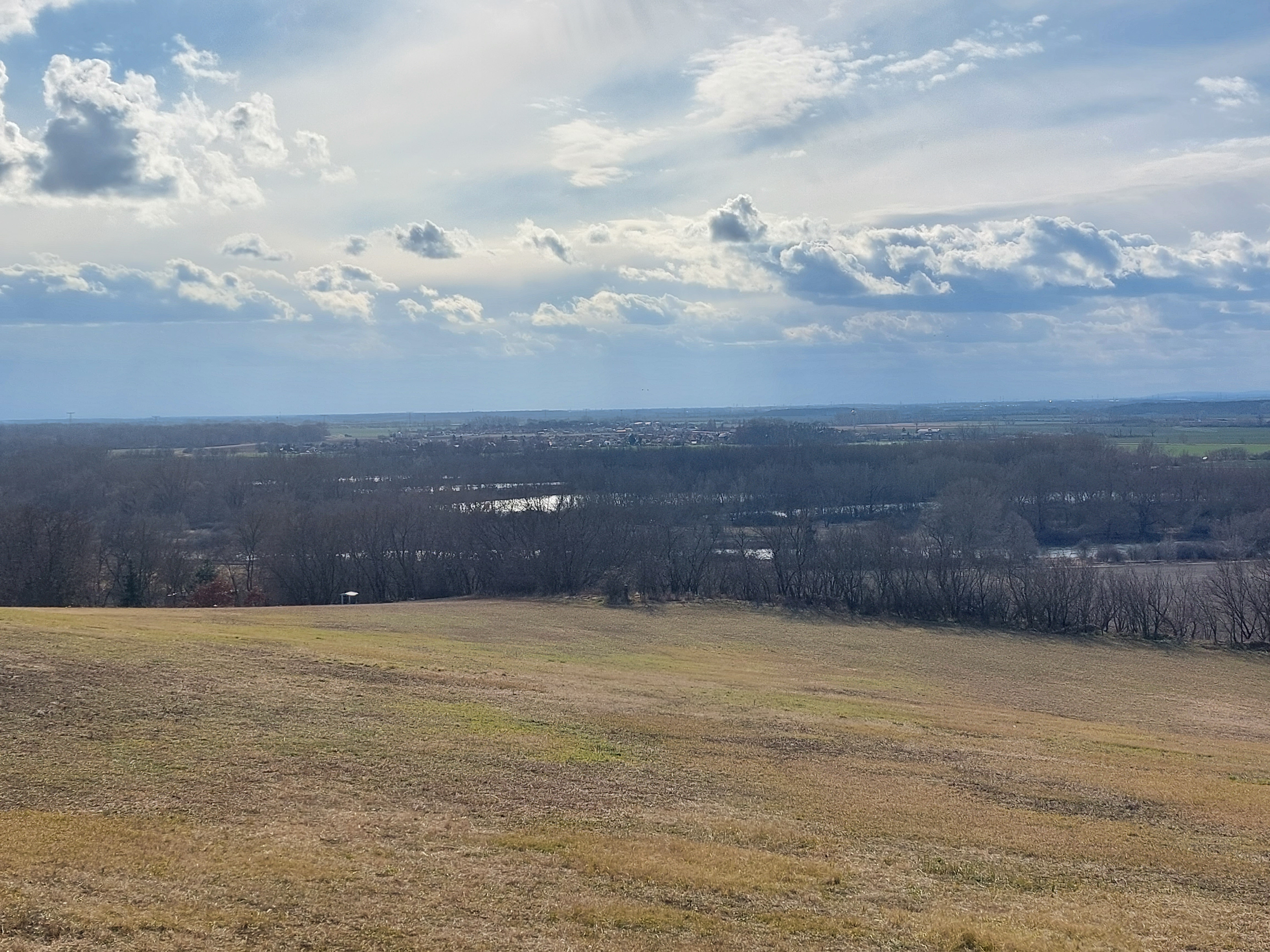

- Flag

- Location of Bojničky in the Trnava Region Location of Bojničky in Slovakia
- Coordinates: 48.40°N 17.80°E
- Country: Slovakia
- Region: Trnava Region
- District: Hlohovec District
- First mentioned: 1113

Area
  - Total: 9.26 km^{2} (3.58 sq mi)
- Elevation: 193 m (633 ft)

Population (2025)
  - Total: 1,441
- Time zone: UTC+1 (CET)
  - Summer (DST): UTC+2 (CEST)
- Postal code: 920 55
- Area code: +421 33
- Vehicle registration plate (until 2022): HC
- Website: www.bojnicky.sk/sk-sk/

Bojničky (Hungarian: Bajmócska) is a village and municipality in Hlohovec District in the Trnava Region of western Slovakia.

== History ==
In historical records the village was first mentioned in 1113.

Titanium oxide was independently rediscovered in 1795 by Prussian chemist Martin Heinrich Klaproth in rutile from Boinik (the German name of Bajmócska), a village in Hungary (now Bojničky in Slovakia). Klaproth found that it contained a new element and named it for the Titans of Greek mythology. After hearing about Gregor's earlier discovery, he obtained a sample of manaccanite and confirmed that it contained titanium.

== Geography ==
The municipality lies at an altitude of 193 metres (633 ft) and covers an area of 9.26 km^{2} (3.58 sq mi) (2025).

It is around a 10-minute car journey from the neighbouring town of Hlohovec and it is served by a regular bus route from Hlohovec. To give some context as to the proximity of Bojničky and Hlohovec, the elevated photo on the Wikipedia article of Hlohovec was taken from a viewpoint within walking distance from the edge of Bojničky along the road the connects Bojničky to Hlohovec.

Some people from Bojničky work in Hlohovec.

It is also possible to commute the 45 minute by car journey to Bratislava, the capital of Slovakia, from Bojničky.

As at December 2011, around 5 new houses were in the process of being built in Bojničky by individuals.

== Population ==
Population statistic (10 years)
Year	1995	2005	2015	2025
Count	1190	1323	1374	1441
Difference		+11.17%	+3.85%	+4.87%

Population statistic
Year	2024	2025
Count	1421	1441
Difference		+1.40%

It has a population of 1441 people (31 December 2025).

=== Ethnicity ===
Census 2021 (1+ %)
Ethnicity	Number	Fraction
Slovak	1395	98.17%
Not found out	28	1.97%
Total	1421	

In year 2021 was 1421 people by ethnicity 1395 as Slovak, 28 as Not found out, 9 as Czech, 5 as Rusyn, 3 as Other, 2 as Hungarian, 1 as Italian, 1 as Russian, 1 as Romanian, 1 as Polish, 1 as German and 1 as English.

Note on population: The difference values of population numbers in the table "Population statistic" and in the sections "Ethnicity" & "Religion" is caused by the use of various statistical methods.

=== Religion ===
Census 2021 (1+ %)
Religion	Number	Fraction
Roman Catholic Church	1106	77.83%
None	236	16.61%
Not found out	38	2.67%
Total	1421	

In year 2021 was 1421 people by religion 1106 from Roman Catholic Church, 236 from None, 38 from Not found out, 13 from Christian Congregations in Slovakia, 8 from Evangelical Church, 6 from Eastern Orthodox Church, 6 from Ad hoc movements, 2 from Other, 2 from Greek Catholic Church, 1 from Jewish community, 1 from Calvinist Church, 1 from Jehovah's Witnesses and 1 from Buddhism.

== Genealogical resources ==
The records for genealogical research are available at the state archive "Statny Archiv in Bratislava, Slovakia"

- Roman Catholic church records (births/marriages/deaths): 1712-1895 (parish B)

== See also ==
- List of municipalities and towns in Slovakia
