= Dolné Trhovište =

- Municipality
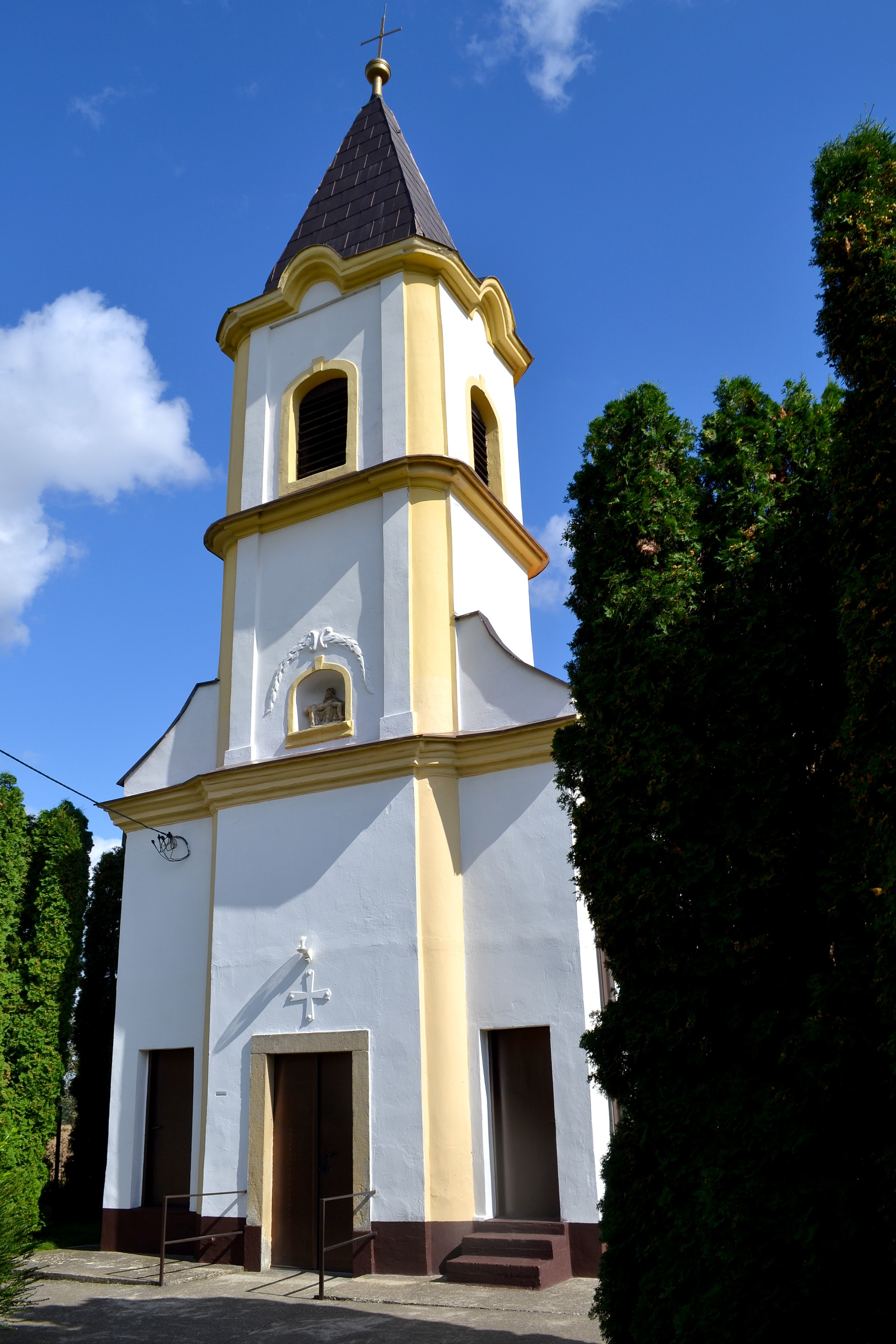
- Church in Dolné Trhovište

- Flag

- Location of Dolné Trhovište in the Trnava Region Location of Dolné Trhovište in Slovakia
- Coordinates: 48.44°N 17.90°E
- Country: Slovakia
- Region: Trnava Region
- District: Hlohovec District
- First mentioned: 1156

Area
  - Total: 10.05 km^{2} (3.88 sq mi)
- Elevation: 185 m (607 ft)

Population (2025)
  - Total: 572
- Time zone: UTC+1 (CET)
  - Summer (DST): UTC+2 (CEST)
- Postal code: 920 61
- Area code: +421 33
- Vehicle registration plate (until 2022): HC
- Website: www.dolnetrhoviste.sk

Dolné Trhovište (Hungarian: Alsóvásárd) is a village and municipality in Hlohovec District in the Trnava Region of western Slovakia.

== History ==
In historical records the village was first mentioned in 1156.

== Geography ==
The municipality lies at an altitude of 185 metres (607 ft) and covers an area of 10.05 km^{2} (3.88 sq mi) (2025).

== Population ==
Population statistic (10 years)
Year	1995	2005	2015	2025
Count	632	619	659	572
Difference		−2.05%	+6.46%	−13.20%

Population statistic
Year	2024	2025
Count	571	572
Difference		+0.17%

It has a population of 572 people (31 December 2025).

=== Ethnicity ===
Census 2021 (1+ %)
Ethnicity	Number	Fraction
Slovak	597	97.86%
Not found out	10	1.63%
Total	610	

In year 2021 was 610 people by ethnicity 597 as Slovak, 10 as Not found out, 5 as Czech, 3 as Rusyn, 2 as Other, 1 as Russian, 1 as Polish, 1 as Moravian and 1 as Hungarian.

Note on population: The difference values of population numbers in the table "Population statistic" and in the sections "Ethnicity" & "Religion" is caused by the use of various statistical methods.

=== Religion ===
Census 2021 (1+ %)
Religion	Number	Fraction
Roman Catholic Church	469	76.89%
None	94	15.41%
Evangelical Church	18	2.95%
Not found out	15	2.46%
Greek Catholic Church	8	1.31%
Total	610	

In year 2021 was 610 people by religion 469 from Roman Catholic Church, 94 from None, 18 from Evangelical Church, 15 from Not found out, 8 from Greek Catholic Church, 2 from Calvinist Church, 1 from Eastern Orthodox Church, 1 from Christian Congregations in Slovakia, 1 from Other and 1 from Ad hoc movements.

== Genealogical resources ==
The records for genealogical research are available at the state archive "Statny Archiv in Bratislava, Nitra, Slovakia"

- Roman Catholic church records (births/marriages/deaths): 1719-1920 (parish B)

== See also ==
- List of municipalities and towns in Slovakia
