= Tepličky =

- Municipality
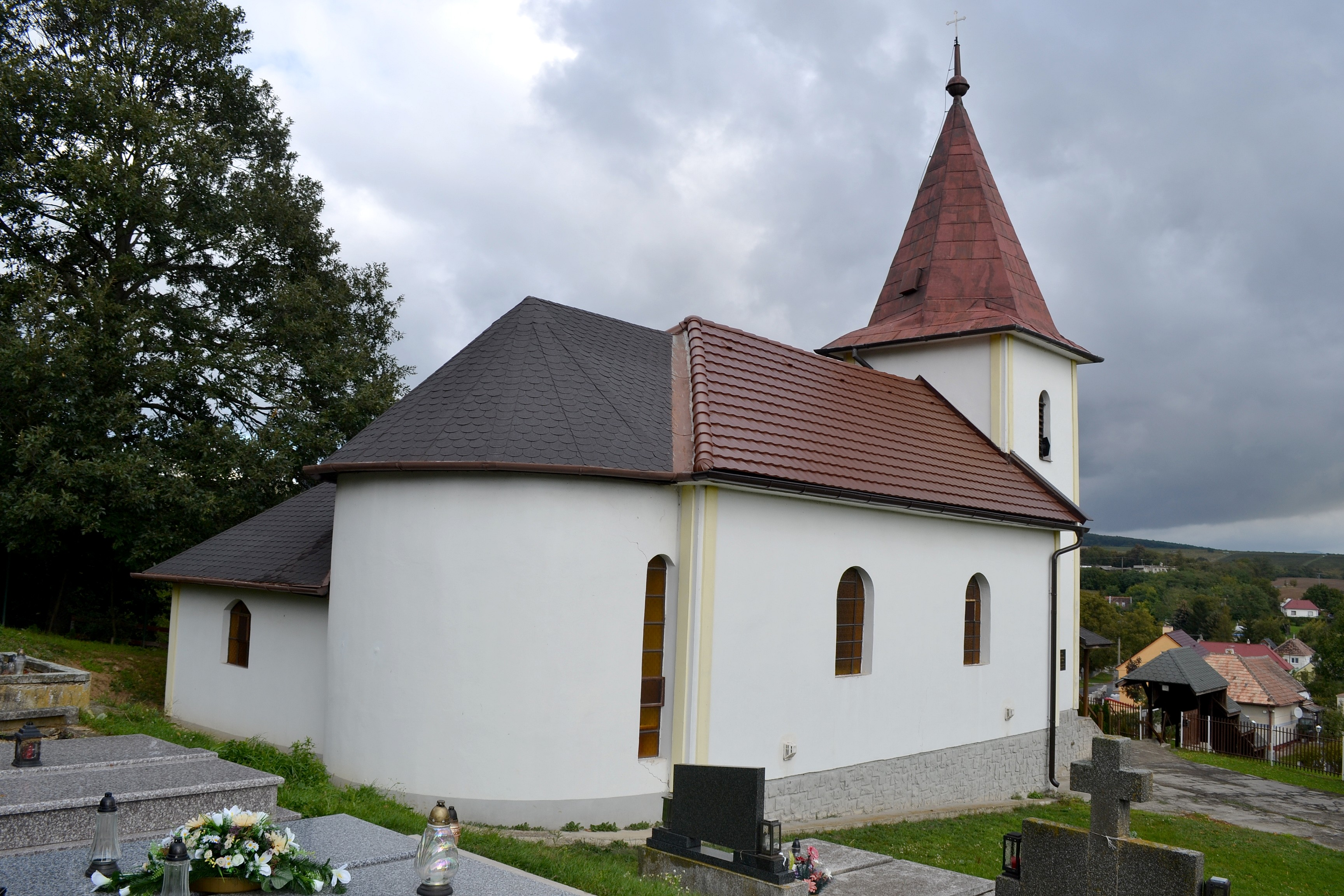

- Flag

- Location of Tepličky in the Trnava Region Location of Tepličky in Slovakia
- Coordinates: 48.47°N 17.85°E
- Country: Slovakia
- Region: Trnava Region
- District: Hlohovec District
- First mentioned: 1113

Area
  - Total: 5.67 km^{2} (2.19 sq mi)
- Elevation: 217 m (712 ft)

Population (2025)
  - Total: 319
- Time zone: UTC+1 (CET)
  - Summer (DST): UTC+2 (CEST)
- Postal code: 920 62
- Area code: +421 33
- Vehicle registration plate (until 2022): HC
- Website: teplicky.sk

Tepličky (Hungarian: Fornószeg) is a village and municipality in Hlohovec District in the Trnava Region of western Slovakia.

== History ==
In historical records the village was first mentioned in 1113.

== Geography ==
The municipality lies at an altitude of 217 metres (712 ft) and covers an area of 5.67 km^{2} (2.19 sq mi) (2025).

== Population ==
Population statistic (10 years)
Year	1995	2005	2015	2025
Count	268	283	320	319
Difference		+5.59%	+13.07%	−0.31%

Population statistic
Year	2024	2025
Count	317	319
Difference		+0.63%

It has a population of 319 people (31 December 2025).

=== Ethnicity ===
Census 2021 (1+ %)
Ethnicity	Number	Fraction
Slovak	273	91.3%
Not found out	25	8.36%
Other	3	1%
Total	299	

In year 2021 was 299 people by ethnicity 273 as Slovak, 25 as Not found out, 3 as Other and 1 as Polish.

Note on population: The difference values of population numbers in the table "Population statistic" and in the sections "Ethnicity" & "Religion" is caused by the use of various statistical methods.

=== Religion ===
Census 2021 (1+ %)
Religion	Number	Fraction
Roman Catholic Church	208	69.57%
None	56	18.73%
Not found out	25	8.36%
Greek Catholic Church	3	1%
Total	299	

In year 2021 was 299 people by religion 208 from Roman Catholic Church, 56 from None, 25 from Not found out, 3 from Greek Catholic Church, 2 from Evangelical Church, 2 from Buddhism, 1 from Other, 1 from Apostolic Church and 1 from Ad hoc movements.
