= Horné Otrokovce =

- Municipality
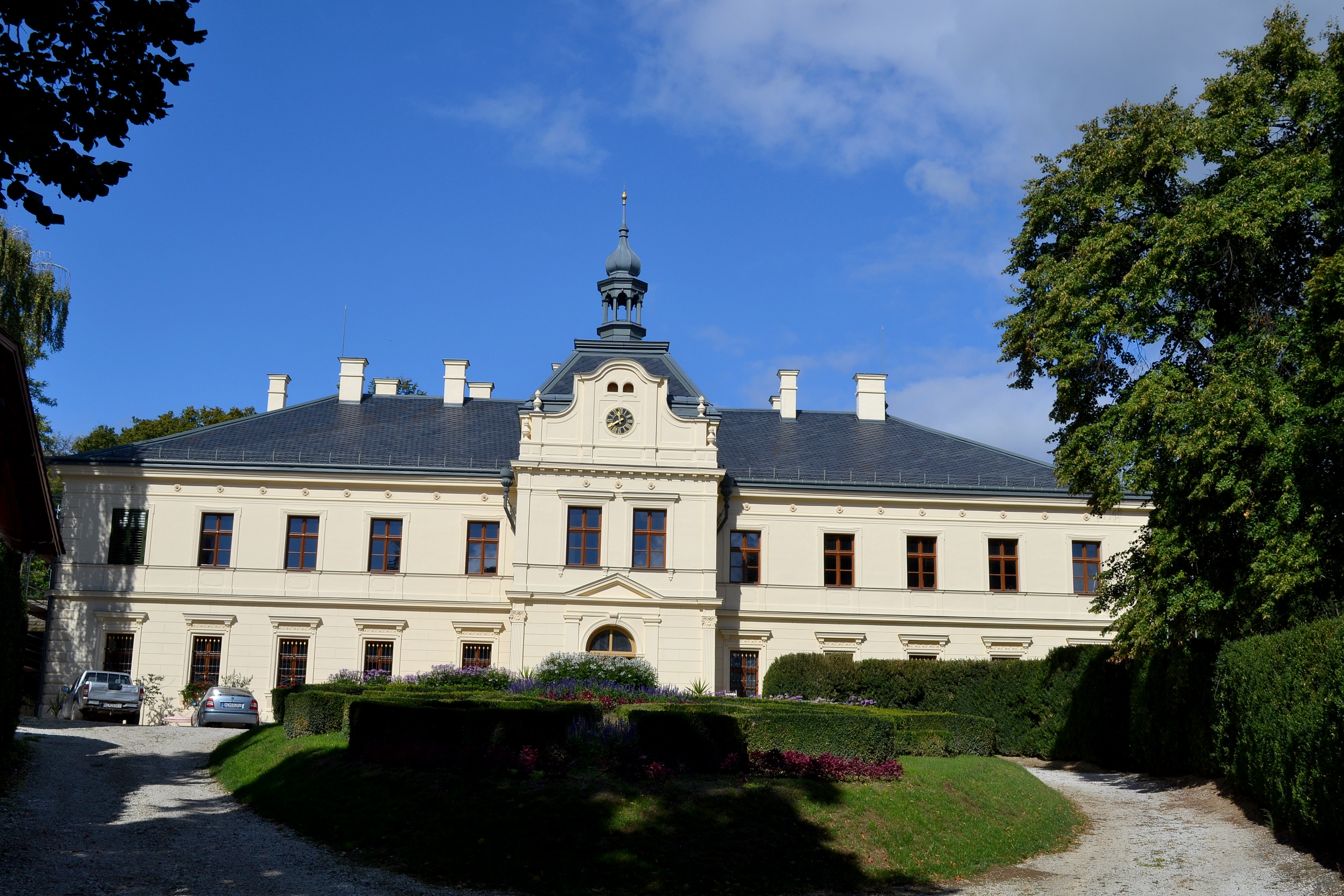
- Horné Otrokovce kaštieľ

- Flag

- Location of Horné Otrokovce in the Trnava Region Location of Horné Otrokovce in Slovakia
- Coordinates: 48.50°N 17.88°E
- Country: Slovakia
- Region: Trnava Region
- District: Hlohovec District
- First mentioned: 1113

Area
  - Total: 9.05 km^{2} (3.49 sq mi)
- Elevation: 208 m (682 ft)

Population (2025)
  - Total: 907
- Time zone: UTC+1 (CET)
  - Summer (DST): UTC+2 (CEST)
- Postal code: 920 62
- Area code: +421 33
- Vehicle registration plate (until 2022): HC
- Website: www.horneotrokovce.eu

Horné Otrokovce (Hungarian: Felsőatrak) is a village and municipality in Hlohovec District in the Trnava Region of western Slovakia.

== History ==
In historical records the village was first mentioned in 1113.

== Geography ==
The municipality lies at an altitude of 208 metres (682 ft) and covers an area of 9.05 km^{2} (3.49 sq mi) (2025).

== Population ==
Population statistic (10 years)
Year	1995	2005	2015	2025
Count	908	891	870	907
Difference		−1.87%	−2.35%	+4.25%

Population statistic
Year	2024	2025
Count	893	907
Difference		+1.56%

It has a population of 907 people (31 December 2025).

=== Ethnicity ===
Census 2021 (1+ %)
Ethnicity	Number	Fraction
Slovak	854	98.27%
Total	869	

In year 2021 was 869 people by ethnicity 854 as Slovak, 8 as Not found out, 3 as Hungarian, 2 as Czech, 2 as Ukrainian, 2 as Romani, 2 as Russian, 1 as Rusyn, 1 as German and 1 as Croatian.

Note on population: The difference values of population numbers in the table "Population statistic" and in the sections "Ethnicity" & "Religion" is caused by the use of various statistical methods.

=== Religion ===
Census 2021 (1+ %)
Religion	Number	Fraction
Roman Catholic Church	703	80.9%
None	133	15.3%
Not found out	9	1.04%
Total	869	

In year 2021 was 869 people by religion 703 from Roman Catholic Church, 133 from None, 9 from Not found out, 5 from Christian Congregations in Slovakia, 4 from Greek Catholic Church, 4 from Evangelical Church, 3 from Other and not ascertained christian church, 2 from Jehovah's Witnesses, 1 from Jewish community, 1 from Eastern Orthodox Church, 1 from Islam, 1 from Other, 1 from Buddhism and 1 from Ad hoc movements.

== Genealogical resources ==
The records for genealogical research are available at the state archive "Statny Archiv in Bratislava, Nitra, Slovakia"

- Roman Catholic church records (births/marriages/deaths): 1719-1902 (parish A)
- Lutheran church records (births/marriages/deaths): 1783-1919 (parish B)

== See also ==
- List of municipalities and towns in Slovakia
