= Leopoldov =

- Municipality
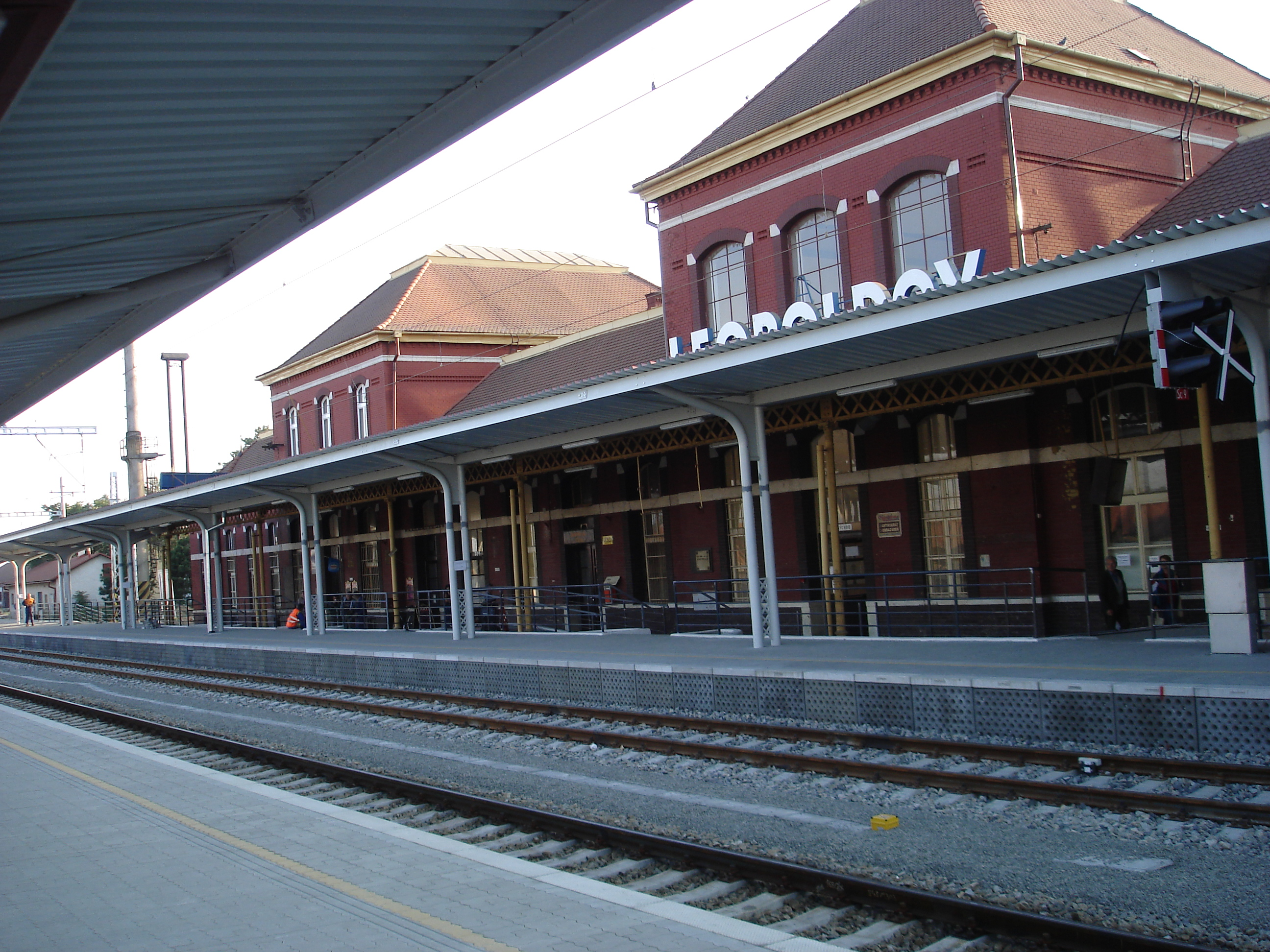

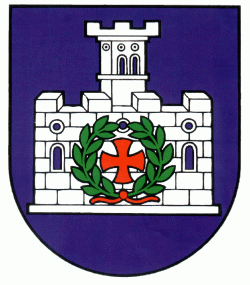
- Flag Coat of arms

- Location of Leopoldov in the Trnava Region Location of Leopoldov in Slovakia
- Coordinates: 48.44°N 17.77°E
- Country: Slovakia
- Region: Trnava Region
- District: Hlohovec District
- First mentioned: 1664

Government
  - Mayor: Tereza Kavuliaková

Area
  - Total: 5.65 km^{2} (2.18 sq mi)
- Elevation: 142 m (466 ft)

Population (2025)
  - Total: 3,850
- Time zone: UTC+1 (CET)
  - Summer (DST): UTC+2 (CEST)
- Postal code: 920 41
- Area code: +421 33
- Vehicle registration plate (until 2022): HC
- Website: www.leopoldov.sk

Leopoldov (before 1948 Mestečko; German: Leopold-Neustadtl; Hungarian: Újvároska) is a town in the Trnava Region of Slovakia, near the Váh river. It has a population of around 4,000 inhabitants. The city is the location of Leopoldov Prison, a high-security correctional institution.

== Geography ==
The municipality lies at an altitude of 142 metres (466 ft) and covers an area of 5.65 km^{2} (2.18 sq mi) (2025).

== History ==
The town was founded in 1664-1669 as a fortress against the Ottoman Turks on the initiative of Emperor Leopold I (hence the name). It was granted town status in 1669. The fortress has served as a state prison since 1855. A village called "Leopold" (German also: Leopoldstadt, Hungarian since 1873: Lipótvár) was made part of Leopoldov in 1882. In modern Slovakia, Leopoldov is an important transfer point of railway tracks.

Leopoldov was founded on fields of old villages of Červeník (former 'Verešvár') and Šulekovo (former Beregsek).

== Population ==
Population statistic (10 years)
Year	1995	2005	2015	2025
Count	4004	4083	4160	3850
Difference		+1.97%	+1.88%	−7.45%

Population statistic
Year	2024	2025
Count	3873	3850
Difference		−0.59%

It has a population of 3850 people (31 December 2025).

=== Ethnicity ===
Census 2021 (1+ %)
Ethnicity	Number	Fraction
Slovak	3799	95.62%
Not found out	157	3.95%
Total	3973	

In year 2021 was 3973 people by ethnicity 3799 as Slovak, 157 as Not found out, 23 as Czech, 12 as Hungarian, 9 as Other, 7 as Russian, 5 as Romani, 4 as Rusyn, 4 as German, 1 as Romanian and 1 as Moravian.

Note on population: The difference values of population numbers in the table "Population statistic" and in the sections "Ethnicity" & "Religion" is caused by the use of various statistical methods.

=== Religion ===
Census 2021 (1+ %)
Religion	Number	Fraction
Roman Catholic Church	2621	65.97%
None	973	24.49%
Not found out	192	4.83%
Evangelical Church	78	1.96%
Total	3973	

In year 2021 was 3973 people by religion 2621 from Roman Catholic Church, 973 from None, 192 from Not found out, 78 from Evangelical Church, 24 from Other, 18 from Ad hoc movements, 15 from Greek Catholic Church, 13 from Other and not ascertained christian church, 9 from Christian Congregations in Slovakia, 8 from Buddhism, 6 from Jehovah's Witnesses, 5 from Paganism and natural spirituality, 4 from Eastern Orthodox Church, 2 from Islam, 2 from Seventh-day Adventist Church, 1 from Calvinist Church, 1 from United Methodist Church and 1 from Apostolic Church.

== Partner towns ==
- Kuřim, Czech Republic
- Fertőszentmiklós, Hungary

== Gallery ==

The railway station in Leopoldov.

Pillory on the Square of Ignatius of Loyola in Leopoldov.
