= Siladice =

- Municipality
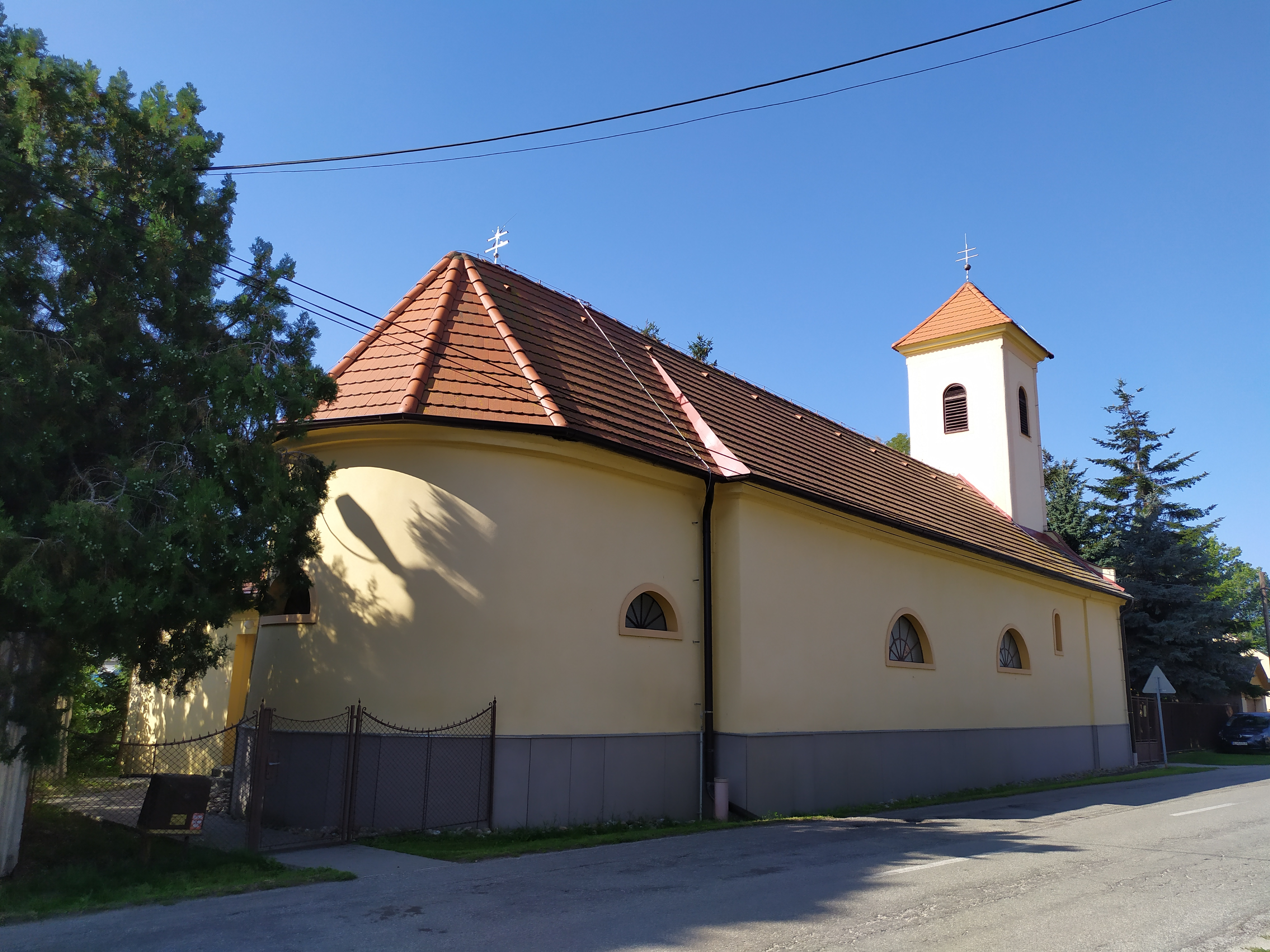

- Flag

- Location of Siladice in the Trnava Region Location of Siladice in Slovakia
- Coordinates: 48.37°N 17.75°E
- Country: Slovakia
- Region: Trnava Region
- District: Hlohovec District
- First mentioned: 1113

Area
  - Total: 7.60 km^{2} (2.93 sq mi)
- Elevation: 134 m (440 ft)

Population (2025)
  - Total: 638
- Time zone: UTC+1 (CET)
  - Summer (DST): UTC+2 (CEST)
- Postal code: 920 52
- Area code: +421 33
- Vehicle registration plate (until 2022): HC
- Website: www.siladice.sk

Siladice (Hungarian: Szilád) is a village and municipality in Hlohovec District in the Trnava Region of western Slovakia.

== History ==
In historical records the village was first mentioned in 1113.

== Geography ==
The municipality lies at an altitude of 134 metres (440 ft) and covers an area of 7.60 km^{2} (2.93 sq mi) (2025).

== Population ==
Population statistic (10 years)
Year	1995	2005	2015	2025
Count	630	630	663	638
Difference		+0%	+5.23%	−3.77%

Population statistic
Year	2024	2025
Count	647	638
Difference		−1.39%

It has a population of 638 people (31 December 2025).

=== Ethnicity ===
Census 2021 (1+ %)
Ethnicity	Number	Fraction
Slovak	652	96.87%
Not found out	19	2.82%
Total	673	

In year 2021 was 673 people by ethnicity 652 as Slovak, 19 as Not found out, 5 as Romani, 4 as Czech, 3 as Polish, 1 as Jewish, 1 as Russian, 1 as Romanian and 1 as Other.

Note on population: The difference values of population numbers in the table "Population statistic" and in the sections "Ethnicity" & "Religion" is caused by the use of various statistical methods.

=== Religion ===
Census 2021 (1+ %)
Religion	Number	Fraction
Roman Catholic Church	397	58.99%
None	128	19.02%
Evangelical Church	115	17.09%
Not found out	18	2.67%
Total	673	

In year 2021 was 673 people by religion 397 from Roman Catholic Church, 128 from None, 115 from Evangelical Church, 18 from Not found out, 5 from Ad hoc movements, 4 from Greek Catholic Church, 2 from Buddhism, 1 from Paganism and natural spirituality, 1 from Jehovah's Witnesses, 1 from Christian Congregations in Slovakia and 1 from Other.
