= Tekolďany =

- Municipality
- Flag

- Location of Tekolďany in the Trnava Region Location of Tekolďany in Slovakia
- Coordinates: 48.50°N 17.90°E
- Country: Slovakia
- Region: Trnava Region
- District: Hlohovec District
- First mentioned: 1310

Area
  - Total: 2.59 km^{2} (1.00 sq mi)
- Elevation: 203 m (666 ft)

Population (2025)
  - Total: 116
- Time zone: UTC+1 (CET)
  - Summer (DST): UTC+2 (CEST)
- Postal code: 920 62
- Area code: +421 33
- Vehicle registration plate (until 2022): HC
- Website: www.tekoldany.sk

Tekolďany (Hungarian: Tököld) is a village and municipality in Hlohovec District in the Trnava Region of western Slovakia.

== History ==
In historical records the village was first mentioned in 1310.

== Geography ==
The municipality lies at an altitude of 203 metres (666 ft) and covers an area of 2.59 km^{2} (1.00 sq mi) (2025).

== Population ==
Population statistic (10 years)
Year	1995	2005	2015	2025
Count	177	156	139	116
Difference		−11.86%	−10.89%	−16.54%

Population statistic
Year	2024	2025
Count	118	116
Difference		−1.69%

It has a population of 116 people (31 December 2025).

=== Ethnicity ===
Census 2021 (1+ %)
Ethnicity	Number	Fraction
Slovak	125	94.69%
Not found out	7	5.3%
Total	132	

In year 2021 was 132 people by ethnicity 125 as Slovak, 7 as Not found out, 1 as Czech and 1 as Russian.

Note on population: The difference values of population numbers in the table "Population statistic" and in the sections "Ethnicity" & "Religion" is caused by the use of various statistical methods.

=== Religion ===
Census 2021 (1+ %)
Religion	Number	Fraction
Roman Catholic Church	111	84.09%
None	11	8.33%
Not found out	7	5.3%
Total	132	

In year 2021 was 132 people by religion 111 from Roman Catholic Church, 11 from None, 7 from Not found out, 1 from Eastern Orthodox Church, 1 from Greek Catholic Church and 1 from Evangelical Church.
