= Sasinkovo =

- Municipality
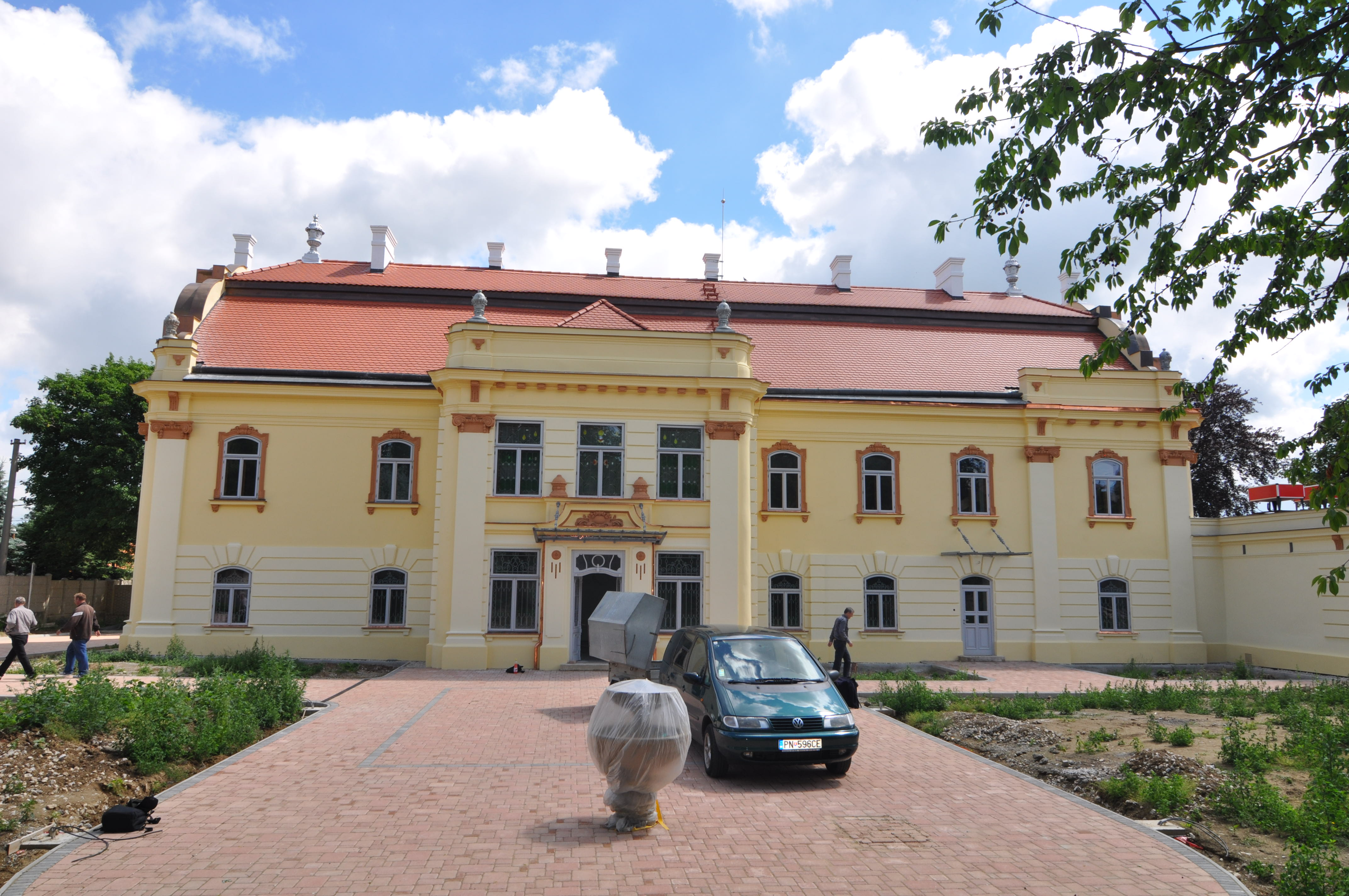

- Flag

- Location of Sasinkovo in the Trnava Region Location of Sasinkovo in Slovakia
- Coordinates: 48.38°N 17.85°E
- Country: Slovakia
- Region: Trnava Region
- District: Hlohovec District
- First mentioned: 1256

Area
  - Total: 12.41 km^{2} (4.79 sq mi)
- Elevation: 195 m (640 ft)

Population (2025)
  - Total: 801
- Time zone: UTC+1 (CET)
  - Summer (DST): UTC+2 (CEST)
- Postal code: 920 65
- Area code: +421 33
- Vehicle registration plate (until 2022): HC
- Website: www.sasinkovo.sk

Sasinkovo (Hungarian: Ság) is a village and municipality in Hlohovec District in the Trnava Region of western Slovakia.

== History ==
In historical records the village was first mentioned in 1256.

== Geography ==
The municipality lies at an altitude of 195 metres (640 ft) and covers an area of 12.41 km^{2} (4.79 sq mi) (2025).

== Population ==
Population statistic (10 years)
| Year | 1995 | 2005 | 2015 | 2025 |
|---|---|---|---|---|
| Count | 906 | 873 | 865 | 801 |
| Difference | | −3.64% | −0.91% | −7.39% |

Population statistic
| Year | 2024 | 2025 |
|---|---|---|
| Count | 813 | 801 |
| Difference | | −1.47% |

It has a population of 801 people (31 December 2025).

=== Ethnicity ===
Census 2021 (1+ %)
| Ethnicity | Number | Fraction |
|---|---|---|
| Slovak | 802 | 95.24% |
| Not found out | 43 | 5.1% |
| Total | 842 | |

In year 2021 was 842 people by ethnicity 802 as Slovak, 43 as Not found out, 4 as Czech, 1 as Rusyn, 1 as Hungarian and 1 as Bulgarian.

Note on population: The difference values of population numbers in the table "Population statistic" and in the sections "Ethnicity" & "Religion" is caused by the use of various statistical methods.

=== Religion ===
Census 2021 (1+ %)
| Religion | Number | Fraction |
|---|---|---|
| Roman Catholic Church | 468 | 55.58% |
| Evangelical Church | 200 | 23.75% |
| None | 107 | 12.71% |
| Not found out | 44 | 5.23% |
| Apostolic Church | 9 | 1.07% |
| Total | 842 | |

In year 2021 was 842 people by religion 468 from Roman Catholic Church, 200 from Evangelical Church, 107 from None, 44 from Not found out, 9 from Apostolic Church, 4 from Greek Catholic Church, 4 from Ad hoc movements, 2 from Paganism and natural spirituality, 1 from Islam, 1 from Other, 1 from Seventh-day Adventist Church and 1 from Buddhism.
