= Hlohovec District =

Coordinates: 48°25′N 17°45′E

Hlovovec District
- District
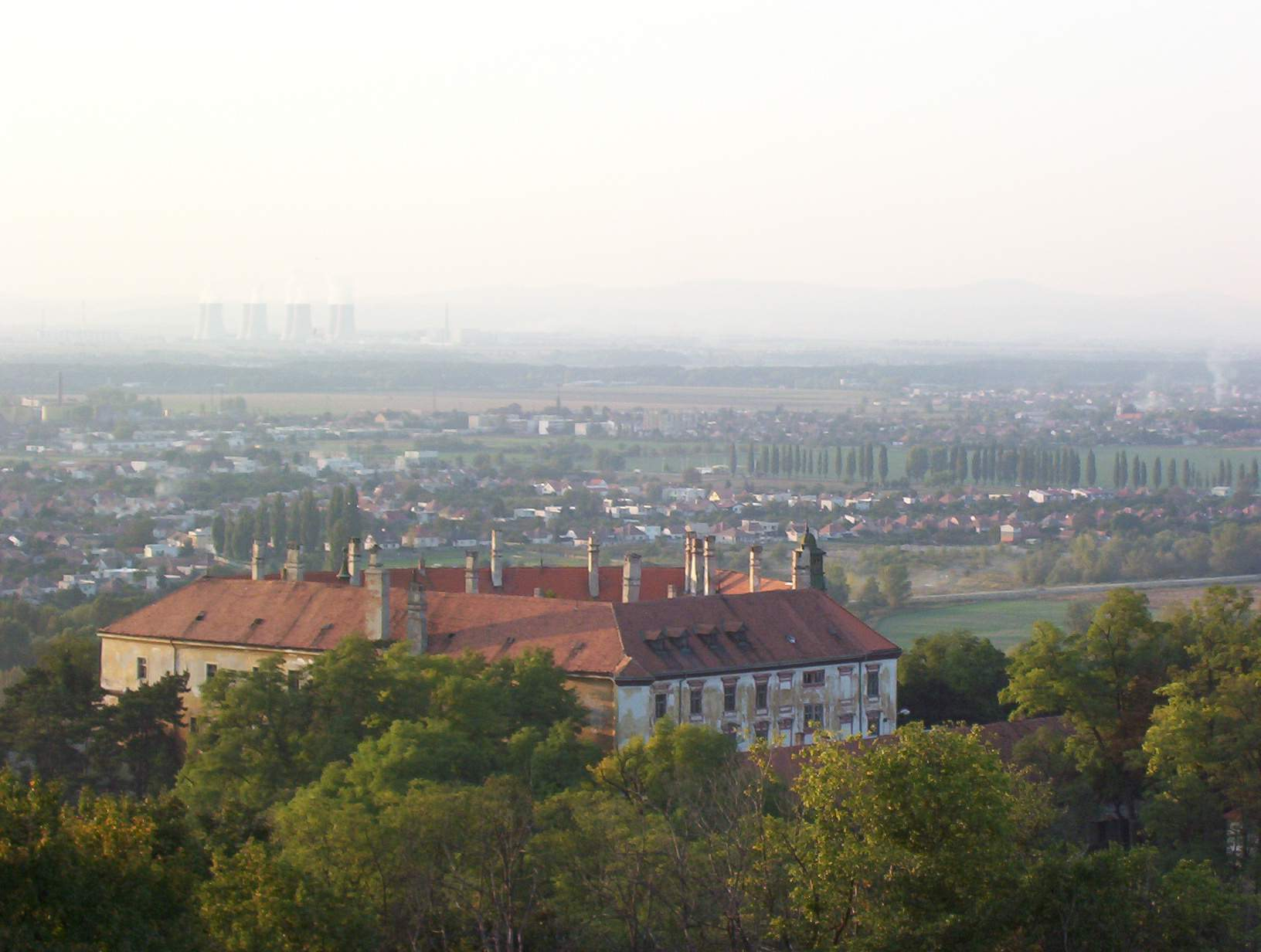
- Country: Slovakia
- Region (kraj): Trnava Region
- Seat: Hlohovec

Area
  - Total: 267.22 km^{2} (103.17 sq mi)

Population (2025)
  - Total: 42,519
- Time zone: UTC+1 (CET)
  - Summer (DST): UTC+2 (CEST)
- Telephone prefix: 033
- Vehicle registration plate (until 2022): HC
- Municipalities: 24

Hlohovec District (Slovak: okres Hlohovec) is a district in the Trnava Region of western Slovakia. District is located on a valley lowlands of Váh river. In its current borders had been established in 1996. Most important economy branches are production of metallurgy products and the pharmaceutical industry. Its administrative seat is the town of Hlohovec. District is important for its transport location, Leopoldov is a railway hub and a D1 motorway connects the district area to Trnava, Bratislava and other Slovak regions. Hlohovec district consists of 24 municipalities, in two of them are towns.

== Population ==
Population statistic (10 years)
Year	1995	2005	2015	2025
Count	45,595	45,335	45,554	42,519
Difference		−0.57%	+0.48%	−6.66%

Population statistic
Year	2024	2025
Count	42,762	42,519
Difference		−0.56%

It has a population of 42,519 people (31 December 2025).

Historical population
Year	Pop.	±%
1970	42,561	—
1980	44,838	+5.3%
1991	45,005	+0.4%
2001	45,351	+0.8%
2011	45,761	+0.9%
2021	44,015	−3.8%
Source: Statistical Office of the Slovak Republic

=== Ethnicity ===
Census 2021 (1+ %)
Ethnicity	Number	Fraction
Slovak	41,597	93.11%
Not found out	2213	4.95%
Total	44,673	

In year 2021 was 44,673 people by ethnicity 41,597 as Slovak, 2213 as Not found out, 267 as Czech, 104 as Hungarian, 95 as Other, 76 as Romani, 51 as Russian, 41 as Rusyn, 29 as Ukrainian, 28 as German, 23 as Serbian, 21 as Polish, 17 as Vietnamese, 17 as Italian, 13 as Bulgarian, 11 as Jewish, 10 as Moravian, 9 as Croatian, 9 as English, 8 as French, 8 as Albanian, 7 as Chinese, 6 as Romanian, 4 as Austrian, 3 as Silesian, 2 as Irish, 2 as Canadian and 2 as Greek.

Note on population: The difference values of population numbers in the table "Population statistic" and in the sections "Ethnicity" & "Religion" is caused by the use of various statistical methods.

=== Religion ===
Census 2021 (1+ %)
Religion	Number	Fraction
Roman Catholic Church	29,285	66.53%
None	9591	21.79%
Not found out	2578	5.86%
Evangelical Church	1404	3.19%
Total	44,015	

In year 2021 was 44,015 people by religion 29,285 from Roman Catholic Church, 9591 from None, 2578 from Not found out, 1404 from Evangelical Church, 207 from Greek Catholic Church, 181 from Christian Congregations in Slovakia, 176 from Ad hoc movements, 125 from Other, 70 from Eastern Orthodox Church, 69 from Other and not ascertained christian church, 60 from Jehovah's Witnesses, 57 from Buddhism, 47 from Paganism and natural spirituality, 43 from Calvinist Church, 36 from Apostolic Church, 29 from Islam, 14 from Old Catholic Church, 12 from United Methodist Church, 9 from Seventh-day Adventist Church, 5 from Czechoslovak Hussite Church, 4 from Hinduism, 4 from Baptists Church, 3 from Jewish community, 3 from Church of the Brethren, 1 from New Apostolic Church, 1 from Church of Jesus Christ of Latter-day Saints and 1 from Bahá'i Community.

== Municipalities ==
Municipality	Area [km^{2}]	Population
Bojničky	9.26	1,441
Červeník	9.93	1,720
Dolné Otrokovce	9.30	398
Dolné Trhovište	10.05	572
Dolné Zelenice	2.71	615
Dvorníky	25.53	1,952
Hlohovec	64.12	19,214
Horné Otrokovce	9.05	907
Horné Trhovište	7.54	574
Horné Zelenice	4.24	704
Jalšové	9.33	475
Kľačany	10.10	1,135
Koplotovce	5.79	844
Leopoldov	5.65	3,850
Madunice	11.93	2,343
Merašice	4.93	447
Pastuchov	15.23	940
Ratkovce	4.45	365
Sasinkovo	12.41	801
Siladice	7.60	638
Tekolďany	2.59	116
Tepličky	5.67	319
Trakovice	11.63	1,523
Žlkovce	7.93	626

Population and area values are current for year 2025.
