= Dolné Otrokovce =

- Municipality
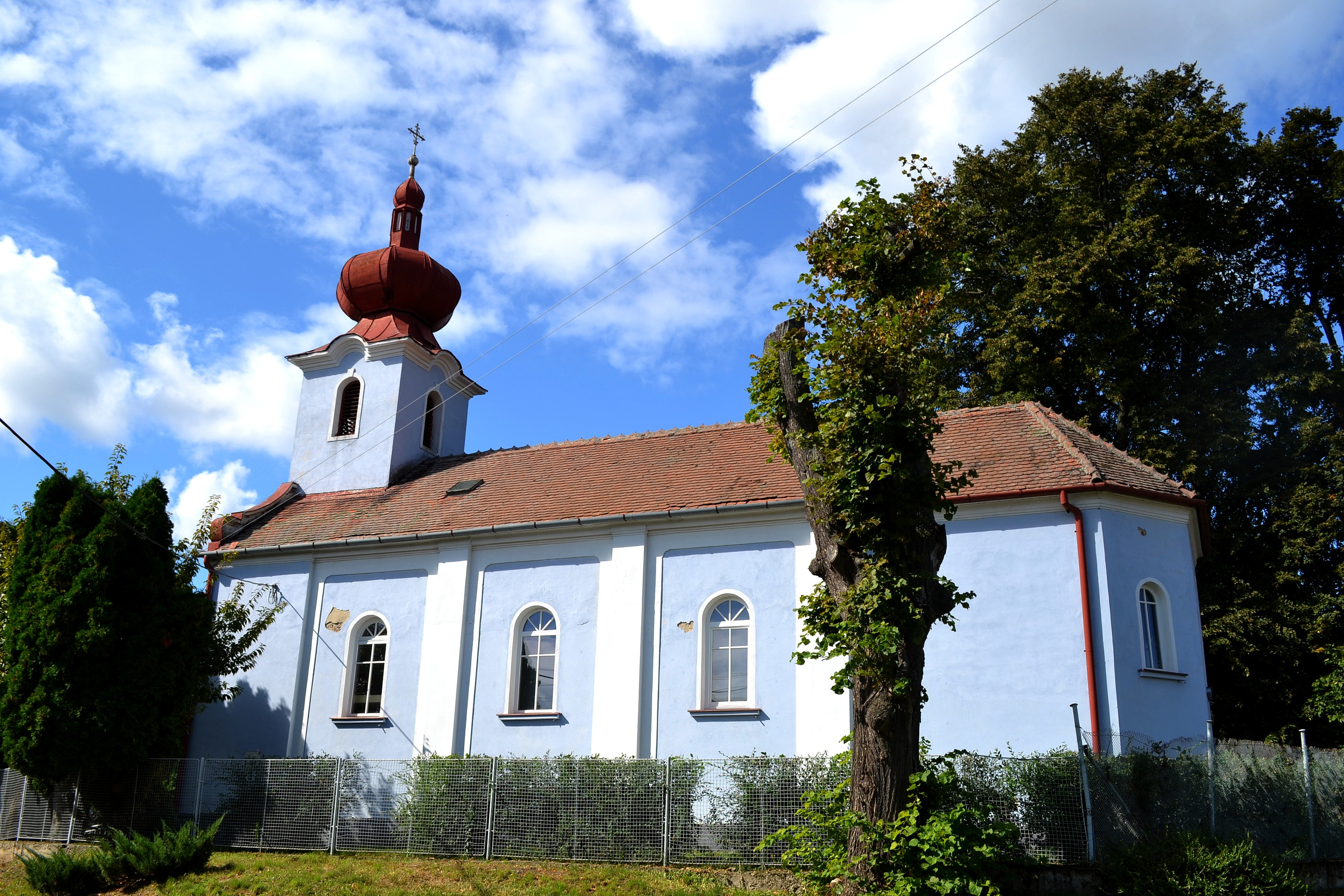
- Church in Dolné Otrokovce

- Flag

- Location of Dolné Otrokovce in the Trnava Region Location of Dolné Otrokovce in Slovakia
- Coordinates: 48.47°N 17.93°E
- Country: Slovakia
- Region: Trnava Region
- District: Hlohovec District
- First mentioned: 1400

Area
  - Total: 9.30 km^{2} (3.59 sq mi)
- Elevation: 185 m (607 ft)

Population (2025)
  - Total: 398
- Time zone: UTC+1 (CET)
  - Summer (DST): UTC+2 (CEST)
- Postal code: 920 61
- Area code: +421 33
- Vehicle registration plate (until 2022): HC
- Website: dolneotrokovce.sk

Dolné Otrokovce (Hungarian: Alsóatrak) is a village and municipality in Hlohovec District in the Trnava Region of western Slovakia.

== History ==
In historical records the village was first mentioned in 1400.

== Geography ==
The municipality lies at an altitude of 185 metres (607 ft) and covers an area of 9.30 km^{2} (3.59 sq mi) (2025).

== Population ==
Population statistic (10 years)
Year	1995	2005	2015	2025
Count	320	348	380	398
Difference		+8.75%	+9.19%	+4.73%

Population statistic
Year	2024	2025
Count	396	398
Difference		+0.50%

It has a population of 398 people (31 December 2025).

=== Ethnicity ===
Census 2021 (1+ %)
Ethnicity	Number	Fraction
Slovak	379	98.18%
Not found out	5	1.29%
Total	386	

In year 2021 was 386 people by ethnicity 379 as Slovak, 5 as Not found out, 3 as Hungarian, 2 as French, 1 as Czech and 1 as Russian.

Note on population: The difference values of population numbers in the table "Population statistic" and in the sections "Ethnicity" & "Religion" is caused by the use of various statistical methods.

=== Religion ===
Census 2021 (1+ %)
Religion	Number	Fraction
Roman Catholic Church	307	79.53%
None	53	13.73%
Evangelical Church	10	2.59%
Not found out	7	1.81%
Total	386	

In year 2021 was 386 people by religion 307 from Roman Catholic Church, 53 from None, 10 from Evangelical Church, 7 from Not found out, 3 from Christian Congregations in Slovakia, 3 from Greek Catholic Church, 2 from Ad hoc movements and 1 from Other.

== Genealogical resources ==
The records for genealogical research are available at the state archive "Statny Archiv in Bratislava, Nitra, Slovakia"

- Roman Catholic church records (births/marriages/deaths): 1719-1899 (parish B)

== See also ==
- List of municipalities and towns in Slovakia
