= Pastuchov =

- Municipality
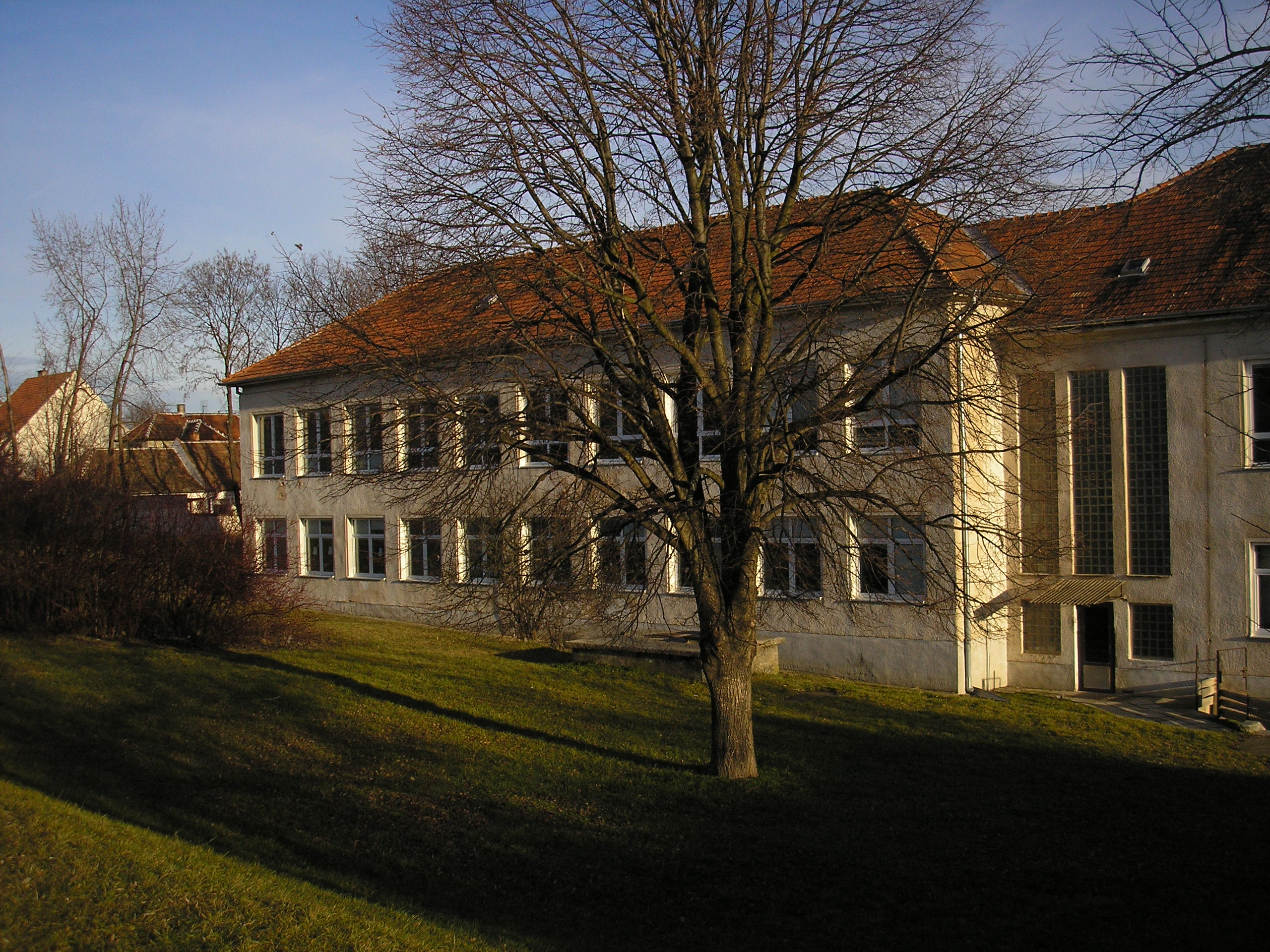

- Flag

- Location of Pastuchov in the Trnava Region Location of Pastuchov in Slovakia
- Coordinates: 48.43°N 17.88°E
- Country: Slovakia
- Region: Trnava Region
- District: Hlohovec District
- First mentioned: 1275

Area
  - Total: 15.23 km^{2} (5.88 sq mi)
- Elevation: 220 m (720 ft)

Population (2025)
  - Total: 940
- Time zone: UTC+1 (CET)
  - Summer (DST): UTC+2 (CEST)
- Postal code: 920 63
- Area code: +421 33
- Vehicle registration plate (until 2022): HC
- Website: www.pastuchov.sk

Pastuchov (Hungarian: Nyitrapásztó) is a village and municipality in Hlohovec District in the Trnava Region of western Slovakia.

== History ==
In historical records the village was first mentioned in 1275.

== Geography ==
The municipality lies at an altitude of 220 metres (720 ft) and covers an area of 15.23 km^{2} (5.88 sq mi) (2025).

== Population ==
Population statistic (10 years)
Year	1995	2005	2015	2025
Count	969	998	964	940
Difference		+2.99%	−3.40%	−2.48%

Population statistic
Year	2024	2025
Count	934	940
Difference		+0.64%

It has a population of 940 people (31 December 2025).

=== Ethnicity ===
Census 2021 (1+ %)
Ethnicity	Number	Fraction
Slovak	945	96.82%
Not found out	21	2.15%
Czech	11	1.12%
Total	976	

In year 2021 was 976 people by ethnicity 945 as Slovak, 21 as Not found out, 11 as Czech, 3 as Moravian, 2 as Hungarian, 1 as Ukrainian, 1 as Russian, 1 as Romanian and 1 as French.

Note on population: The difference values of population numbers in the table "Population statistic" and in the sections "Ethnicity" & "Religion" is caused by the use of various statistical methods.

=== Religion ===
Census 2021 (1+ %)
Religion	Number	Fraction
Roman Catholic Church	637	65.27%
Evangelical Church	147	15.06%
None	137	14.04%
Not found out	29	2.97%
Ad hoc movements	11	1.13%
Total	976	

In year 2021 was 976 people by religion 637 from Roman Catholic Church, 147 from Evangelical Church, 137 from None, 29 from Not found out, 11 from Ad hoc movements, 8 from Greek Catholic Church, 2 from United Methodist Church, 1 from Eastern Orthodox Church, 1 from Other and not ascertained christian church, 1 from Christian Congregations in Slovakia, 1 from Other and 1 from Buddhism.
