= Horné Zelenice =

- Municipality
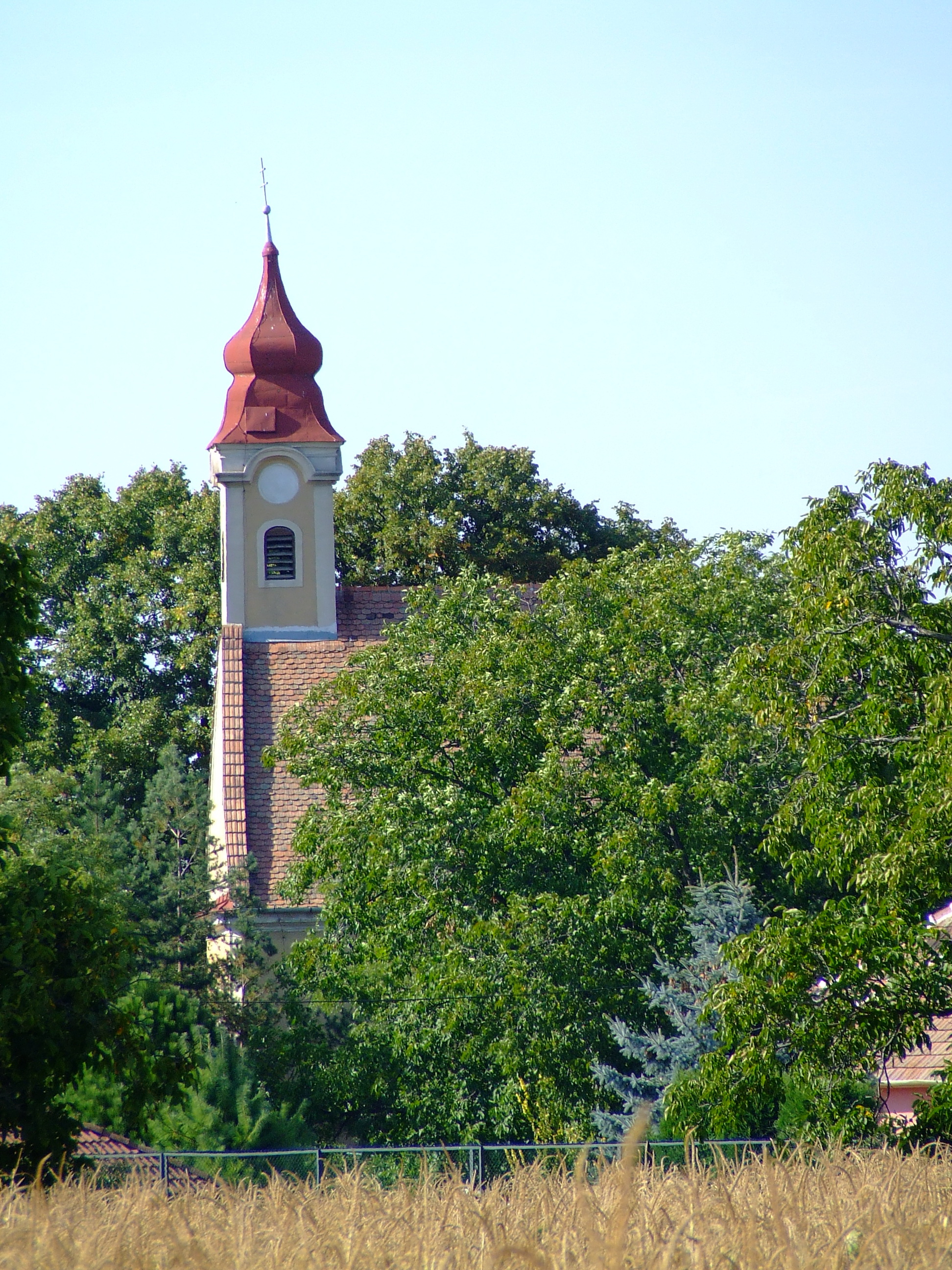
- St Martin's Church in Horné Zelenice

- Flag

- Location of Horné Zelenice in the Trnava Region Location of Horné Zelenice in Slovakia
- Coordinates: 48.38°N 17.77°E
- Country: Slovakia
- Region: Trnava Region
- District: Hlohovec District
- First mentioned: 1244

Area
  - Total: 4.24 km^{2} (1.64 sq mi)
- Elevation: 137 m (449 ft)

Population (2025)
  - Total: 704
- Time zone: UTC+1 (CET)
  - Summer (DST): UTC+2 (CEST)
- Postal code: 920 52
- Area code: +421 33
- Vehicle registration plate (until 2022): HC
- Website: horne.zelenice.sk

Horné Zelenice (Hungarian: Felsőzélle) is a village and municipality in Hlohovec District in the Trnava Region of western Slovakia.

== History ==
In historical records the village was first mentioned in 1244.

== Geography ==
The municipality lies at an altitude of 137 metres (449 ft) and covers an area of 4.24 km^{2} (1.64 sq mi) (2025).

== Population ==
Population statistic (10 years)
Year	1995	2005	2015	2025
Count	616	654	701	704
Difference		+6.16%	+7.18%	+0.42%

Population statistic
Year	2024	2025
Count	713	704
Difference		−1.26%

It has a population of 704 people (31 December 2025).

=== Ethnicity ===
Census 2021 (1+ %)
Ethnicity	Number	Fraction
Slovak	668	96.53%
Not found out	21	3.03%
Total	692	

In year 2021 was 692 people by ethnicity 668 as Slovak, 21 as Not found out, 4 as Other, 3 as Czech, 2 as Romani, 1 as Ukrainian, 1 as Serbian, 1 as Russian, 1 as Hungarian and 1 as Bulgarian.

Note on population: The difference values of population numbers in the table "Population statistic" and in the sections "Ethnicity" & "Religion" is caused by the use of various statistical methods.

=== Religion ===
Census 2021 (1+ %)
Religion	Number	Fraction
Roman Catholic Church	319	46.1%
Evangelical Church	215	31.07%
None	114	16.47%
Not found out	34	4.91%
Total	692	

In year 2021 was 692 people by religion 319 from Roman Catholic Church, 215 from Evangelical Church, 114 from None, 34 from Not found out, 2 from Eastern Orthodox Church, 2 from Buddhism, 1 from Calvinist Church, 1 from Islam, 1 from Other, 1 from United Methodist Church, 1 from Church of the Brethren and 1 from Ad hoc movements.

== Genealogical resources ==
The records for genealogical research are available at the state archive "Statny Archiv in Bratislava, Nitra, Slovakia"

- Roman Catholic church records (births/marriages/deaths): 1771-1911 (parish A)
- Lutheran church records (births/marriages/deaths): 1792-1928 (parish A)

== See also ==
- List of municipalities and towns in Slovakia
