= Jalšové =

- Municipality
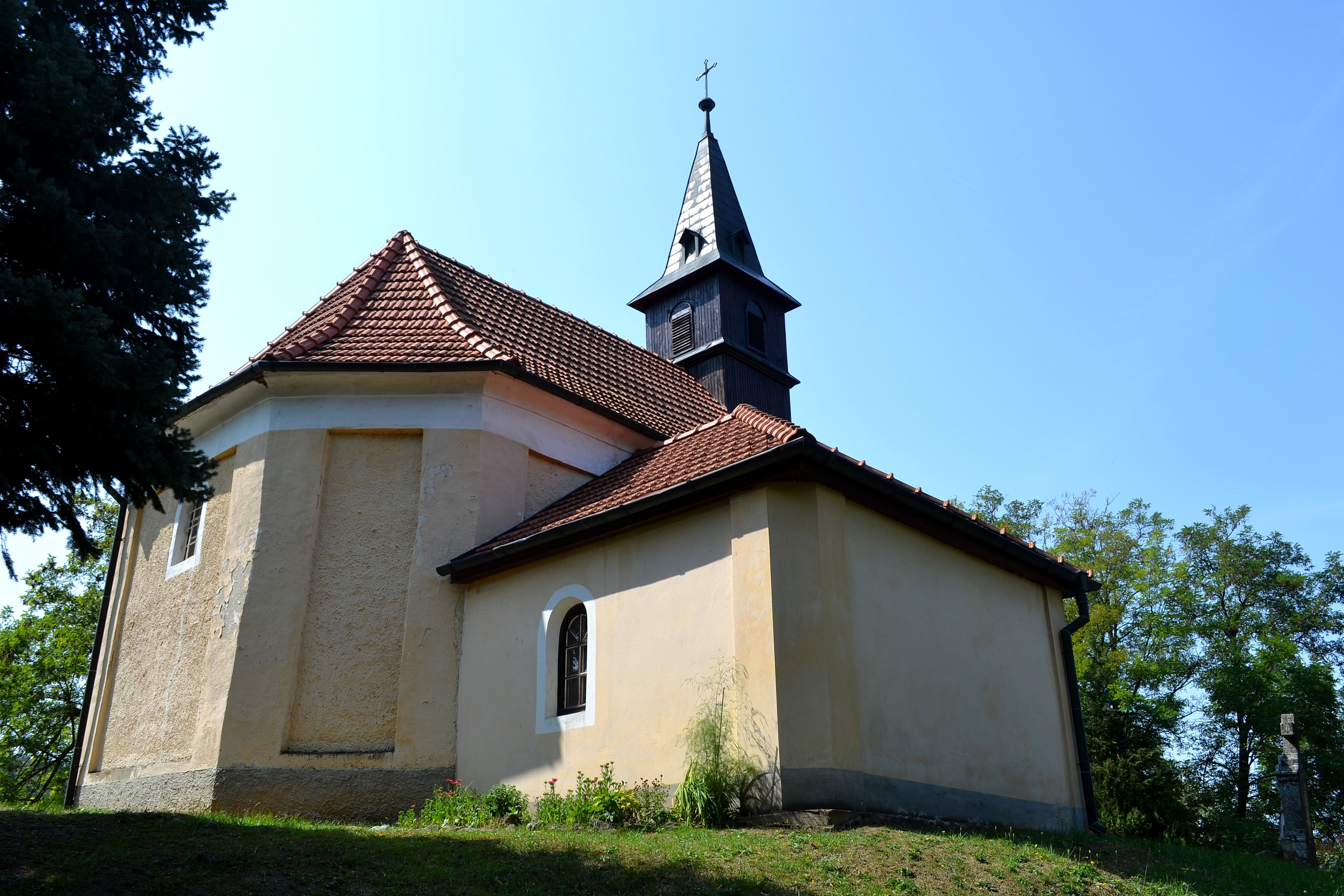
- Church in Jalšové

- Flag

- Location of Jalšové in the Trnava Region Location of Jalšové in Slovakia
- Coordinates: 48.50°N 17.83°E
- Country: Slovakia
- Region: Trnava Region
- District: Hlohovec District
- First mentioned: 1352

Area
  - Total: 9.33 km^{2} (3.60 sq mi)
- Elevation: 161 m (528 ft)

Population (2025)
  - Total: 475
- Time zone: UTC+1 (CET)
  - Summer (DST): UTC+2 (CEST)
- Postal code: 922 31
- Area code: +421 33
- Vehicle registration plate (until 2022): HC
- Website: www.obecjalsove.sk

Jalšové (Hungarian: Jalsó) is a village and municipality in the Hlohovec District in the Trnava Region of western Slovakia.

== History ==
In historical records the village was first mentioned in 1351.

== Geography ==
The municipality lies at an altitude of 161 metres (528 ft) and covers an area of 9.33 km^{2} (3.60 sq mi) (2025).

== Population ==
Population statistic (10 years)
Year	1995	2005	2015	2025
Count	483	469	493	475
Difference		−2.89%	+5.11%	−3.65%

Population statistic
Year	2024	2025
Count	473	475
Difference		+0.42%

It has a population of 475 people (31 December 2025).

=== Ethnicity ===
Census 2021 (1+ %)
Ethnicity	Number	Fraction
Slovak	476	97.74%
Not found out	6	1.23%
Total	487	

In year 2021 was 487 people by ethnicity 476 as Slovak, 6 as Not found out, 2 as Czech, 1 as Ukrainian, 1 as Russian, 1 as Austrian, 1 as Hungarian and 1 as Bulgarian.

Note on population: The difference values of population numbers in the table "Population statistic" and in the sections "Ethnicity" & "Religion" is caused by the use of various statistical methods.

=== Religion ===
Census 2021 (1+ %)
Religion	Number	Fraction
Roman Catholic Church	368	75.56%
None	86	17.66%
Not found out	17	3.49%
Total	487	

In year 2021 was 487 people by religion 368 from Roman Catholic Church, 86 from None, 17 from Not found out, 4 from Jehovah's Witnesses, 3 from Evangelical Church, 3 from Ad hoc movements, 2 from Christian Congregations in Slovakia, 2 from Greek Catholic Church, 1 from Eastern Orthodox Church and 1 from Other.

== Genealogical resources ==
The records for genealogical research are available at the state archive "Statny Archiv in Bratislava, Slovakia"

- Roman Catholic church records (births/marriages/deaths): 1770-1927 (parish B)

== See also ==
- List of municipalities and towns in Slovakia
