= Koplotovce =

- Municipality
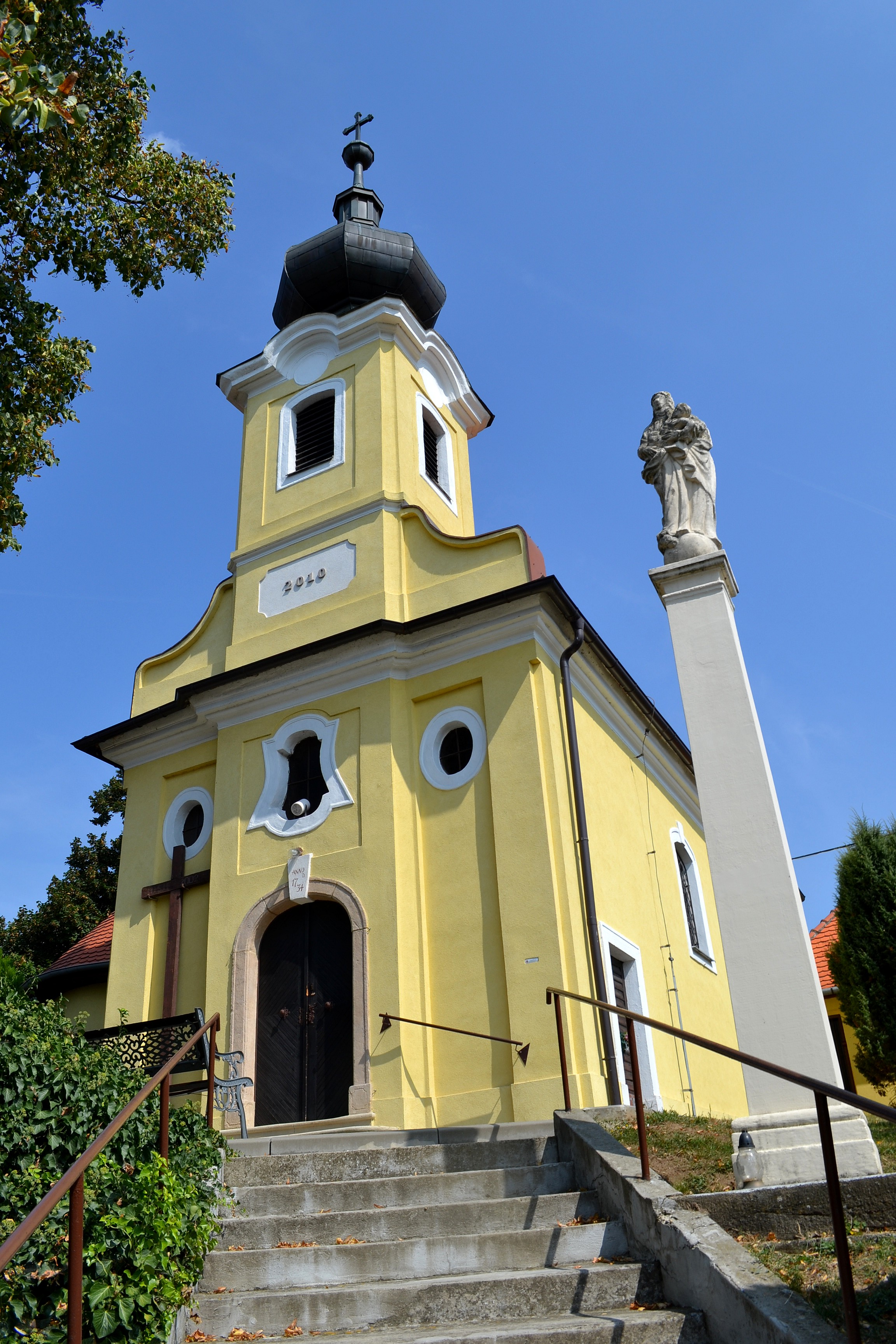

- Flag

- Location of Koplotovce in the Trnava Region Location of Koplotovce in Slovakia
- Coordinates: 48.47°N 17.82°E
- Country: Slovakia
- Region: Trnava Region
- District: Hlohovec District
- First mentioned: 1113

Area
  - Total: 5.79 km^{2} (2.24 sq mi)
- Elevation: 159 m (522 ft)

Population (2025)
  - Total: 844
- Time zone: UTC+1 (CET)
  - Summer (DST): UTC+2 (CEST)
- Postal code: 920 01
- Area code: +421 33
- Vehicle registration plate (until 2022): HC
- Website: www.koplotovce.sk

Koplotovce (Hungarian: Kaplat) is a village and municipality in Hlohovec District in the Trnava Region of western Slovakia.

== History ==
In historical records the village was first mentioned in 1113.

== Geography ==
The municipality lies at an altitude of 159 metres (522 ft) and covers an area of 5.79 km^{2} (2.24 sq mi) (2025).

== Population ==
Population statistic (10 years)
Year	1995	2005	2015	2025
Count	538	587	783	844
Difference		+9.10%	+33.39%	+7.79%

Population statistic
Year	2024	2025
Count	848	844
Difference		−0.47%

It has a population of 844 people (31 December 2025).

=== Ethnicity ===
Census 2021 (1+ %)
Ethnicity	Number	Fraction
Slovak	760	96.81%
Not found out	24	3.05%
Total	785	

In year 2021 was 785 people by ethnicity 760 as Slovak, 24 as Not found out, 4 as Other, 3 as Romani, 2 as Rusyn, 2 as Hungarian and 1 as Serbian.

Note on population: The difference values of population numbers in the table "Population statistic" and in the sections "Ethnicity" & "Religion" is caused by the use of various statistical methods.

=== Religion ===
Census 2021 (1+ %)
Religion	Number	Fraction
Roman Catholic Church	567	72.23%
None	170	21.66%
Not found out	24	3.06%
Evangelical Church	10	1.27%
Total	785	

In year 2021 was 785 people by religion 567 from Roman Catholic Church, 170 from None, 24 from Not found out, 10 from Evangelical Church, 3 from Islam, 3 from Greek Catholic Church, 2 from Other, 2 from Buddhism, 2 from Ad hoc movements, 1 from Paganism and natural spirituality and 1 from Other and not ascertained christian church.

== Genealogical resources ==
The records for genealogical research are available at the state archive "Statny Archiv in Bratislava, Nitra, Slovakia"

- Roman Catholic church records (births/marriages/deaths): 1660-1901 (parish B)

== See also ==
- List of municipalities and towns in Slovakia
