= Rišňovce =

Rišňovce Récsény
- Municipality
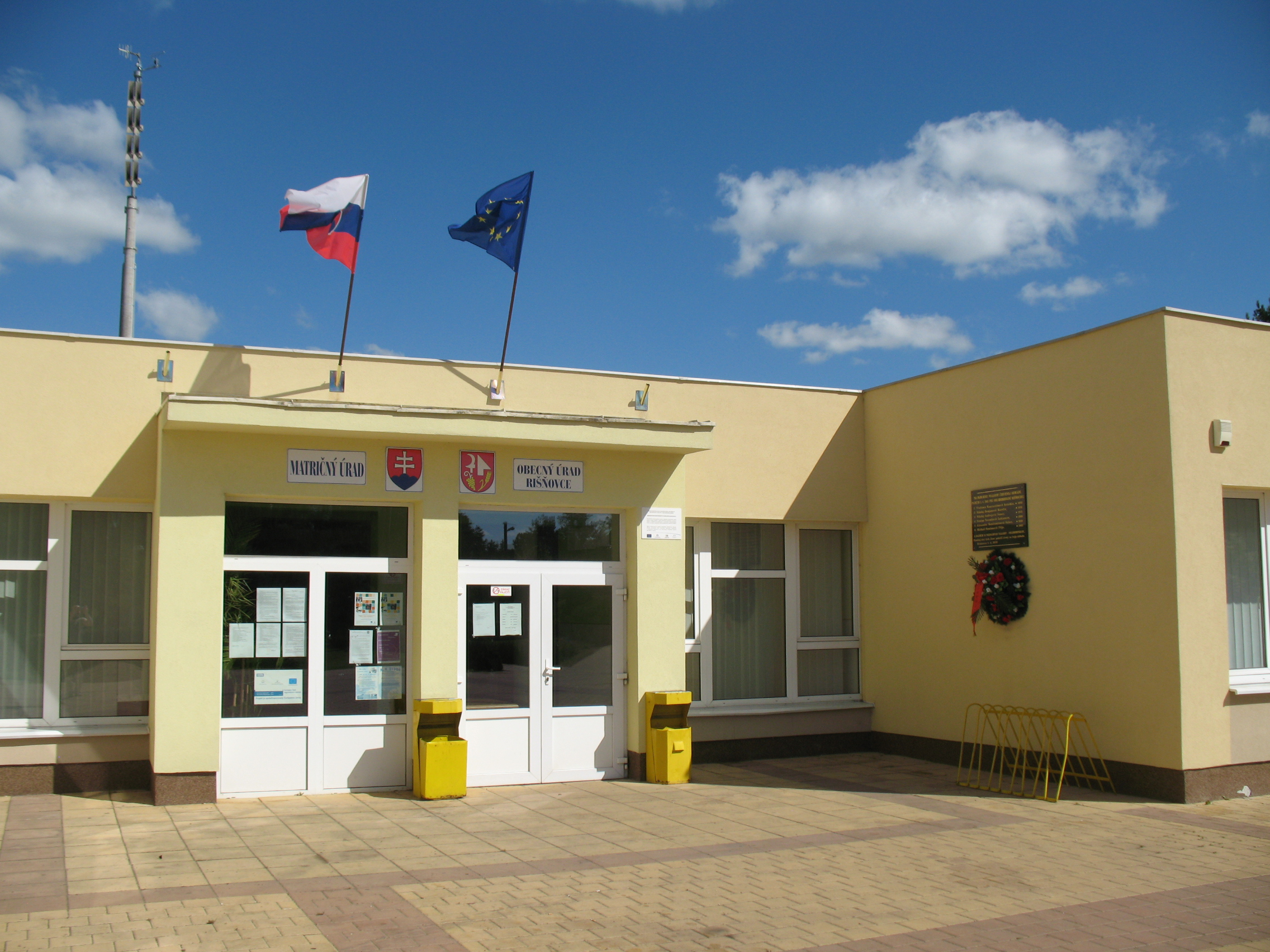

- Flag

- Location of Rišňovce in the Nitra Region Location of Rišňovce in Slovakia
- Coordinates: 48.37°N 17.90°E
- Country: Slovakia
- Region: Nitra Region
- District: Nitra District
- First mentioned: 1272

Area
  - Total: 18.78 km^{2} (7.25 sq mi)
- Elevation: 159 m (522 ft)

Population (2025)
  - Total: 2,118
- Time zone: UTC+1 (CET)
  - Summer (DST): UTC+2 (CEST)
- Postal code: 951 21
- Area code: +421 37
- Vehicle registration plate (until 2022): NR
- Website: risnovce.sk

Rišňovce (Slovak pronunciation: [ˈriʂɲɔwtse]; Hungarian: Récsény) is a village and municipality in the Nitra District in western central Slovakia, in the Nitra Region.

== History ==
In historical records the village was first mentioned in 1272.

== Geography ==
The municipality lies at an altitude of 159 metres (522 ft) and covers an area of 18.78 km^{2} (7.25 sq mi) (2025).

== Population ==
Population statistic (10 years)
Year	1995	2005	2015	2025
Count	1899	1996	2064	2118
Difference		+5.10%	+3.40%	+2.61%

Population statistic
Year	2024	2025
Count	2132	2118
Difference		−0.65%

It has a population of 2118 people (31 December 2025).

=== Ethnicity ===
Census 2021 (1+ %)
Ethnicity	Number	Fraction
Slovak	1997	95.27%
Not found out	90	4.29%
Total	2096	

In year 2021 was 2096 people by ethnicity 1997 as Slovak, 90 as Not found out, 10 as Czech, 9 as Other, 7 as Hungarian, 3 as Turkish, 2 as Russian, 2 as English, 1 as Romani, 1 as German, 1 as Moravian and 1 as Croatian.

Note on population: The difference values of population numbers in the table "Population statistic" and in the sections "Ethnicity" & "Religion" is caused by the use of various statistical methods.

=== Religion ===
Census 2021 (1+ %)
Religion	Number	Fraction
Roman Catholic Church	1624	77.48%
None	319	15.22%
Not found out	80	3.82%
Evangelical Church	29	1.38%
Total	2096	

In year 2021 was 2096 people by religion 1624 from Roman Catholic Church, 319 from None, 80 from Not found out, 29 from Evangelical Church, 16 from Greek Catholic Church, 6 from Ad hoc movements, 5 from Other, 2 from Calvinist Church, 2 from Jehovah's Witnesses, 2 from Christian Congregations in Slovakia, 2 from Hinduism, 2 from Buddhism, 1 from Old Catholic Church, 1 from Eastern Orthodox Church, 1 from Paganism and natural spirituality, 1 from Islam, 1 from Czechoslovak Hussite Church, 1 from Church of Jesus Christ of Latter-day Saints and 1 from Bahá'i Community.
