= Kľačany =

- Municipality
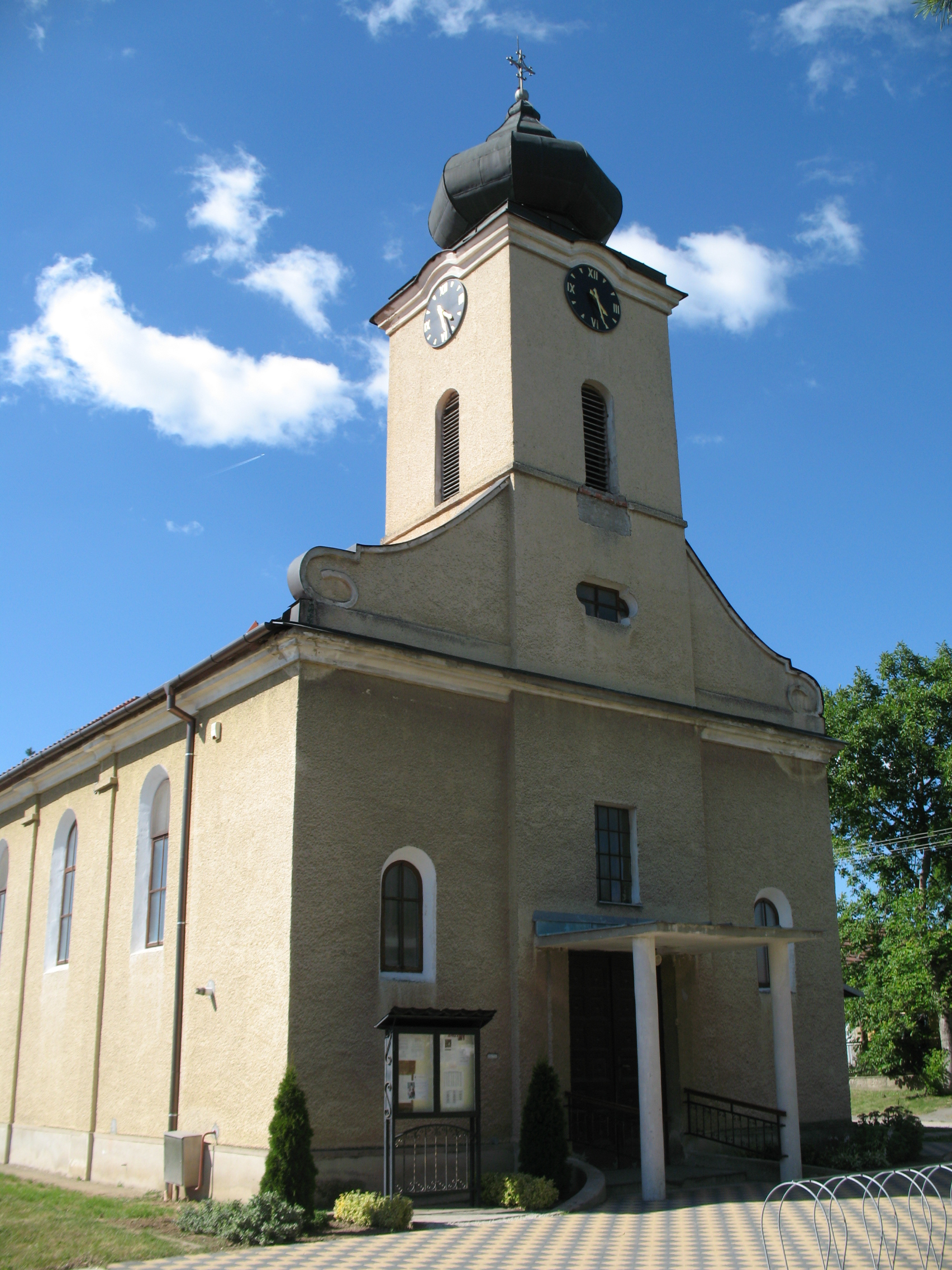

- Location of Kľačany in the Trnava Region Location of Kľačany in Slovakia
- Coordinates: 48.39°N 17.87°E
- Country: Slovakia
- Region: Trnava Region
- District: Hlohovec District
- First mentioned: 1256

Area
  - Total: 10.10 km^{2} (3.90 sq mi)
- Elevation: 169 m (554 ft)

Population (2025)
  - Total: 1,135
- Time zone: UTC+1 (CET)
  - Summer (DST): UTC+2 (CEST)
- Postal code: 920 64
- Area code: +421 33
- Vehicle registration plate (until 2022): HC
- Website: www.obec-klacany.sk

Kľačany (Hungarian: Décskelecsény) is a village and municipality in Hlohovec District in the Trnava Region of western Slovakia.

== Etymology ==
Slovak Kľačane – settlers living near "kľak" ("bended wood", typically a floodplain forest or knee timber).

== History ==
In historical records the village was first mentioned in 1256.

== Geography ==
The municipality lies at an altitude of 169 metres (554 ft) and covers an area of 10.10 km^{2} (3.90 sq mi) (2025).

== Population ==
Population statistic (10 years)
Year	1995	2005	2015	2025
Count	962	982	1056	1135
Difference		+2.07%	+7.53%	+7.48%

Population statistic
Year	2024	2025
Count	1143	1135
Difference		−0.69%

It has a population of 1135 people (31 December 2025).

=== Ethnicity ===
Census 2021 (1+ %)
Ethnicity	Number	Fraction
Slovak	1079	95.74%
Not found out	45	3.99%
Total	1127	

In year 2021 was 1127 people by ethnicity 1079 as Slovak, 45 as Not found out, 4 as Czech, 3 as Romani, 2 as Other, 2 as English, 1 as Rusyn and 1 as Greek.

Note on population: The difference values of population numbers in the table "Population statistic" and in the sections "Ethnicity" & "Religion" is caused by the use of various statistical methods.

=== Religion ===
Census 2021 (1+ %)
Religion	Number	Fraction
Roman Catholic Church	815	72.32%
None	209	18.54%
Not found out	54	4.79%
Evangelical Church	30	2.66%
Total	1127	

In year 2021 was 1127 people by religion 815 from Roman Catholic Church, 209 from None, 54 from Not found out, 30 from Evangelical Church, 5 from Other and not ascertained christian church, 3 from Paganism and natural spirituality, 3 from Jehovah's Witnesses, 2 from Christian Congregations in Slovakia, 2 from Other, 2 from Ad hoc movements, 1 from Eastern Orthodox Church and 1 from Greek Catholic Church.

== Genealogical resources ==
The records for genealogical research are available at the state archive "Statny Archiv in Nitra, Slovakia"

- Roman Catholic church records (births/marriages/deaths): 1756-1895 (parish B)
- Lutheran church records (births/marriages/deaths): 1783-1919 (parish B)

== See also ==
- List of municipalities and towns in Slovakia
