= Červeník =

- Municipality
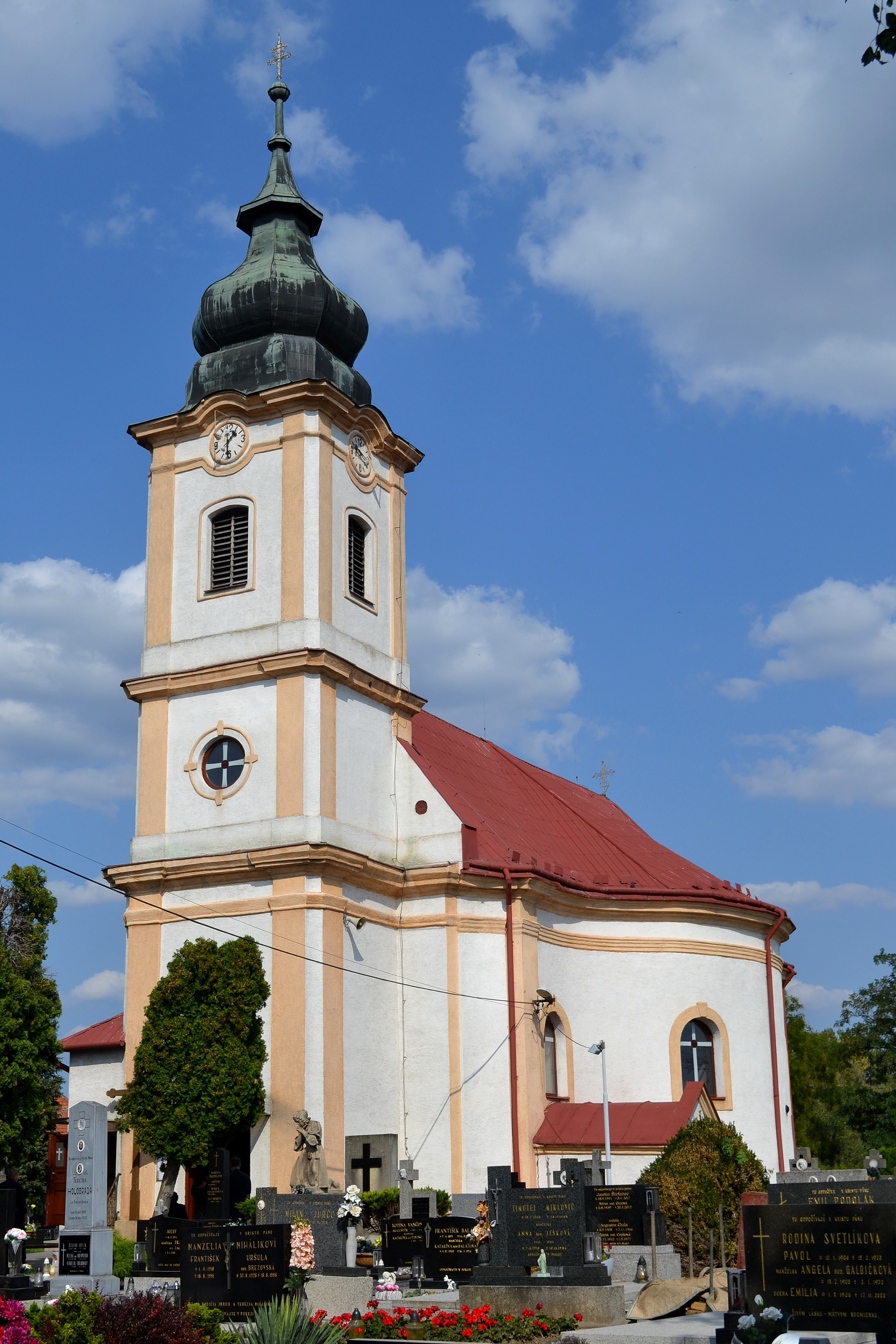
- Church in Červeník

- Flag

- Location of Červeník in the Trnava Region Location of Červeník in Slovakia
- Coordinates: 48.45°N 17.75°E
- Country: Slovakia
- Region: Trnava Region
- District: Hlohovec District
- First mentioned: 1113

Area
  - Total: 9.93 km^{2} (3.83 sq mi)
- Elevation: 144 m (472 ft)

Population (2025)
  - Total: 1,720
- Time zone: UTC+1 (CET)
  - Summer (DST): UTC+2 (CEST)
- Postal code: 920 42
- Area code: +421 33
- Vehicle registration plate (until 2022): HC
- Website: www.cervenik.sk

Červeník (Hungarian: Vágvörösvár) is a village and municipality in Hlohovec District in the Trnava Region of western Slovakia.

== History ==
In historical records the village was first mentioned in 1113. The first known name of the village was "Bin", it was changed to "Wereswar" in 1394, in 1661 to "Veresvar", and in 1911 it was Vorosvar (which means "Red Castle" in Hungarian). In 1920 Vorosvar was changed to the "Slovak-like" name Veresvar nad Vahom (Verešvár nad Váhom) and finally, in 1948 to Červeník.

== Geography ==
The municipality lies at an altitude of 144 metres (472 ft) and covers an area of 9.93 km^{2} (3.83 sq mi) (2025).

== Population ==
Population statistic (10 years)
Year	1995	2005	2015	2025
Count	1433	1510	1664	1720
Difference		+5.37%	+10.19%	+3.36%

Population statistic
Year	2024	2025
Count	1691	1720
Difference		+1.71%

It has a population of 1720 people (31 December 2025).

=== Ethnicity ===
Census 2021 (1+ %)
Ethnicity	Number	Fraction
Slovak	1615	95.84%
Not found out	71	4.21%
Total	1685	

In year 2021 was 1685 people by ethnicity 1615 as Slovak, 71 as Not found out, 7 as Czech, 3 as Serbian, 3 as English, 2 as German, 1 as Jewish, 1 as Italian, 1 as Hungarian and 1 as Other.

Note on population: The difference values of population numbers in the table "Population statistic" and in the sections "Ethnicity" & "Religion" is caused by the use of various statistical methods.

=== Religion ===
Census 2021 (1+ %)
Religion	Number	Fraction
Roman Catholic Church	1332	79.05%
None	236	14.01%
Not found out	69	4.09%
Evangelical Church	19	1.13%
Total	1685	

In year 2021 was 1685 people by religion 1332 from Roman Catholic Church, 236 from None, 69 from Not found out, 19 from Evangelical Church, 6 from Other and not ascertained christian church, 6 from Greek Catholic Church, 6 from Ad hoc movements, 4 from Christian Congregations in Slovakia, 3 from Other, 1 from Old Catholic Church, 1 from Eastern Orthodox Church, 1 from Paganism and natural spirituality and 1 from Jehovah's Witnesses.

== Genealogical resources ==
The records for genealogical research are available at the state archive "Statny Archiv in Banska Bystrica, Nitra, Slovakia"

- Roman Catholic church records (births/marriages/deaths): 1666-1911 (parish B)

== See also ==
- List of municipalities and towns in Slovakia
