= Trnava Region =

Region of Slovakia

Trnava Region Trnavský kraj
- Region
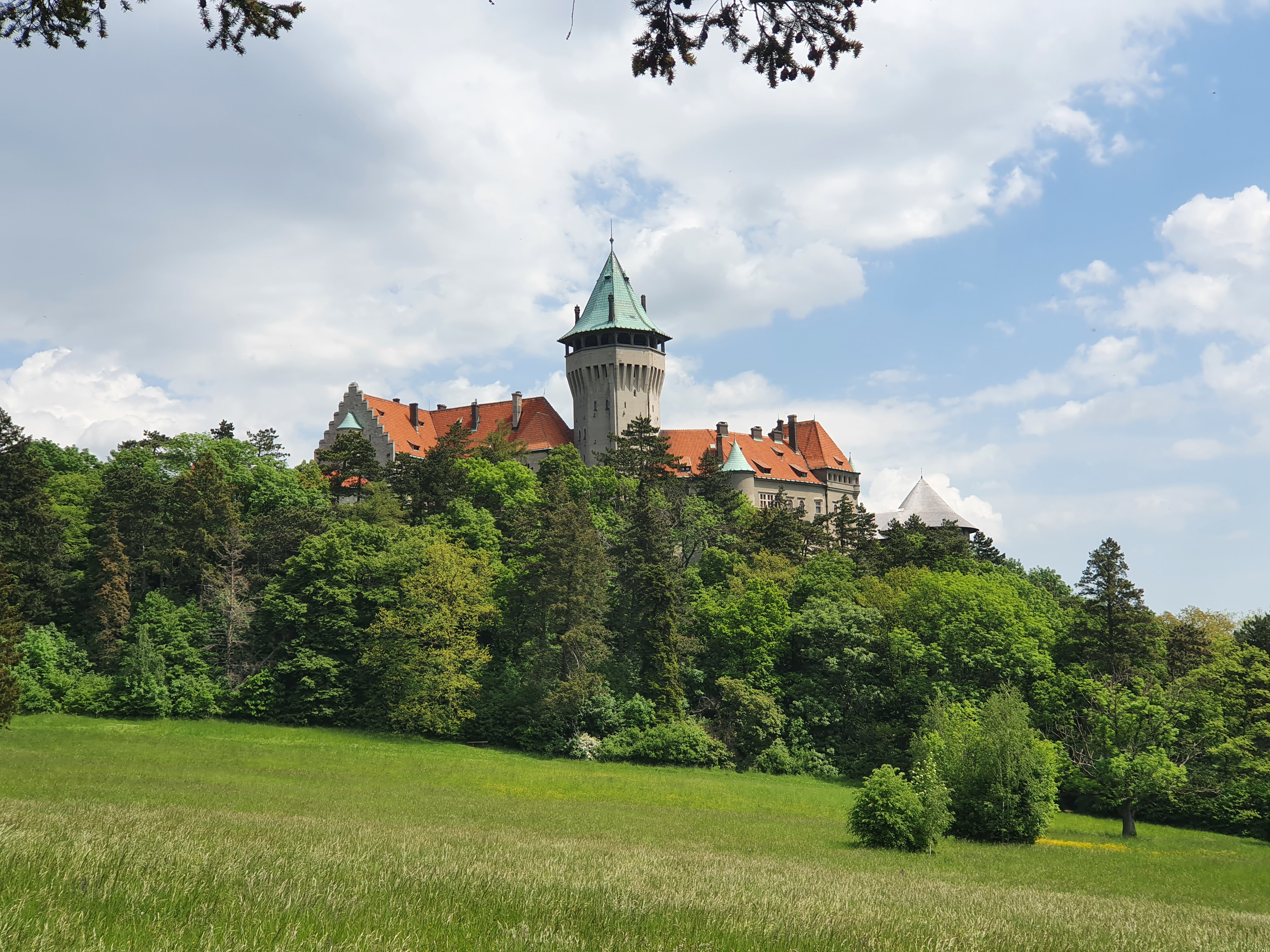

- Flag Coat of arms

- Country: Slovakia
- Capital: Trnava

Government
  - Body: Regional Council
  - Governor: Jozef Viskupič (PS)

Area
  - Total: 4,146.28 km^{2} (1,600.89 sq mi)
- Highest elevation: 767 m (2,516 ft)
- Lowest elevation: 110 m (360 ft)

Population (2025)
  - Total: 565,462

GDP
  - Total: €9.134 billion (2016)
  - Per capita: €16,298 (2016)
- Time zone: UTC+1 (CET)
  - Summer (DST): UTC+2 (CEST)
- ISO 3166 code: SK-TA
- Website: trnava-vuc.sk

The Trnava Region (Slovak: Trnavský kraj, pronounced [ˈtr̩nawskiː ˈkraj]; Hungarian: Nagyszombati kerület; German: Tyrnauer Landschaftsverband) is one of the eight Slovak administrative regions. It was established in 1996, before which date, most of its districts were parts of Bratislava Region which was established on the founding of Czechoslovakia in 1923. It consists of 251 municipalities, from which 16 have a town status. It is the second most densely populated region in Slovakia.

== Geography ==
In the lower, west part of Slovakia, the Trnava region forms a territorial band between the Bratislava Region and the rest of Slovakia, between Austrian and Czech borders in the north and north-west and the Hungarian border in the south. The part north of the Little Carpathians is part of the Záhorie Lowland, with its two subdivisions: hilly Chvojnická pahorkatina and flat Borská nížina. In addition to these, the Myjava Hills and the White Carpathians reach into the area. The fertile Danubian Lowland is located south of the Little Carpathians, again with two subdivisions: the Danubian Flat in the south, containing river island of Žitný ostrov (Rye Island) and the Danubian Hills in the north, where it also borders the Považský Inovec range app. on the line Hlohovec - Piešťany - border with the Trenčín Region. Major rivers are the Danube on the Hungarian border, with part of the Gabčíkovo Dam, Little Danube, which creates with Danube the island of Žitný ostrov, Váh in the east, Dudváh in the centre, and Morava River in the north-west, along the Austrian and Czech borders. The region borders: Austrian Lower Austria and Czech South Moravian Region in the north-west, Trenčín Region in the north, Nitra Region in the east, Hungarian Győr-Moson-Sopron county in the south and Bratislava Region in the west.

== Population ==
Historical population
Year	Pop.	±%
1970	485,316	—
1980	526,906	+8.6%
1991	541,992	+2.9%
2001	551,003	+1.7%
2011	554,741	+0.7%
2021	566,008	+2.0%
Source: Censuses

Population statistic (10 years)
Year	1995	2005	2015	2025
Count	547,967	554,172	559,697	565,462
Difference		+1.13%	+0.99%	+1.03%

Population statistic
Year	2024	2025
Count	565,900	565,462
Difference		−0.07%

It has a population of 565,462 people (31 December 2025).

In terms of population, the region is smallest of all Slovak regions. However, the population density is 136.37/km^{2} (353.2/sq mi) (2025), that is more than Slovak average (110 per km^{2}). Largest towns are Trnava, Piešťany, Hlohovec, Dunajská Streda and Sereď.

=== Ethnicity ===
Census 2021 (1+%)
Ethnicity	Number	Fraction
Slovak	418,409	73.92%
Hungarian	120,338	21.26%
Not found out	31,020	5.48%
Total	566,008	

In year 2021 was 566,008 people by ethnicity 418,409 as Slovak, 120,338 as Hungarian, 31,020 as Not found out, 5027 as Czech, 4051 as Romani, 1845 as Other, 805 as Russian, 734 as Ukrainian, 565 as German, 510 as Rusyn, 382 as Vietnamese, 352 as Serbian, 343 as Romanian, 316 as Polish, 249 as Moravian, 228 as Italian, 166 as Jewish, 150 as Austrian, 147 as Croatian, 147 as English, 134 as Bulgarian, 107 as French, 65 as Albanian, 64 as Chinese, 50 as Greek, 45 as Turkish, 35 as Korean, 33 as Irish, 32 as Canadian, 26 as Silesian and 17 as Iranian.

Note on population: The difference values of population numbers in the table "Population statistic" and in the sections "Ethnicity" & "Religion" is caused by the use of various statistical methods.

=== Religion ===
Census 2021 (1+%)
Religion	Number	Fraction
Roman Catholic Church	347,359	61.37%
None	139,743	24.69%
Not found out	34,081	6.02%
Evangelical Church	19,302	3.41%
Calvinist Church	9662	1.71%
Total	566,008	

In year 2021 was 566,008 people by religion 347,359 from Roman Catholic Church, 139,743 from None, 34,081 from Not found out, 19,302 from Evangelical Church, 9662 from Calvinist Church, 3562 from Greek Catholic Church, 2335 from Christian Congregations in Slovakia, 1586 from Ad hoc movements, 1528 from Other, 1196 from Eastern Orthodox Church, 1048 from Jehovah's Witnesses, 1017 from Other and not ascertained christian church, 745 from Buddhism, 481 from Apostolic Church, 439 from United Methodist Church, 432 from Islam, 425 from Paganism and natural spirituality, 222 from Old Catholic Church, 210 from Jewish community, 160 from Seventh-day Adventist Church, 136 from Baptists Church, 111 from Church of the Brethren, 100 from Hinduism, 60 from Czechoslovak Hussite Church, 36 from Church of Jesus Christ of Latter-day Saints, 23 from Bahá'i Community and 9 from New Apostolic Church.

== Economy ==
The region is quite productive in both industry and agriculture. The proximity to the capital city of Bratislava is an asset, as many Trnava residents travel daily to work there. Lately, multinational manufacturing companies such as Peugeot or Samsung, Schäffler, ZF Slovakia, Vaillant Industrial and Bekaert settled in the region.

== Politics ==
The current governor of the Trnava region is Jozef Viskupič (PS). He won with 54 % of the vote. In the 2017 elections to the regional parliament the results were as follows:

Regional Council of Trnava region

Type
- Type: Unicameral
- Houses: County Council

Leadership
- Governor: Jozef Viskupič, PS

Structure
- Seats: 40
- Political groups: Alliance (14) Independent group (8) Centre-right group (8) Mayors and specialists (5) Piešťany group (5)

Elections
- Last election: 29 October 2022

Meeting place
- Trnava

Website
- County Council of Trnava region

== Administrative division ==
The Trnava Region consists of 7 districts: Dunajská Streda, Galanta, Hlohovec, Piešťany, Senica, Skalica and Trnava. There are 251 municipalities in the region of which 16 are towns.

District	Area [km^{2}]	Population
Dunajská Streda	1074.58	128,458
Galanta	641.70	95,106
Hlohovec	267.22	42,519
Piešťany	381.12	61,476
Senica	683.26	58,584
Skalica	357.07	46,440
Trnava	741.30	132,879

Population and area values are current for year 2025.

== Places of interest ==
- Trnava with City Tower, Saint Nicolas Church, city walls, Saint John the Baptist Cathedral, etc.
- Skalica with its historical centre
- Holíč and its castle
- Church of Saint Margaret of Antioch in Kopčany
- Šaštín-Stráže basilica
- Piešťany - spa town
- Galanta neogothic chateau
- Water wheel mills on Little Danube river in: Jelka, Dunajský Klátov, Tomášikovo, etc.
- Smolenice Castle
- Driny cave
- Little Carpathians Protected Landscape Area
- Dunajské luhy Protected Landscape Area

== Photo gallery ==
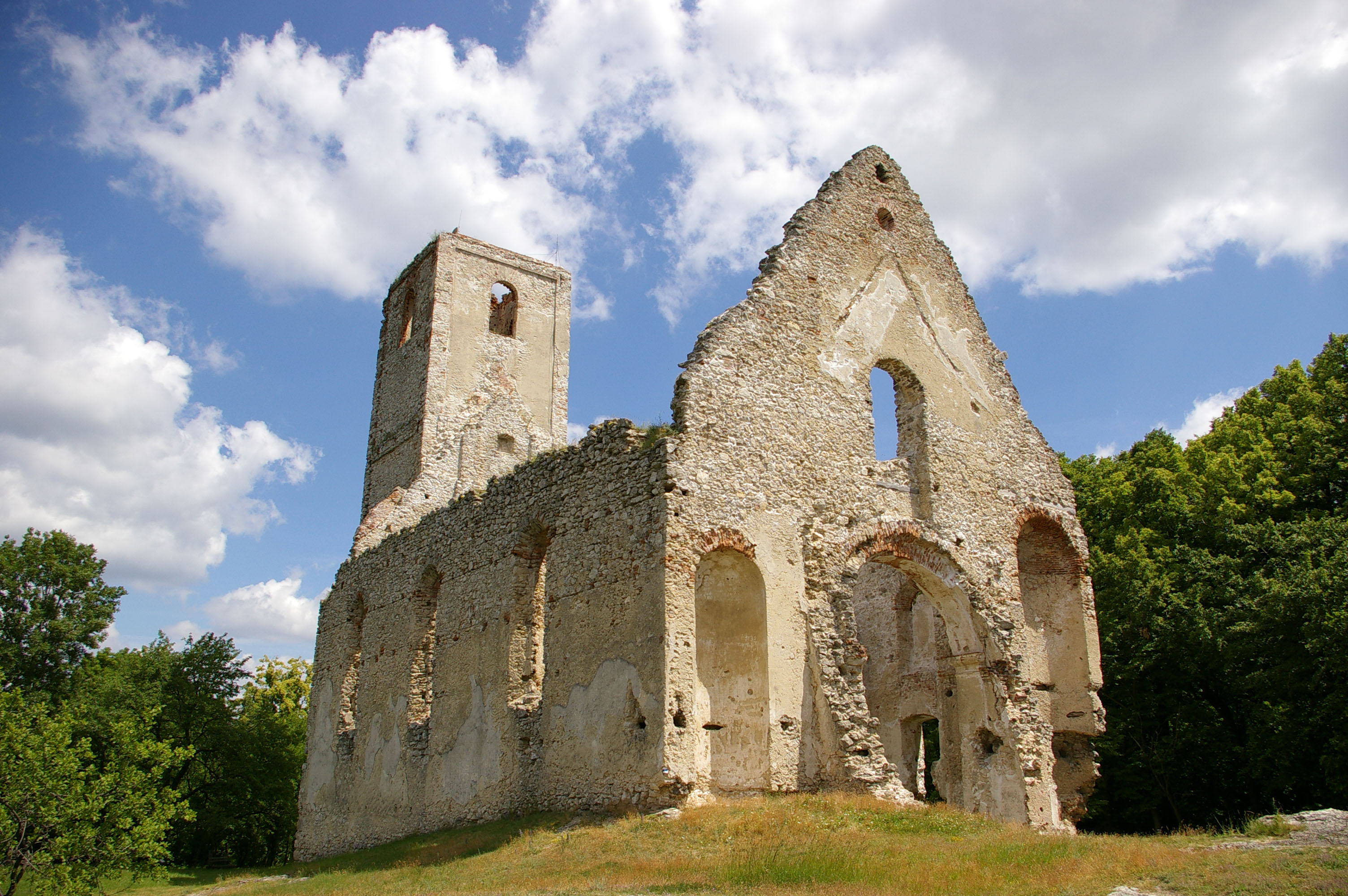
Katarínka monastery

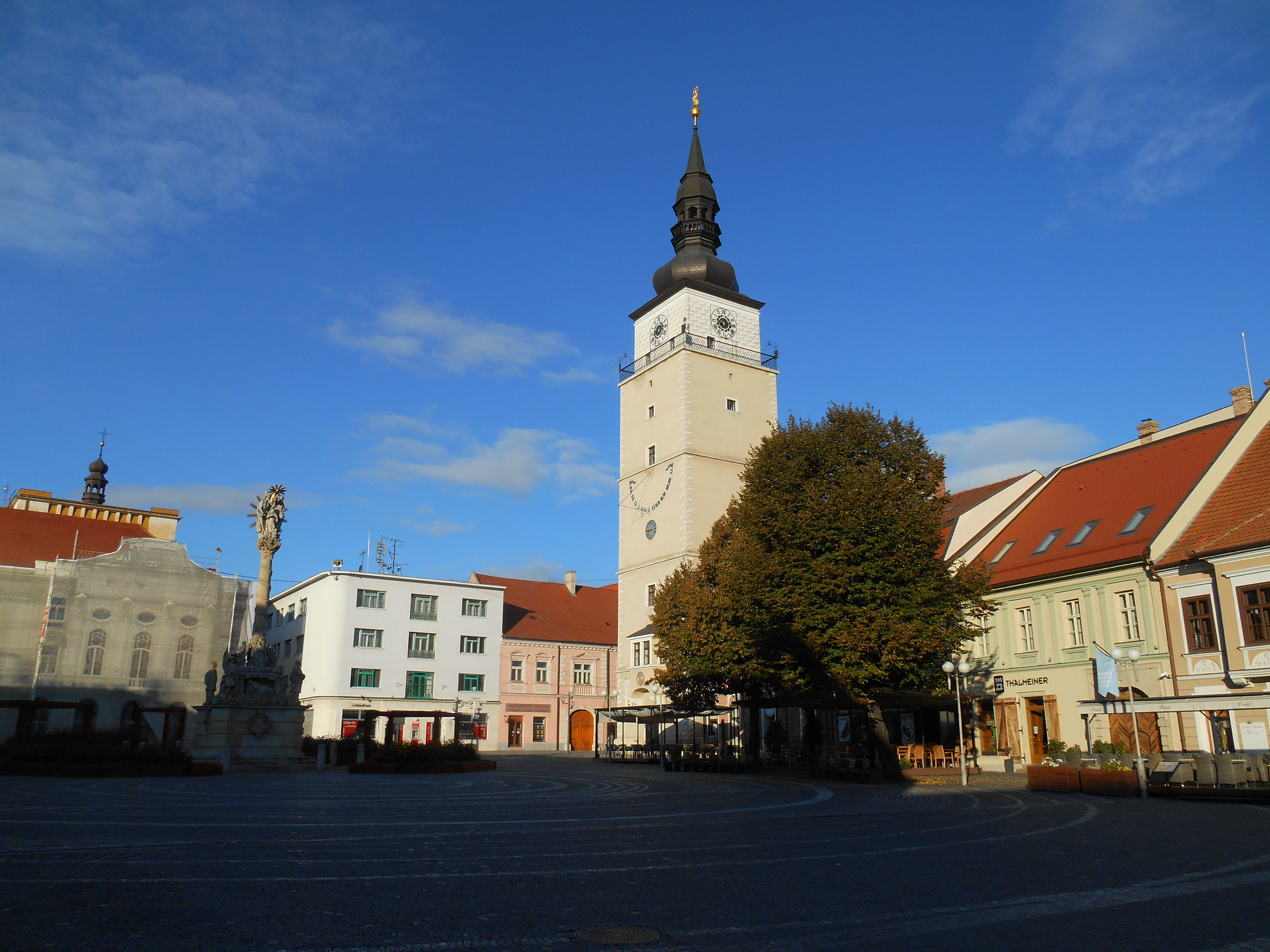
Trnava

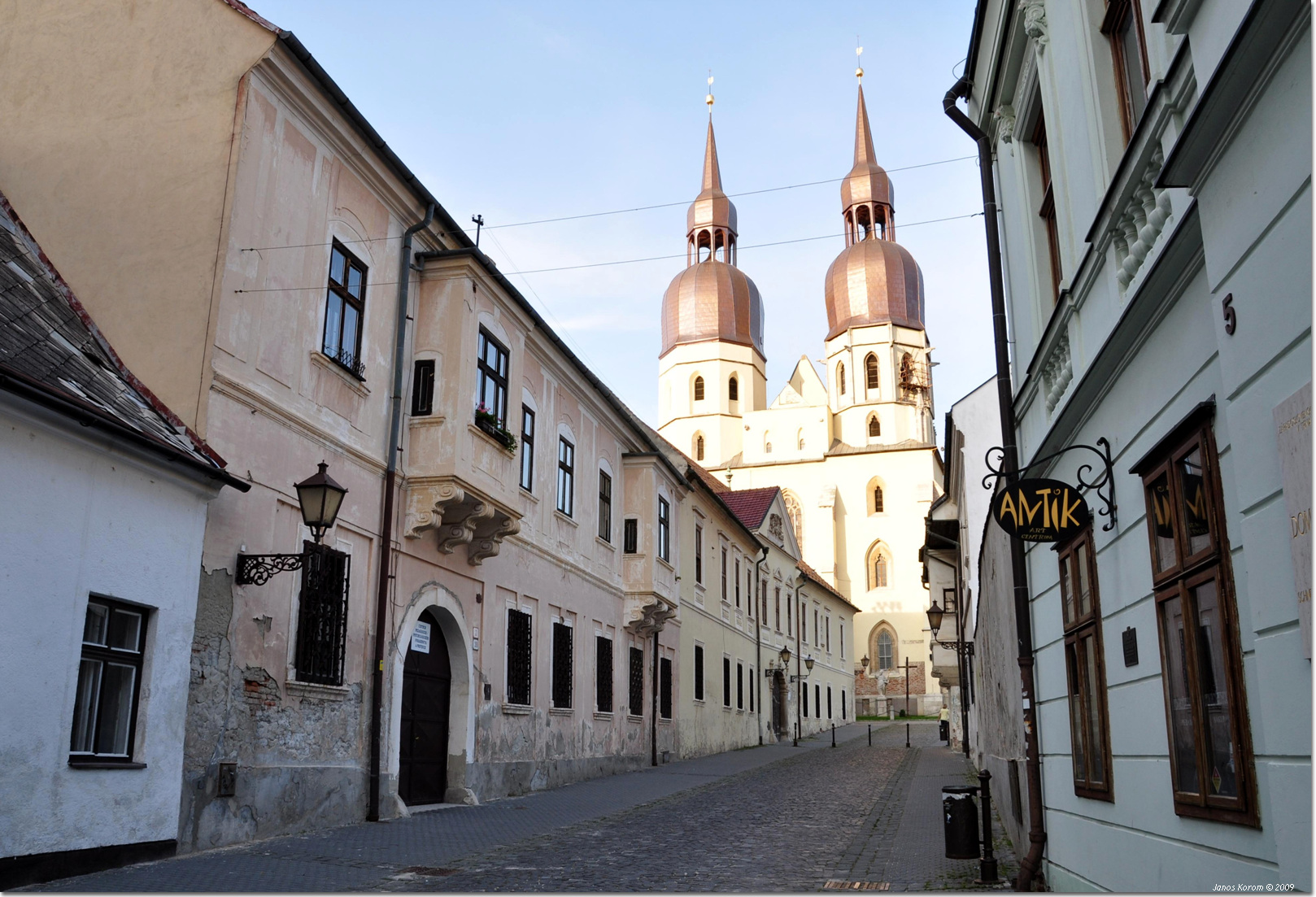
Saint Nicolas Church, Trnava

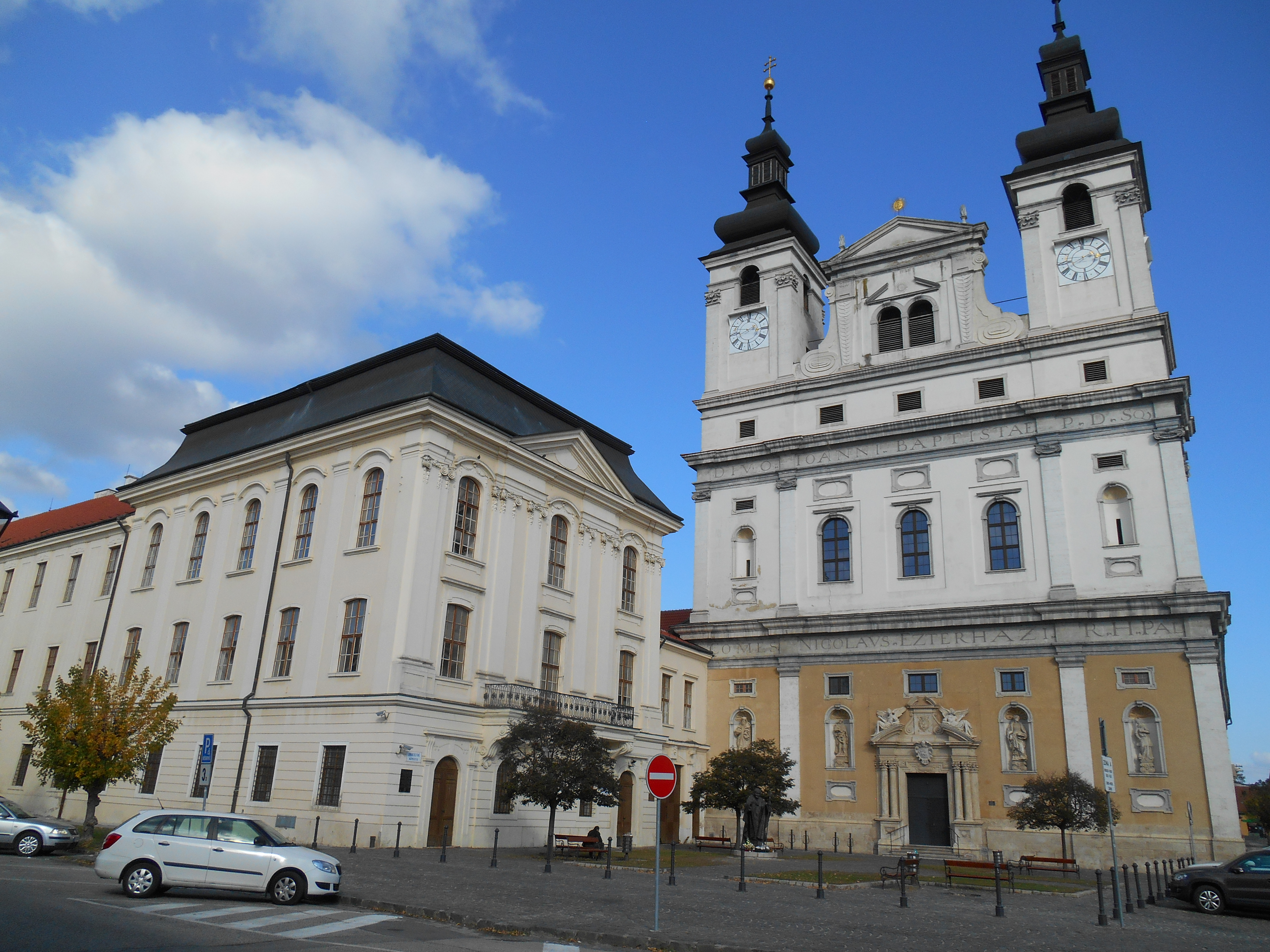
Saint John the Baptist Cathedral, Trnava

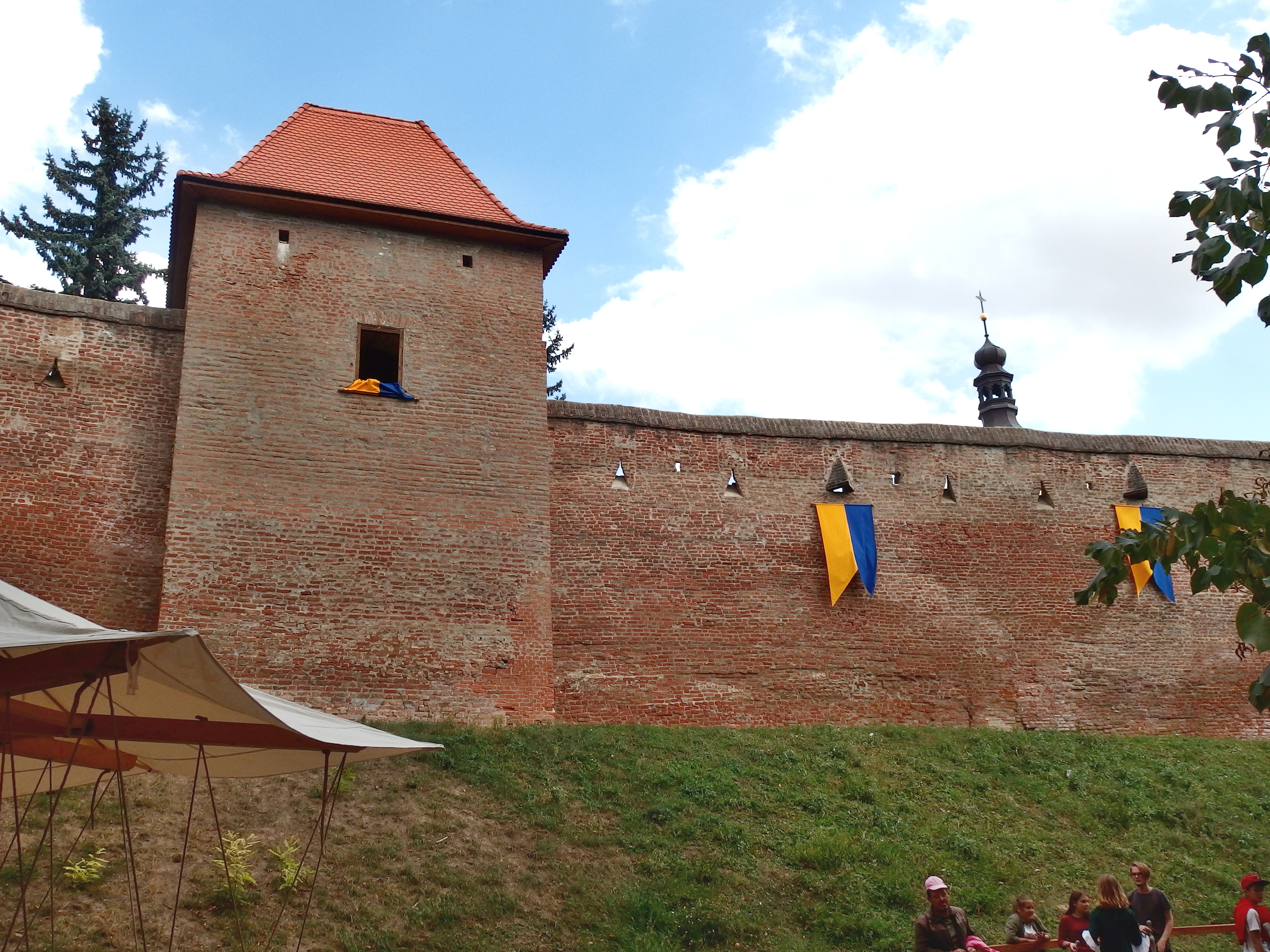
City walls, Trnava

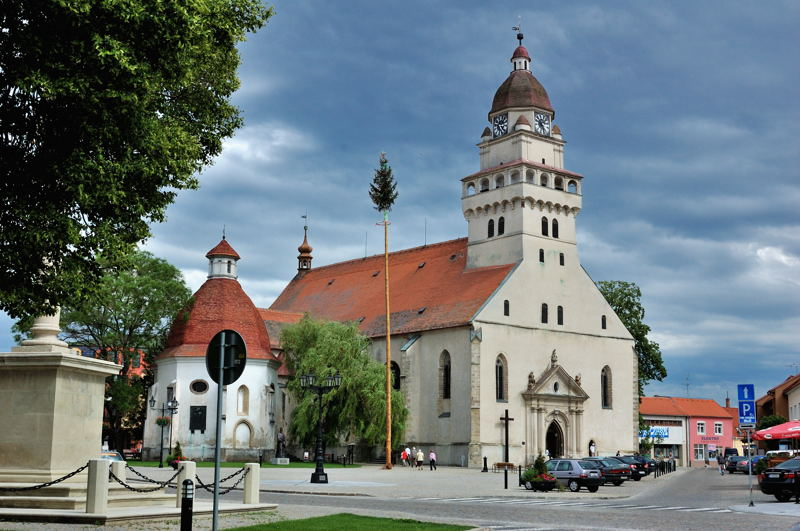
Skalica

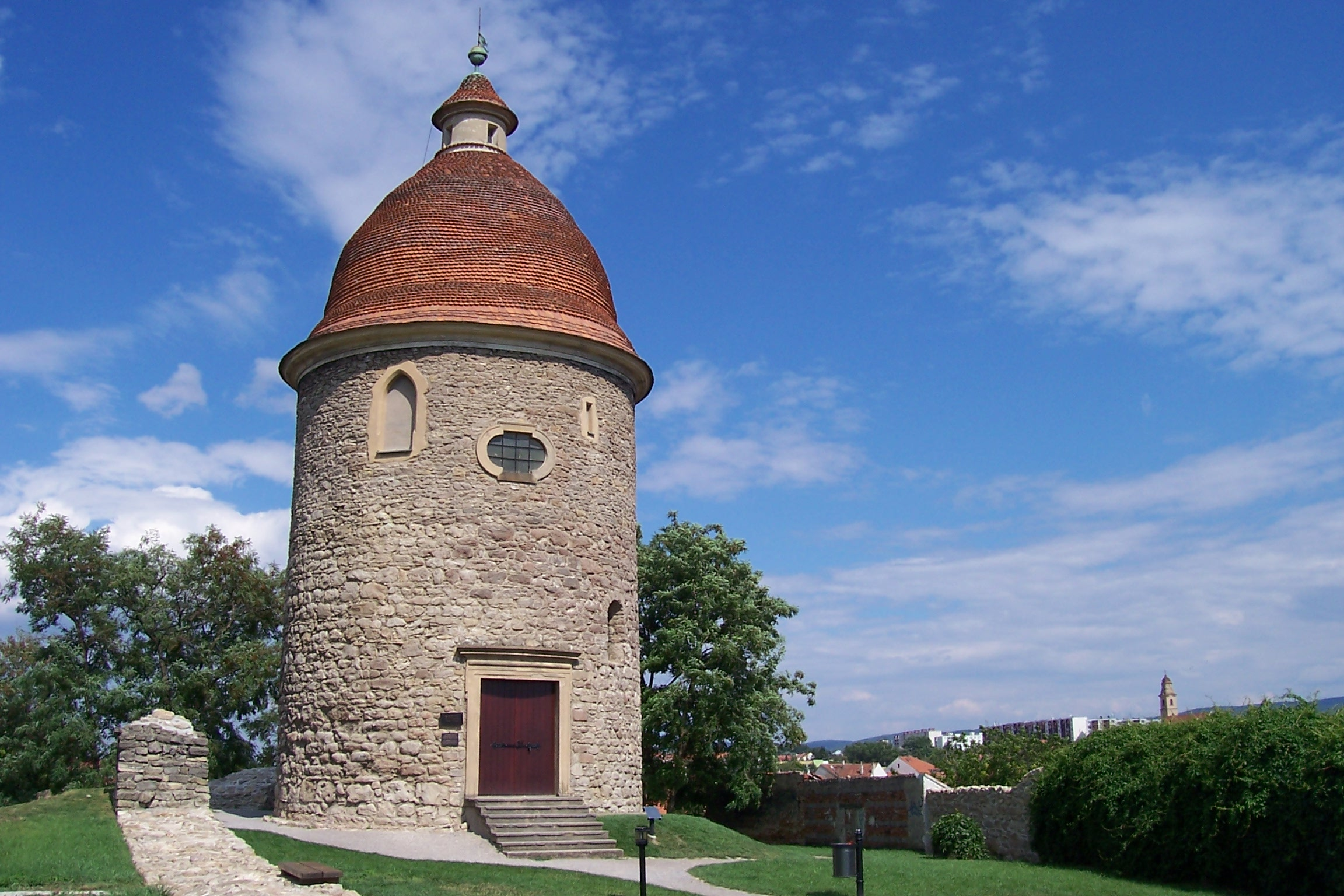
Rotunda in Skalica

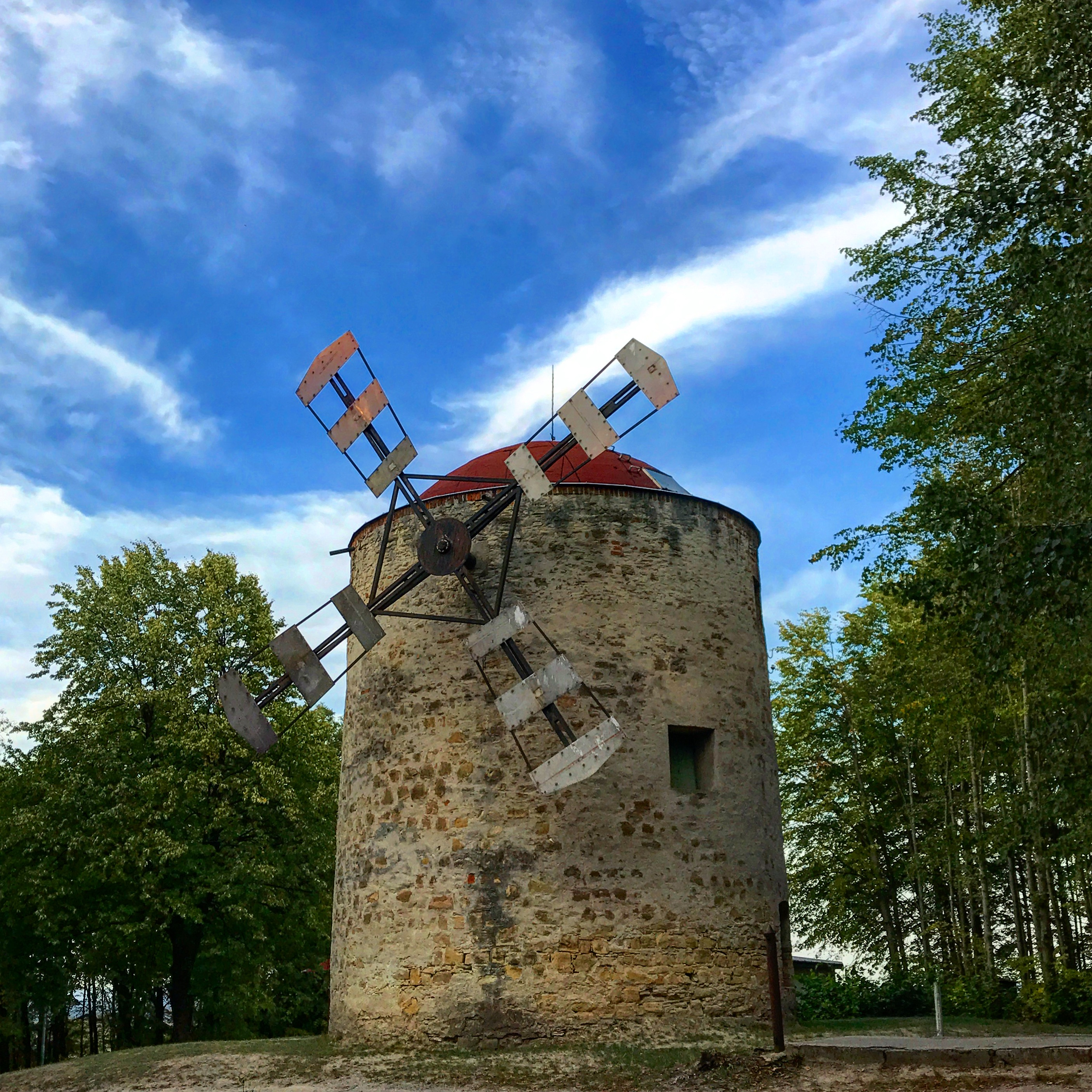
Holíč mill

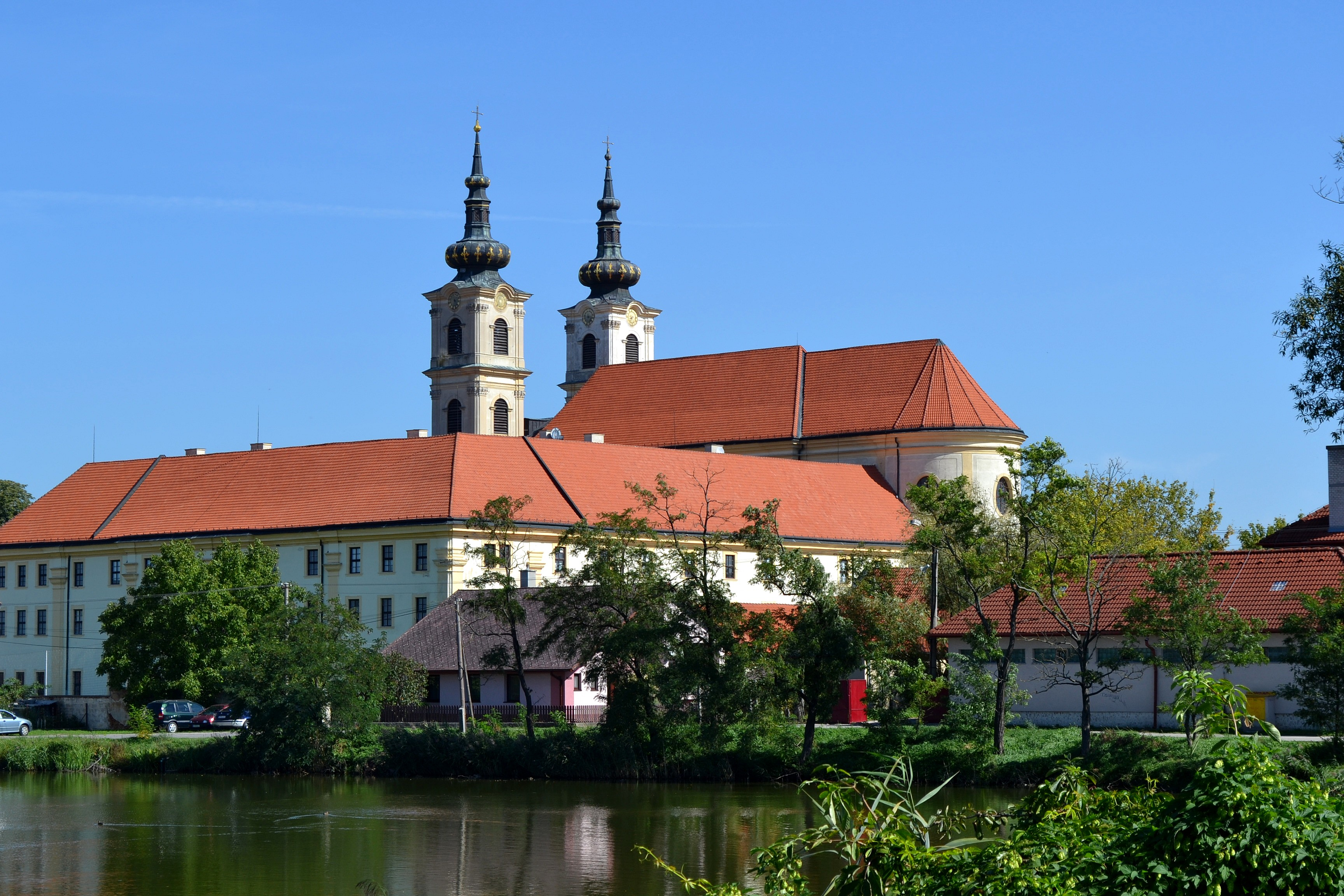
Šaštín-Stráže basilica

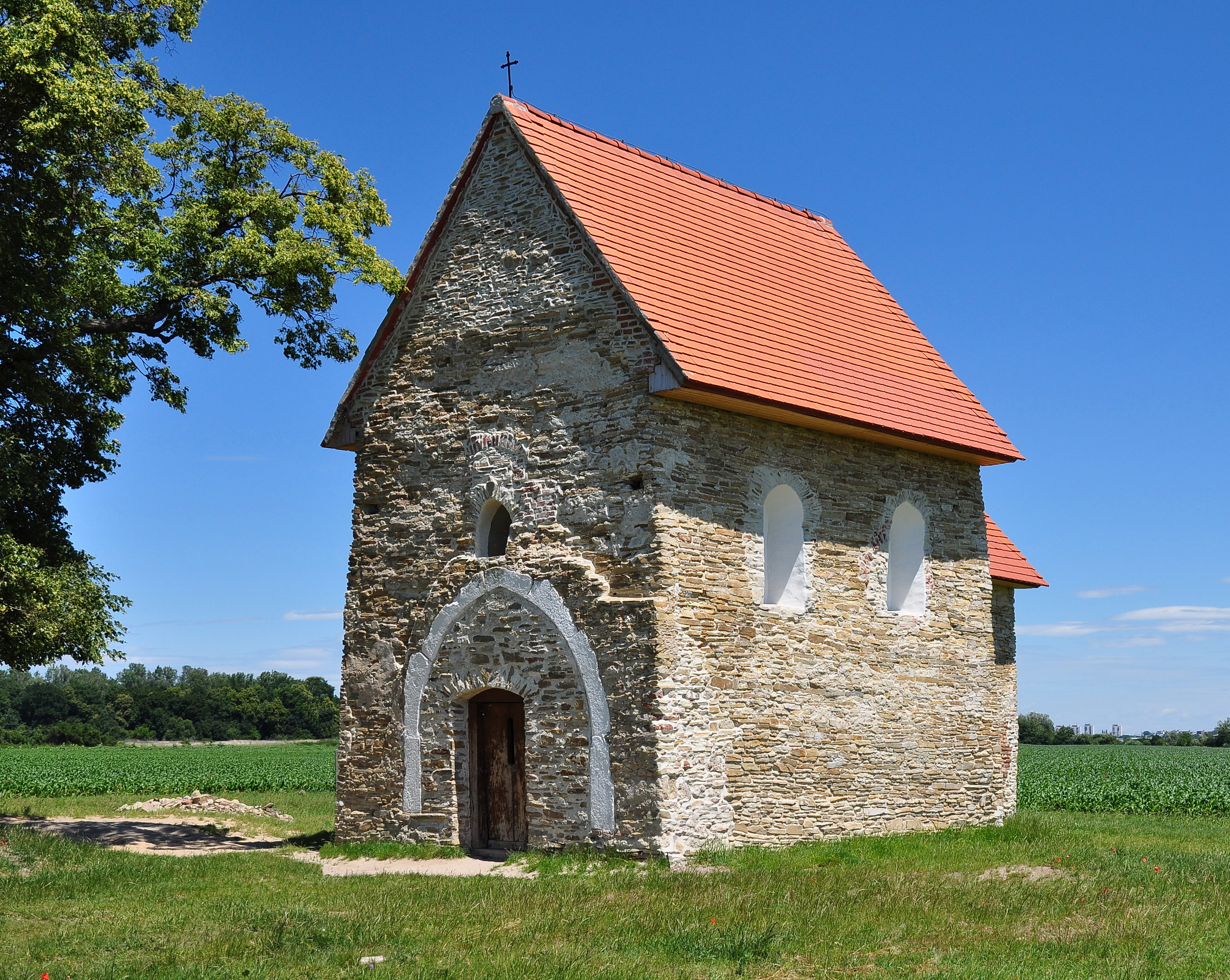
Kopčany

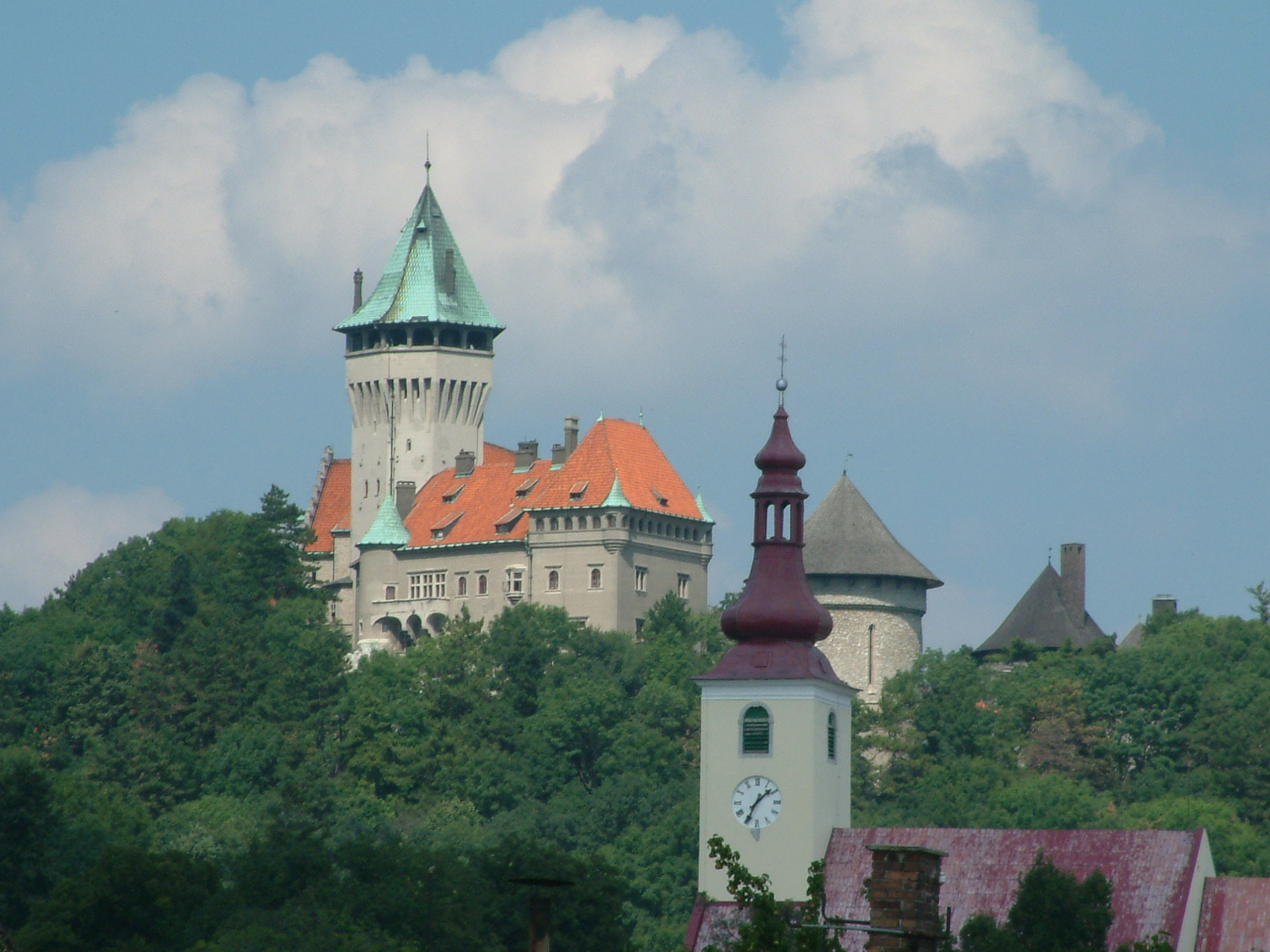
Smolenice Castle

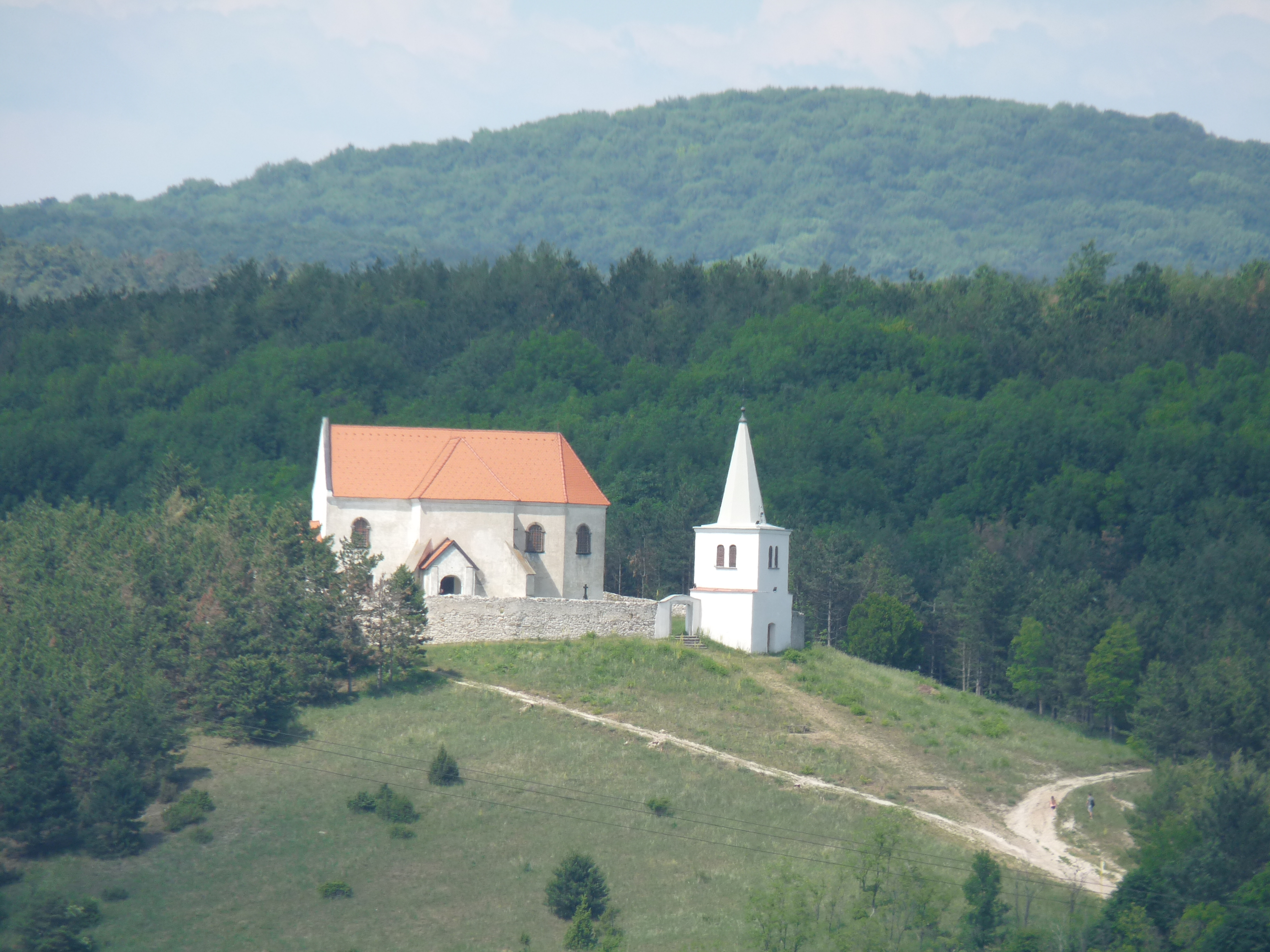
Kočín-Lančár church

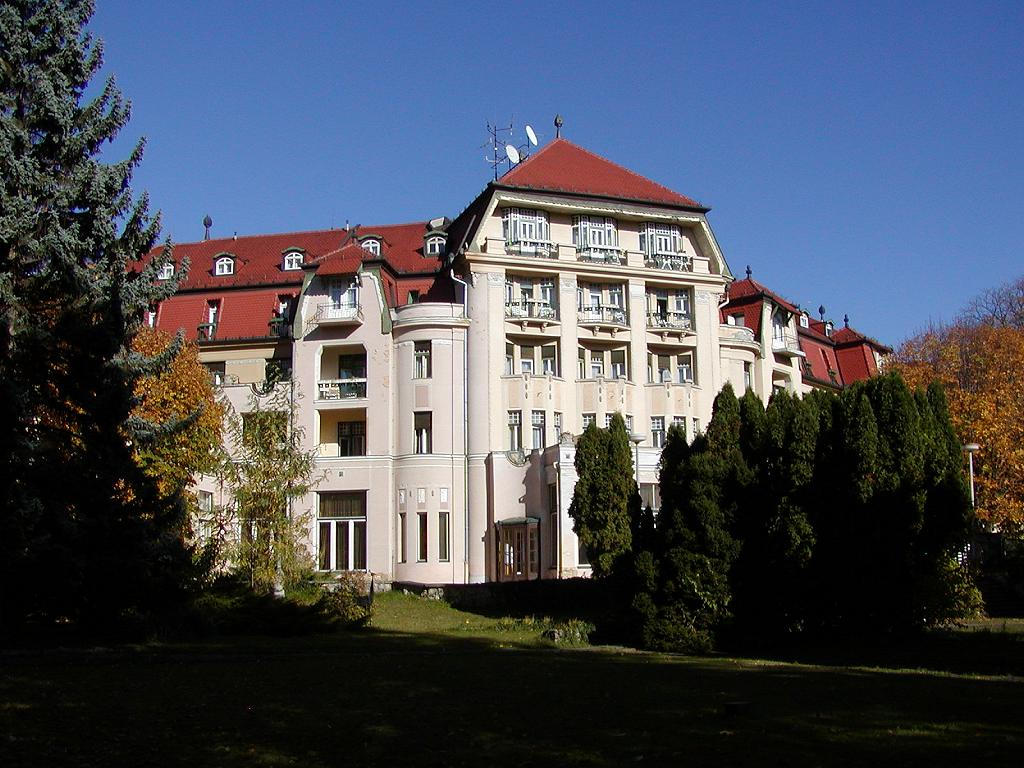
Piešťany

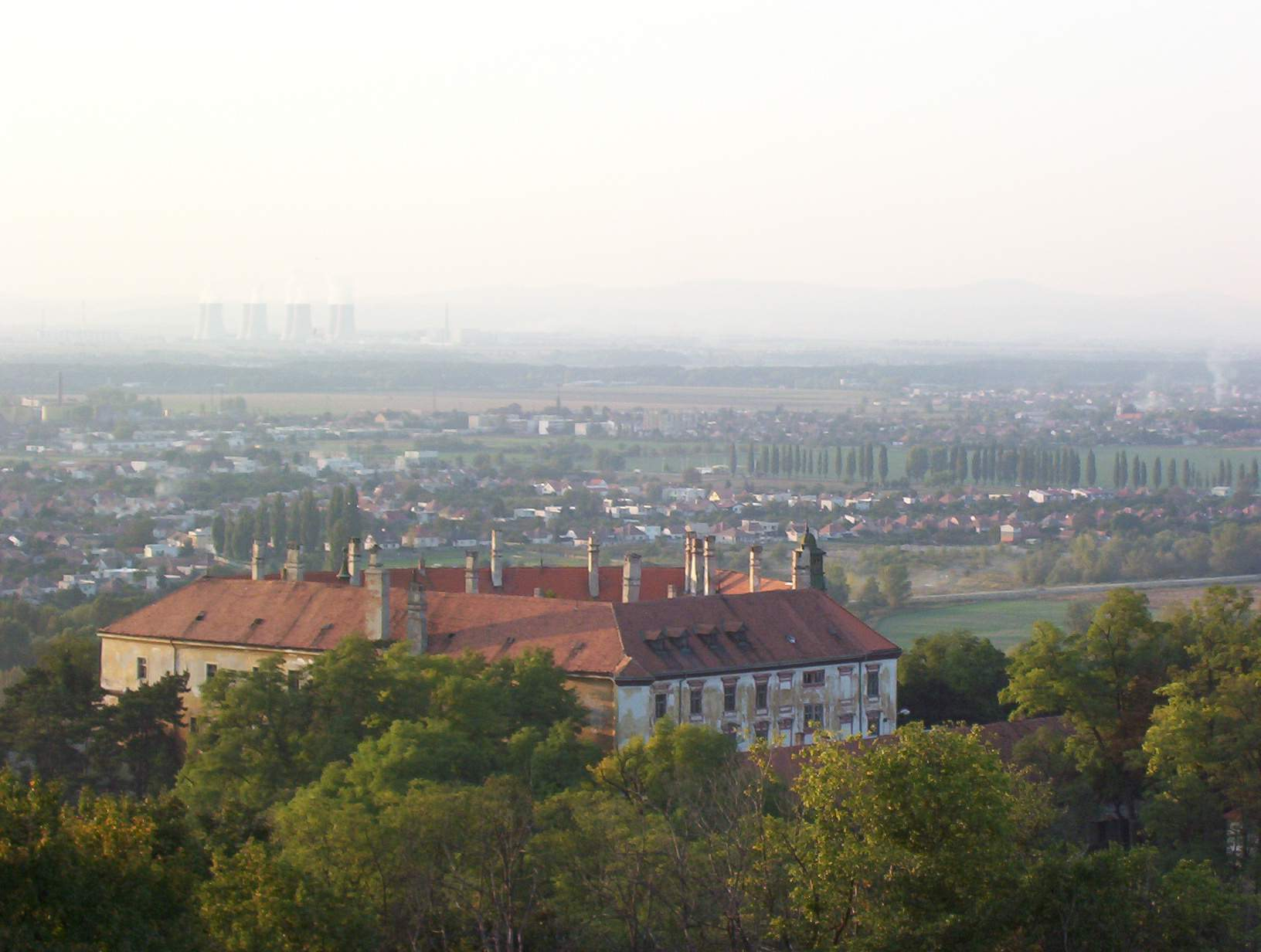
Hlohovec

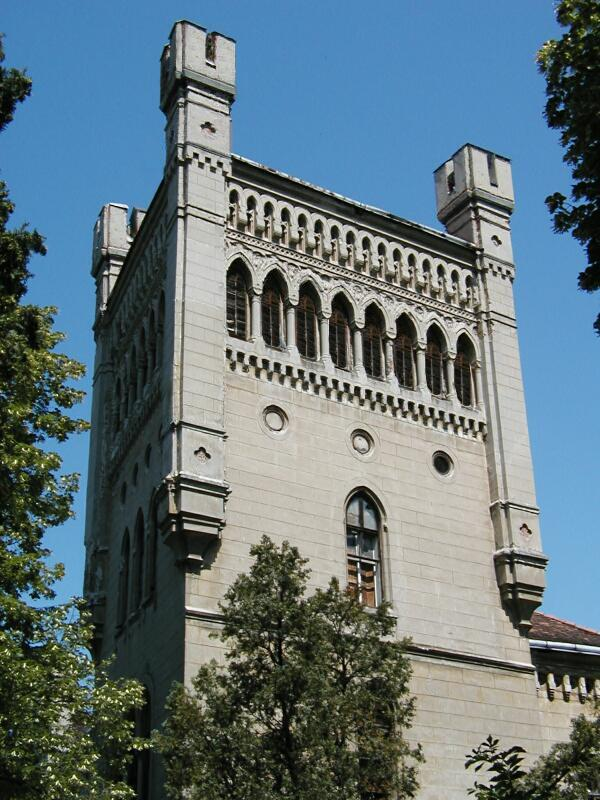
Galanta chateau

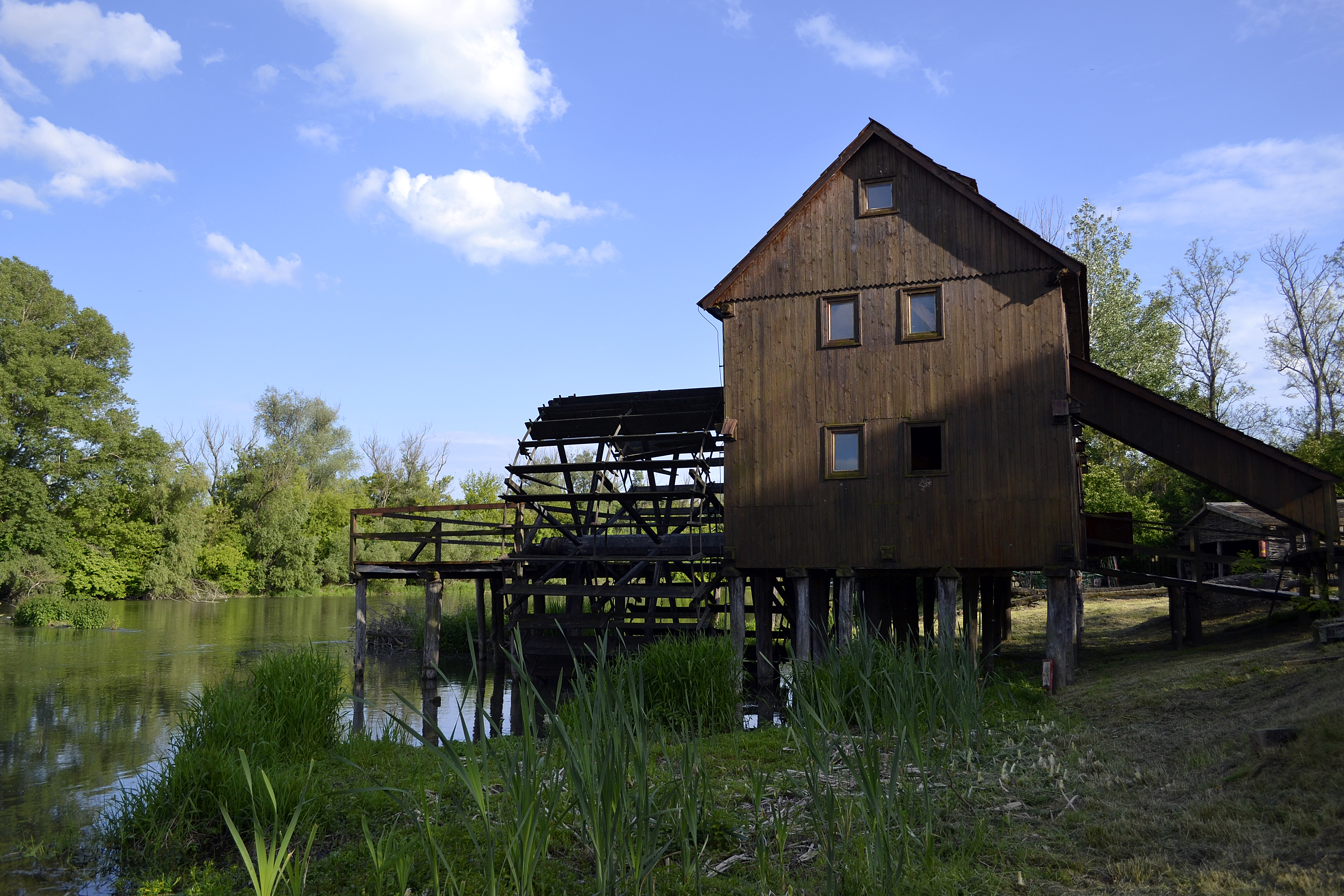
Water wheel mill in Jelka

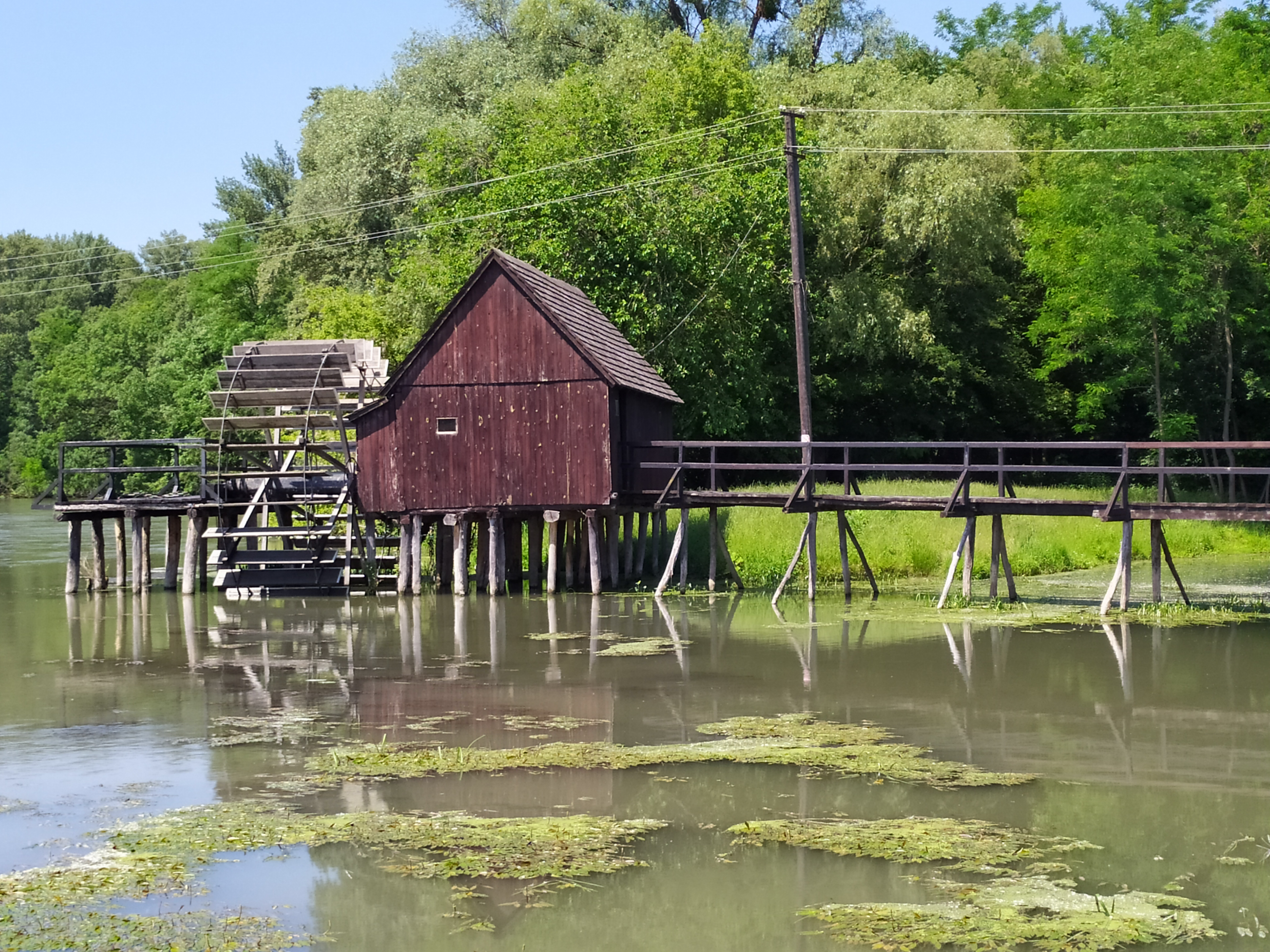
Water wheel mill in Tomášikovo

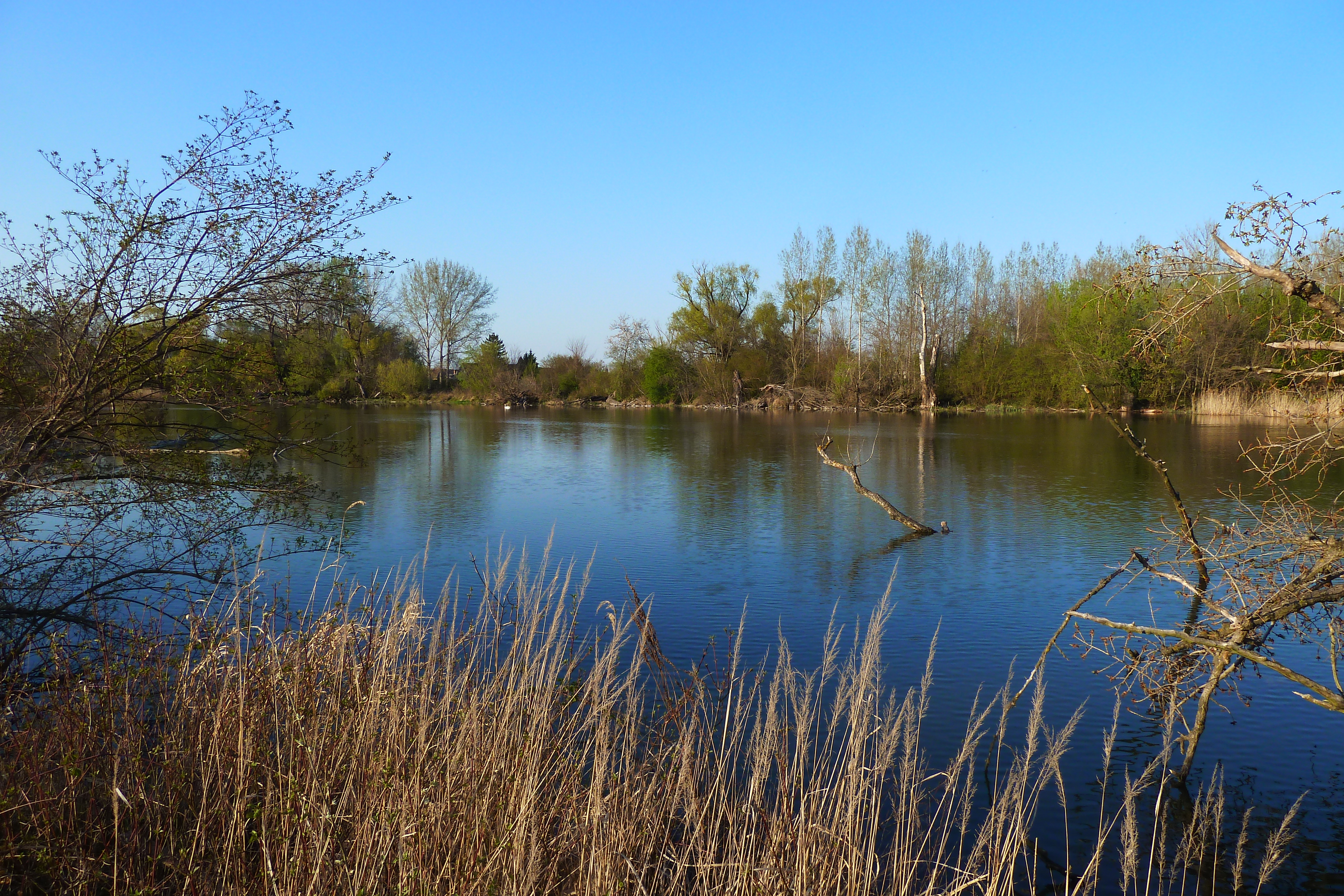
Dunajské luhy Protected Landscape Area

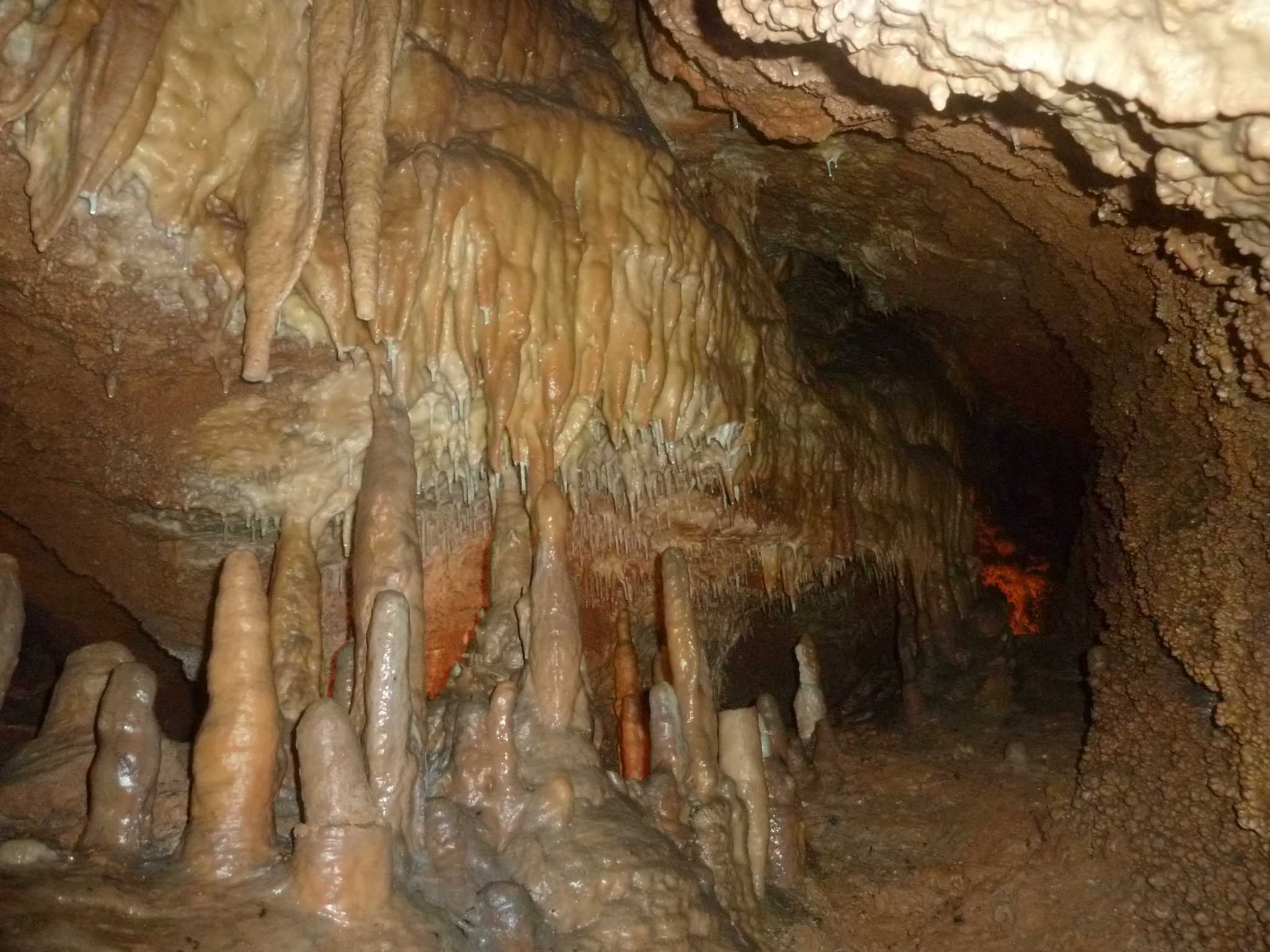
Driny cave

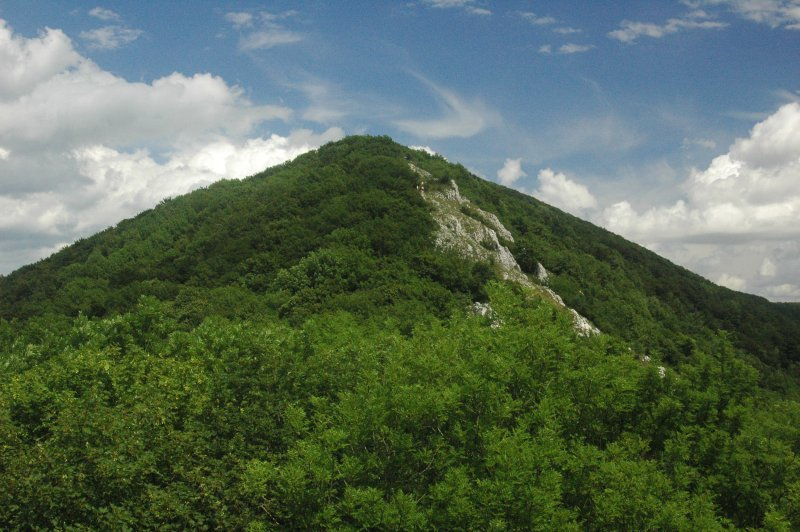
Little Carpathians Protected Landscape Area

== See also ==
- List of municipalities and towns in Slovakia

== Genealogical resources ==
The records for genealogical research are available at the state archive "Statny Archiv in Bratislava, Slovakia"

- Lutheran church records (births/marriages/deaths): 1701-1896 (parish B)
