= Danubian Plain =

Danubian Plain can be a translation of:

- the approximate Serbian name (Podunavska nizija, literally: "Danubian Lowland") for the Serbian part of the Pannonian Plain
- the Serbian (Podunavska nizija) and Hungarian (Dunamenti síkság, literally: "Danubian Lowland") name for a part of the Great Alföld
- the Slovak name (Podunajská nížina, literally: "Danubian Lowland") for the Slovak part of the Little Alföld, see Danubian Lowland
- the Slovak name (Podunajská rovina, literally: "Danubian Flat/Plain") for a part of the Podunajská nížina, see Danubian Flat
- the Bulgarian name (Dunavska ravnina, literally: "Danubian Plain") and Romanian name (Câmpia Dunării) for a group of plains and lowlands in Romania, Bulgaria, and Serbia, see Danubian Plain and Wallachian Plain
