= Dunajský Klátov =

Dunajský Klátov Dunatőkés
- Municipality
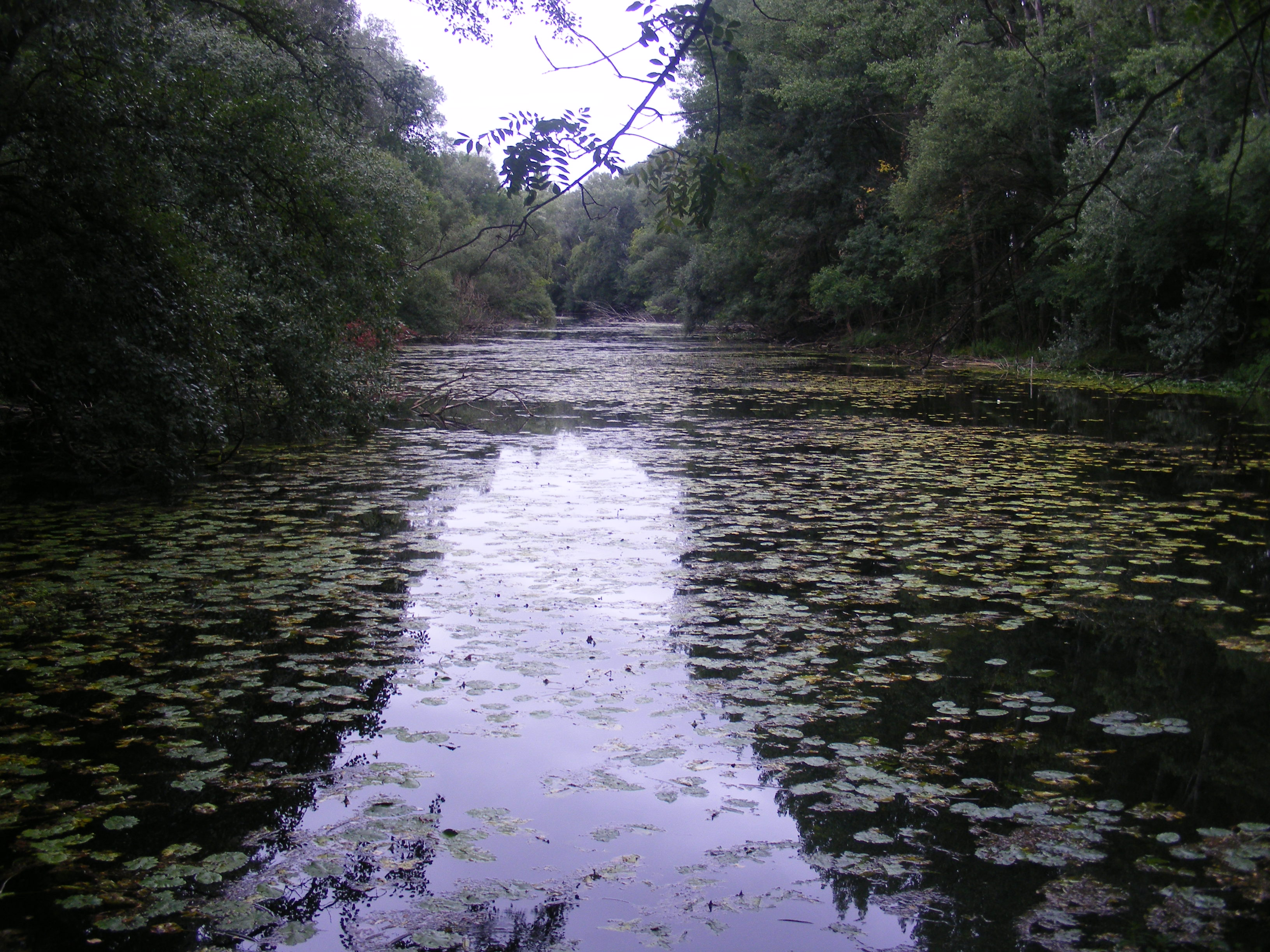
- Little Danube in the village

- Flag

- Location of Dunajský Klátov in the Trnava Region Location of Dunajský Klátov in Slovakia
- Coordinates: 48.04°N 17.69°E
- Country: Slovakia
- Region: Trnava Region
- District: Dunajská Streda District
- First mentioned: 1393

Government
  - Mayor: Mária Csiba (Most-Híd)

Area
  - Total: 4.57 km^{2} (1.76 sq mi)
- Elevation: 113 m (371 ft)

Population (2025)
  - Total: 898

Ethnicity
  - Hungarians: 93.91%
  - Slovaks: 5.22%
- Time zone: UTC+1 (CET)
  - Summer (DST): UTC+2 (CEST)
- Postal code: 930 21
- Area code: +421 31
- Vehicle registration plate (until 2022): DS
- Website: www.dunajskyklatov.sk

Dunajský Klátov (Hungarian: Dunatőkés, pronounced [ˈdunɒtøːkeːʃ]) is a village and municipality in the Dunajská Streda District in the Trnava Region of south-west Slovakia.

== Geography ==
The municipality lies at an altitude of 113 metres (371 ft) and covers an area of 4.57 km^{2} (1.76 sq mi) (2025).

== History ==
In the 9th century, the territory of Dunajský Klátov became part of the Kingdom of Hungary. In historical records the village was first mentioned in 1393. After the Austro-Hungarian army disintegrated in November 1918, Czechoslovak troops occupied the area, later acknowledged internationally by the Treaty of Trianon. Between 1938 and 1945 Dunajský Klátov once more became part of Miklós Horthy's Hungary through the First Vienna Award. From 1945 until the Velvet Divorce, it was part of Czechoslovakia. Since then it has been part of Slovakia.

== See also ==
- List of municipalities and towns in Slovakia

== Population ==
Population statistic (10 years)
Year	1995	2005	2015	2025
Count	463	427	566	898
Difference		−7.77%	+32.55%	+58.65%

Population statistic
Year	2024	2025
Count	860	898
Difference		+4.41%

It has a population of 898 people (31 December 2025).

=== Ethnicity ===
Census 2021 (1+ %)
Ethnicity	Number	Fraction
Hungarian	664	86.57%
Slovak	120	15.64%
Not found out	22	2.86%
Total	767	

In year 2021 was 767 people by ethnicity 664 as Hungarian, 120 as Slovak, 22 as Not found out, 6 as Czech, 3 as English, 1 as Romani, 1 as Romanian, 1 as Austrian, 1 as German and 1 as Other.

Note on population: The difference values of population numbers in the table "Population statistic" and in the sections "Ethnicity" & "Religion" is caused by the use of various statistical methods.

=== Religion ===
Census 2021 (1+ %)
Religion	Number	Fraction
Roman Catholic Church	504	65.71%
None	194	25.29%
Calvinist Church	37	4.82%
Greek Catholic Church	9	1.17%
Evangelical Church	8	1.04%
Total	767	

In year 2021 was 767 people by religion 504 from Roman Catholic Church, 194 from None, 37 from Calvinist Church, 9 from Greek Catholic Church, 8 from Evangelical Church, 6 from Not found out, 3 from Christian Congregations in Slovakia, 2 from Other and not ascertained christian church, 2 from Other, 1 from Eastern Orthodox Church and 1 from Paganism and natural spirituality.

== Genealogical resources ==
The records for genealogical research are available at the state archive "Statny Archiv in Bratislava, Slovakia"

- Roman Catholic church records (births/marriages/deaths): 1673-1942 (parish B)
- Lutheran church records (births/marriages/deaths): 1823-1946 (parish B)
- Reformated church records (births/marriages/deaths): 1784-1926 (parish B)
