= Danubian Hills =

Geographical region of Slovakia

Coordinates: 48°15′N 18°15′E

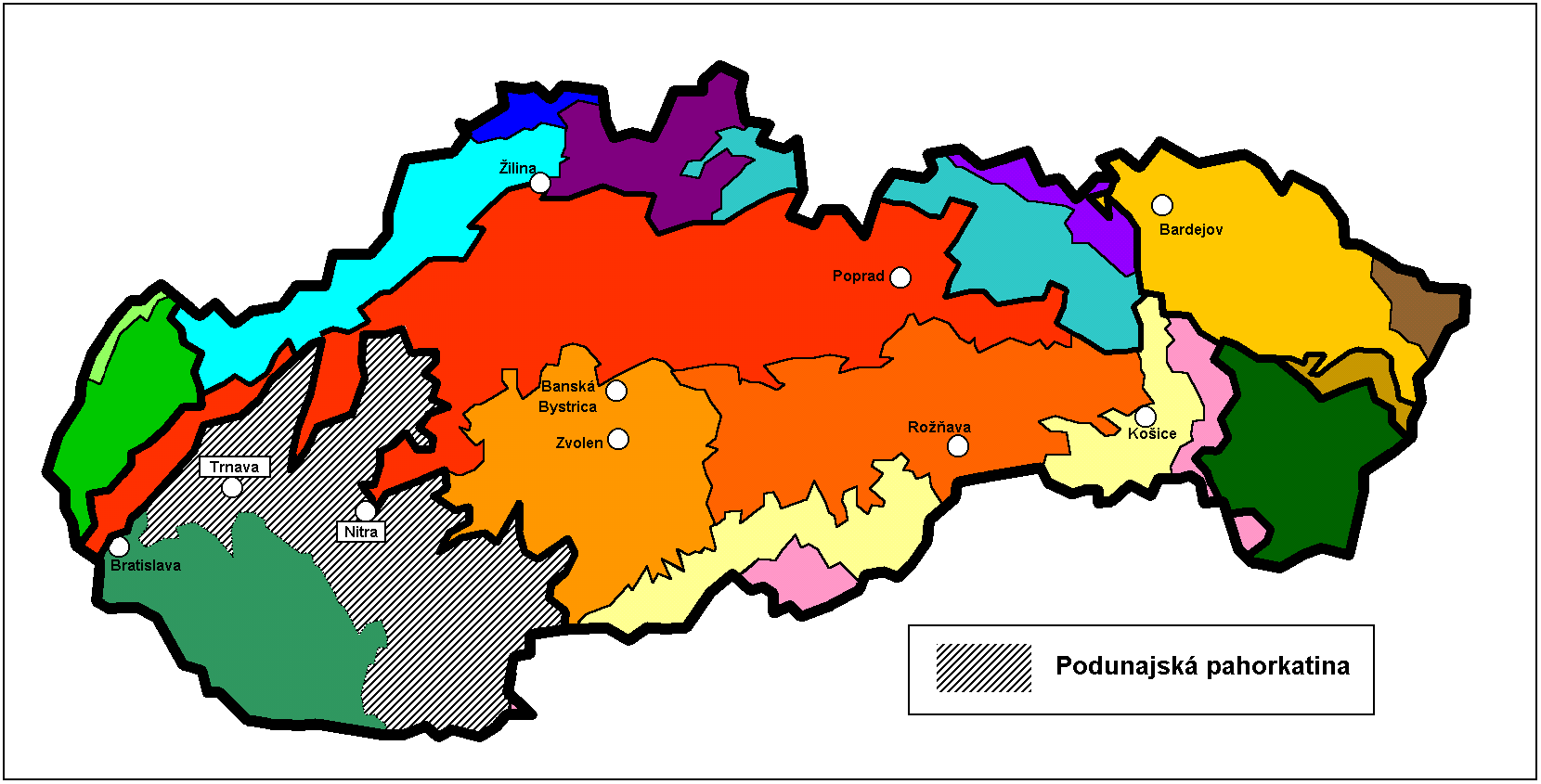
Danubian Hills cover significant part of western Slovakia.

The Danubian Hills (Slovak: Podunajská pahorkatina), also translated as Danubian Upland, is the north-eastern part of the Danubian Lowland in Slovakia, often appearing as low rolling hills of prevalently eolic origin.

== Location ==
It lies between the Danubian Flat and the Danube in the south, the Little Carpathians in the west and all the other Western Carpathians in the north and east. The border with the Danubian Flat runs approximately along the line Bratislava – Senec – Sereď – Nové Zámky – Patince.

== Geology ==
The area has varied rocks (clay, gravel, sands), which are covered by Quaternary sediments (loess) and very fertile soils (black and brown earths).

== Towns ==
Major towns of the area are Trnava, Topoľčany, Nitra, Levice, Dudince and Štúrovo.

== Parts ==
The Váh, Nitra, Žitava, Hron and Ipeľ rivers divide the area into the following 11 geomorphological parts (from the west to the east):

- Trnavská pahorkatina (Trnava Hills)
- Dolnovážska niva (Lower Váh River Plain)
- Nitrianska pahorkatina (Nitra Hills)
- Nitrianska niva (Nitra River Plain)
- Žitavská pahorkatina (Žitava Hills)
- Žitavská niva (Žitava River Plain)
- Hronská pahorkatina (Hron Hills)
- Hronská niva (Hron River Plain)
- Čenkovská niva (Čenkov River Plain)
- Ipeľská pahorkatina (Ipeľ Hills)
- Ipeľská niva (Ipeľ River Plain)

The above-mentioned river plains have rich subterranean reservoirs of water. Other important water deposits include the deposits in Dudince.

The area features many small-scale protected areas. The communities of the marshes are protected e.g. in Parížske močiare ("Paríž Marshes"). Various types of sand prairie or forest prairie vegetation can be found here (Čenkovská step, Chotínske piesky). Also, protected residues or original thermopile oak groves (Dubník, Vŕšok) are situated here.
