= Jelka =

Jelka Jóka
- Municipality
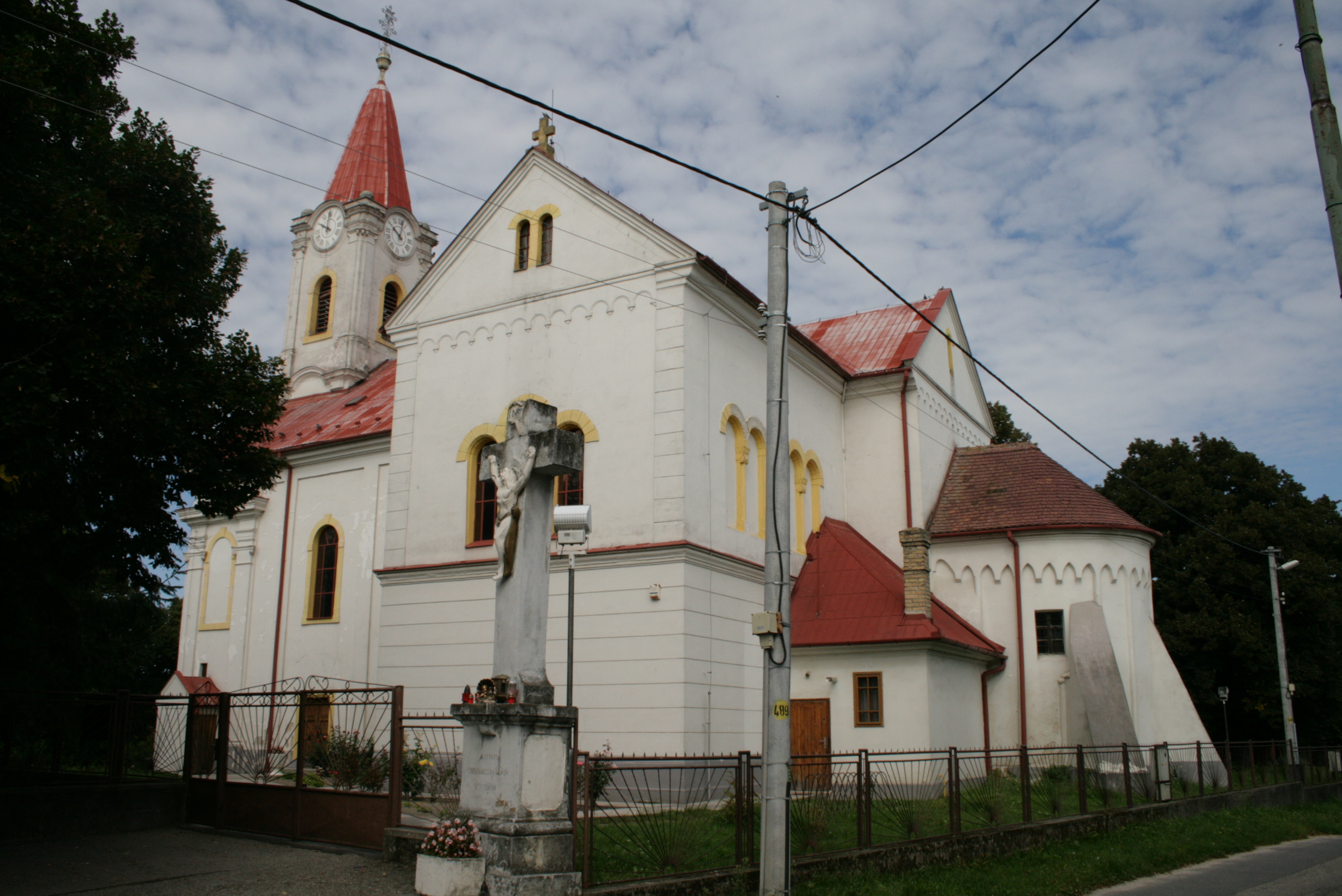
- Church of Saint John the Baptist

- Flag

- Location of Jelka in the Trnava Region Location of Jelka in Slovakia
- Coordinates: 48.14°N 17.50°E
- Country: Slovakia
- Region: Trnava Region
- District: Galanta District
- First mentioned: 1237

Government
  - Mayor: Gabriel Kiš

Area
  - Total: 32.65 km^{2} (12.61 sq mi)
- Elevation: 121 m (397 ft)

Population (2025)
  - Total: 3,998
- Time zone: UTC+1 (CET)
  - Summer (DST): UTC+2 (CEST)
- Postal code: 925 23
- Area code: +421 31
- Vehicle registration plate (until 2022): GA
- Website: jelka.sk

Jelka (Hungarian: Jóka) is a large village and municipality in Galanta District of the Trnava Region of south-west Slovakia.

== Geography ==
The municipality lies at an altitude of 121 metres (397 ft) and covers an area of 32.65 km^{2} (12.61 sq mi) (2025).

== History ==
In the 9th century, the territory of Jelka became part of the Great Moravia, in 11th century part of Kingdom of Hungary. In historical records the village was first mentioned in 1237. Before the establishment of independent Czechoslovakia in 1918, it was part of Pozsony County. After the Austro-Hungarian army disintegrated in November 1918, Czechoslovak troops entered the area following cease-fire agreements with western powers.

Later, newly created independent Hungary acknowledged full Czechoslovak sovereignty in their borders internationally by the Treaty of Trianon, a part of Hungary and Czechoslovakia signed also by France, Britain and USA. Hungarians respected their word until 1938, when, as agreed with Hitler, Jelka once more became part of Miklós Horthy's Hungary through the First Vienna Award. Hungary managed to keep this award until 1945 when Czechoslovak administration restored.

From 1945 until the Velvet Divorce, it was part of Czechoslovakia. Since then it has been part of Slovakia.

== Population ==
Population statistic (10 years)
Year	1995	2005	2015	2025
Count	3723	3947	3925	3998
Difference		+6.01%	−0.55%	+1.85%

Population statistic
Year	2024	2025
Count	3992	3998
Difference		+0.15%

It has a population of 3998 people (31 December 2025).

=== Ethnicity ===
Census 2021 (1+ %)
Ethnicity	Number	Fraction
Hungarian	2128	52.64%
Slovak	1857	45.94%
Not found out	214	5.29%
Romani	90	2.22%
Total	4042	

In year 2021 was 4042 people by ethnicity 2128 as Hungarian, 1857 as Slovak, 214 as Not found out, 90 as Romani, 20 as Czech, 15 as German, 9 as Polish, 7 as Rusyn, 5 as Other, 2 as Serbian, 2 as Russian, 2 as Romanian, 1 as Chinese, 1 as Ukrainian and 1 as Italian.

Note on population: The difference values of population numbers in the table "Population statistic" and in the sections "Ethnicity" & "Religion" is caused by the use of various statistical methods.

=== Religion ===
Census 2021 (1+ %)
Religion	Number	Fraction
Roman Catholic Church	2863	70.83%
None	501	12.39%
Not found out	191	4.73%
Evangelical Church	180	4.45%
Calvinist Church	147	3.64%
Total	4042	

In year 2021 was 4042 people by religion 2863 from Roman Catholic Church, 501 from None, 191 from Not found out, 180 from Evangelical Church, 147 from Calvinist Church, 37 from Greek Catholic Church, 29 from Baptists Church, 23 from Christian Congregations in Slovakia, 18 from Jehovah's Witnesses, 13 from Other and not ascertained christian church, 11 from Eastern Orthodox Church, 6 from Other, 6 from Ad hoc movements, 5 from Old Catholic Church, 5 from United Methodist Church, 3 from Buddhism, 1 from Paganism and natural spirituality, 1 from Seventh-day Adventist Church, 1 from Bahá'i Community and 1 from Apostolic Church.

== Genealogical resources ==
The records for genealogical research are available at the state archive "Statny Archiv in Bratislava, Slovakia"

- Roman Catholic church records (births/marriages/deaths): 1732–1906 (parish A)
- Lutheran church records (births/marriages/deaths): 1701–1896 (parish A)
- Reformated church records (births/marriages/deaths): 1784–1910 (parish A)

== See also ==
- List of municipalities and towns in Slovakia
