= Danubian Flat =

Coordinates: 48°00′N 17°45′E

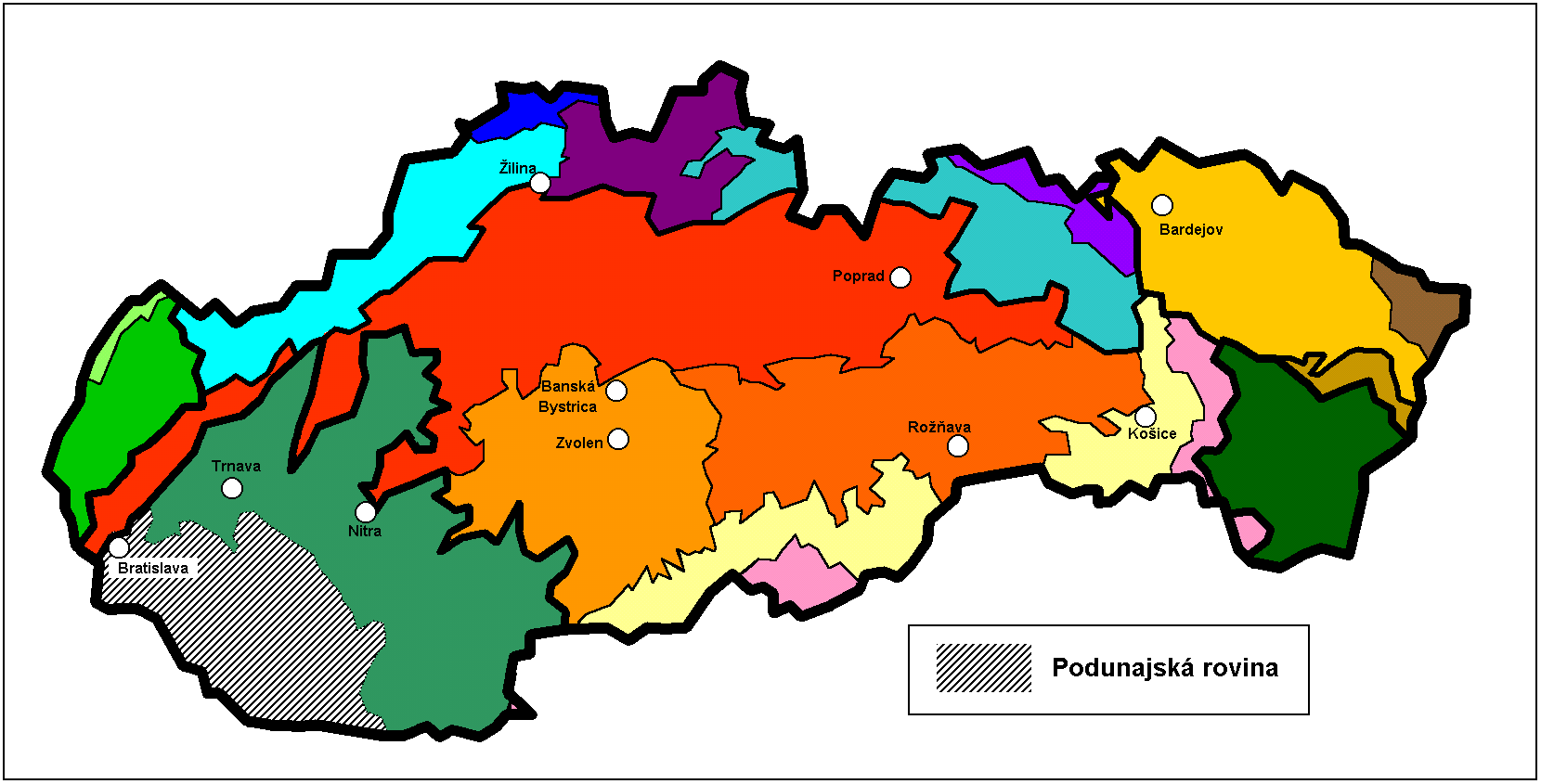
Location of Danubian Flat in Slovakia (in gray)

The Danubian Flat (Slovak and Czech: Podunajská rovina, German: Donauebene), also translated as Danubian Plain, is the south-western, flatter, part of the Danubian Lowland in Slovakia.

The border with the Danubian Hills runs approx. along the line Bratislava – Senec – Sereď – Nové Zámky – Patince.

It has been formed by the arms of the Danube (Little Danube and others) and by the southern Váh, Nitra and Žitava rivers. It is filled with huge layers of gravel from the Danube and other rivers of the area. These Danubian gravels are covered with loess and other very fertile soils.

The Danube forms here a unique continental delta system of meanders and dead arms. The area between one of those arms called Little Danube and the Danube is known as the Žitný ostrov, the biggest river island in Europe. The Žitný ostrov is an area with marsh depressions, natural lakes and artificial lakes. The drainage system of the southern area was (deliberately) significantly changed by the construction of the Gabčíkovo Dam on the Danube. The Žitný ostrov has been a "Protected Water Management Area" since 1978.

The area is rich in forest glades, water and marsh fauna and flora. It has rich subterranean water reservoirs. Those in Žitný ostrov are among the largest in Central Europe. Warm springs can be found in Komárno, Štúrovo and Patince.

The area has the warmest and driest climate in Slovakia. This, and the fact that it has fertile soils, make it the ideal place for agriculture. Wheat, sugar beets, sweet corn, vegetables and tobacco are grown here. Fruit and vine growing are also important.

The most important towns of the area are the Slovak capital Bratislava (the Danube Flat begins in below Bratislava Castle in central Bratislava), Galanta, Sereď, Dunajská Streda, Komárno, and Nové Zámky.

The area features many small-scale protected areas, such as Ostov Kopáč in Bratislava or the Vlčianske mŕtve rameno, Čičovské mŕtve rameno. Protected marshes are for example the unique Šúr area in Svätý Jur. The area of Zlatná na Ostrove provides an extensive habitat for great bustards.

Excellent opportunities for summer recreation are provided by the lakes Zlaté piesky in Bratislava and the lakes Slnečné jazerá in Senec, or by thermal swimming pools in Dunajská Streda, Veľký Meder and Diakovce.
