= Parížske močiare =

Coordinates: 47.8653°N 18.4989°E

Parížske močiare National Nature Reserve
- IUCN category IV (habitat/species management area)
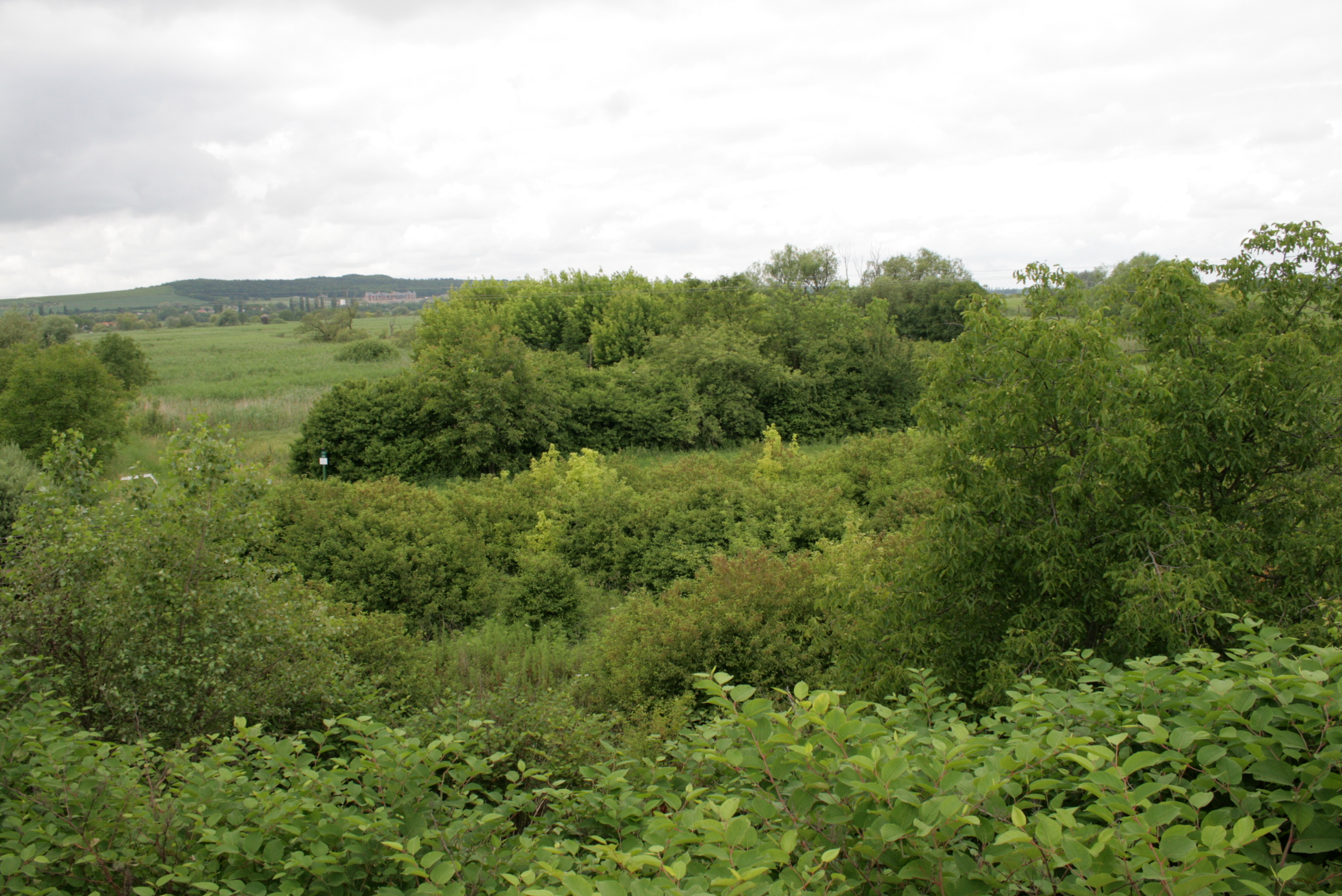
- Interactive map of Parížske močiare National Nature Reserve
- Area: 1.84 km^{2} (0.71 sq mi)
- Established: 1966
- Governing body: ŠOP - S-CHKO Dunajské luhy

Ramsar Wetland
- Official name: Parízské mociare
- Designated: 2 July 1990
- Reference no.: 499

Parížske močiare is a national nature reserve in the Slovak municipality of Nová Vieska in the Nové Zámky District. The nature reserve covers an area of 184 ha in the Danubian Lowland. It has a protection level of 4 under the slovak nature protection system. The protected area is one of the most valuable and last original localities of waterfowl in the Slovak republic.

== Fauna ==
The moustached warbler has the northern margin of its range and the only nesting locality in the Slovak republic in Parížske močiare. Other species present are mallards and Eurasian coots. Other bird species present in the nature reserve are Garganey, Greylag goose, Western marsh harrier, Little bittern, European bee-eater and Little crake.
