= Gabčíkovo Dam =

Dam in Gabčíkovo, Trnava, Slovakia

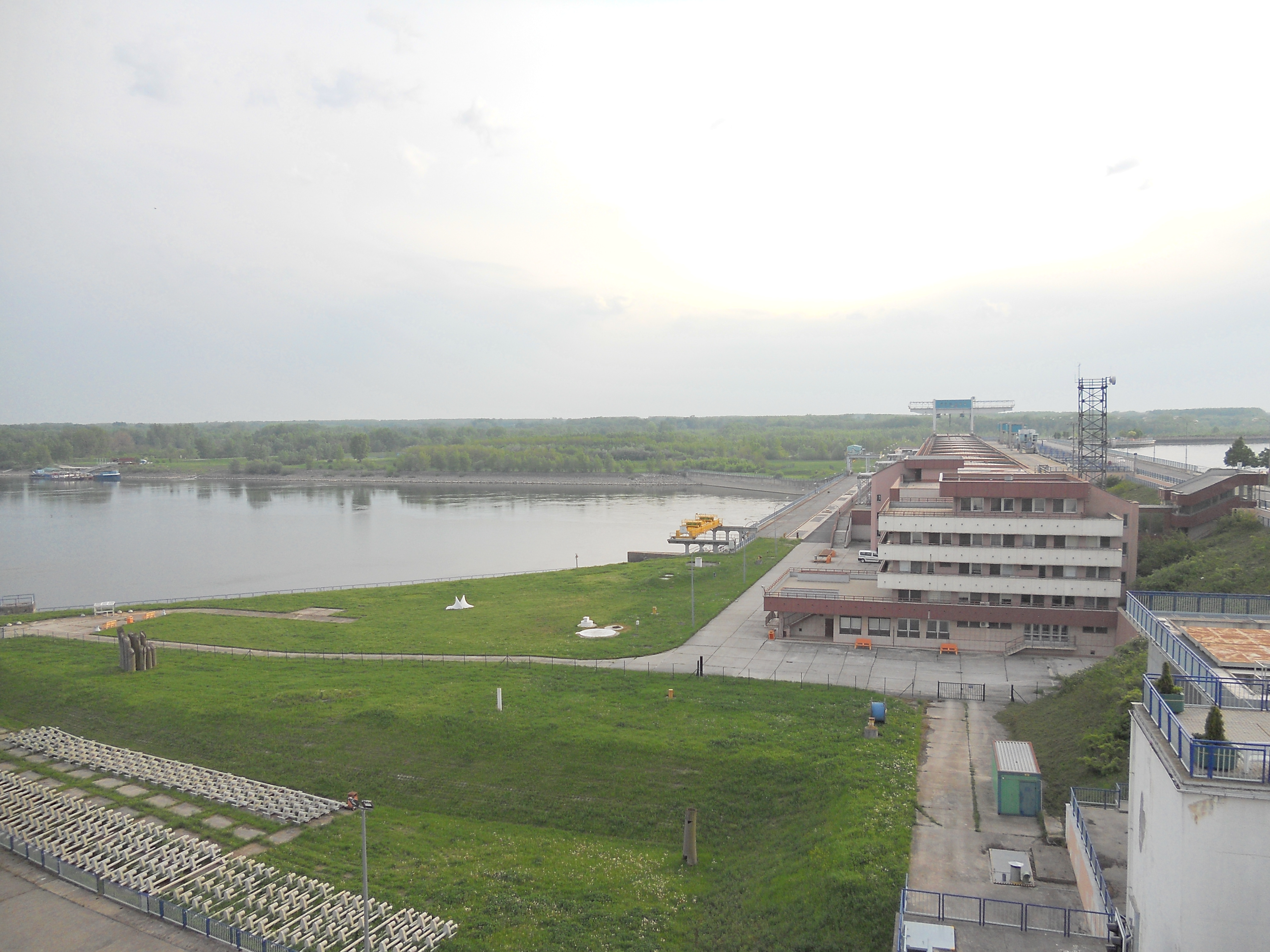

- Location within Slovakia Location within Trnava Region Location within Europe
- Country: Slovakia
- Location: Gabčíkovo, Trnava Region
- Coordinates: 47.88°N 17.539167°E
- Purpose: Electricity generation, navigability, flood protection
- Status: Operating
- Opening date: 1992
- Owner: Slovak government

Reservoir
- Creates: Gabčíkovo Reservoir
- Total capacity: 195,581 cubic metres (255,810 yd^{3})

Hydropowerplant Gabčíkovo
- Turbines: 8 Kaplan turbines
- Installed capacity: 720 MW
- Annual generation: 2.2 TWh

Gabčíkovo Dam is a major dam and hydroelectric powerplant on the Danube located in southwest Slovakia near the Hungarian border and the town of Gabčíkovo, after which it has been named. The dam was opened in the 1990s for the purpose of harnessing Danube's power in form of electricity, easing the navigability of the relatively busy waterway and providing greater flood protection to the nearby area of Žitný Island. However, it has been criticized for its impact on the natural environment, namely on rare alluvial forests spread around Danube's uniquely preserved system of river arms.

The dam creates a reservoir of the same name, which spans upstream to Slovakia's capital Bratislava. It is a popular location for recreational activities, including watersports and cycling. Since Gabčíkovo dam has been constructed on a lowland with no natural barriers and elevation differences to hold the retained water, long artificial levees have been constructed on the sides of the reservoir, spanning its length. The original plan involved constructing part of the reservoir on Hungarian soil, but due to Hungary having abandoned the project, secondary Čunovo Dam has been constructed to restrain the flooded area only to Slovak soil. Čunovo Dam lets a portion of river's discharge flow into the old (former) Danube's main channel, around which the aforementioned alluvial forests are located, while Gabčíkovo Dam together with the side levees create a new, artificial main channel for the rest of the water volume.

== Image gallery ==
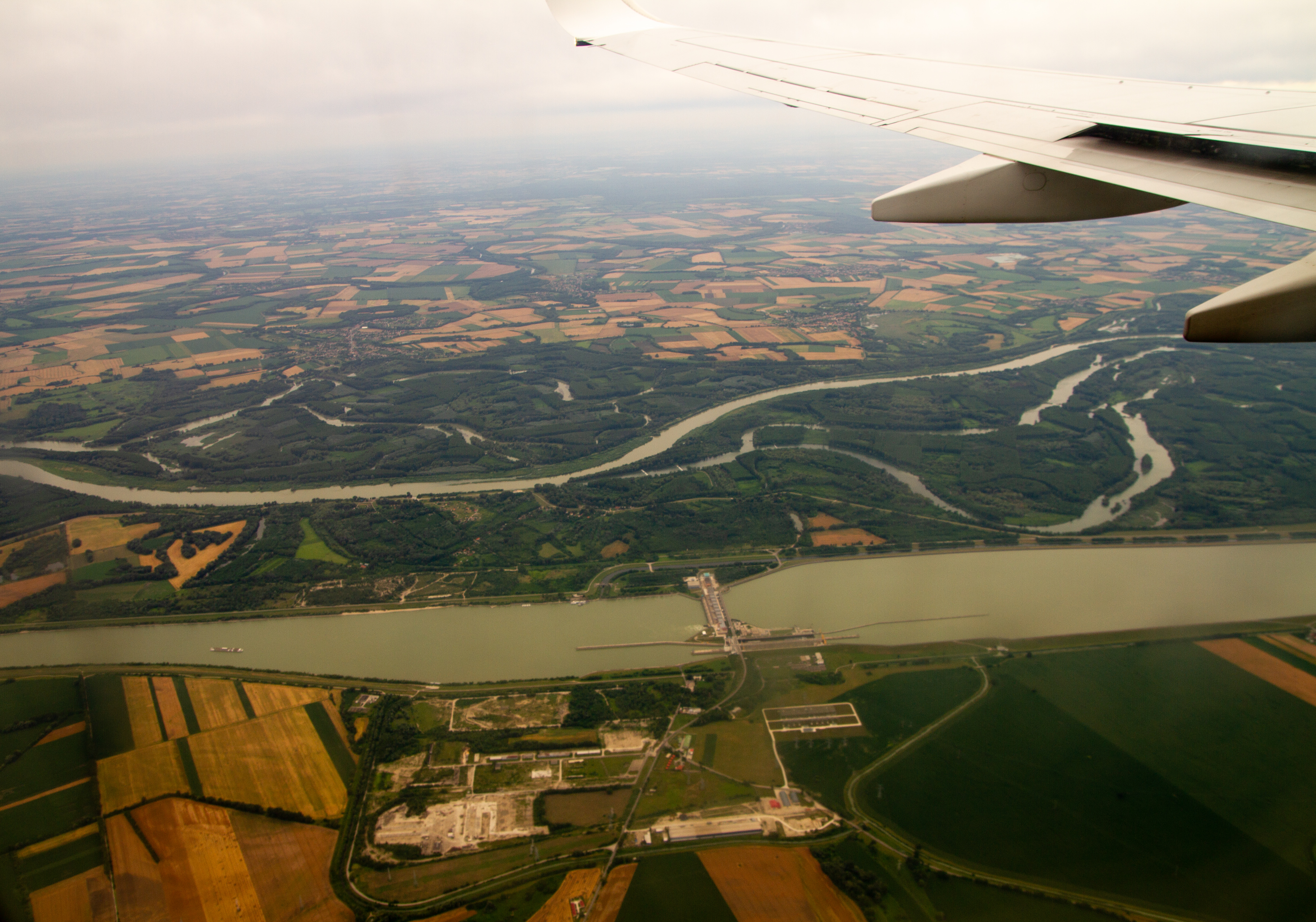
Areal view of Gabčíkovo Dam

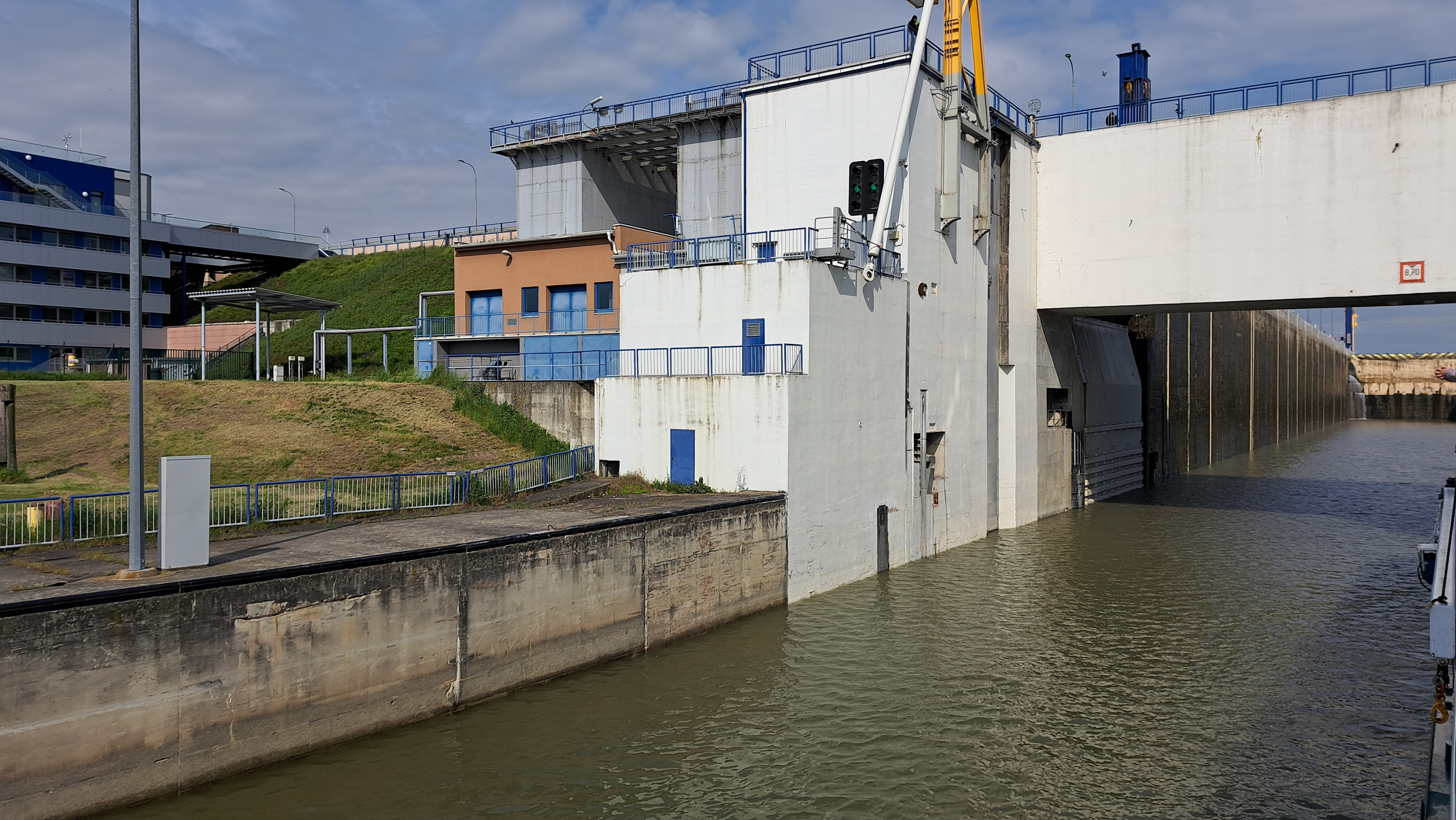
Entrance into one of the locks

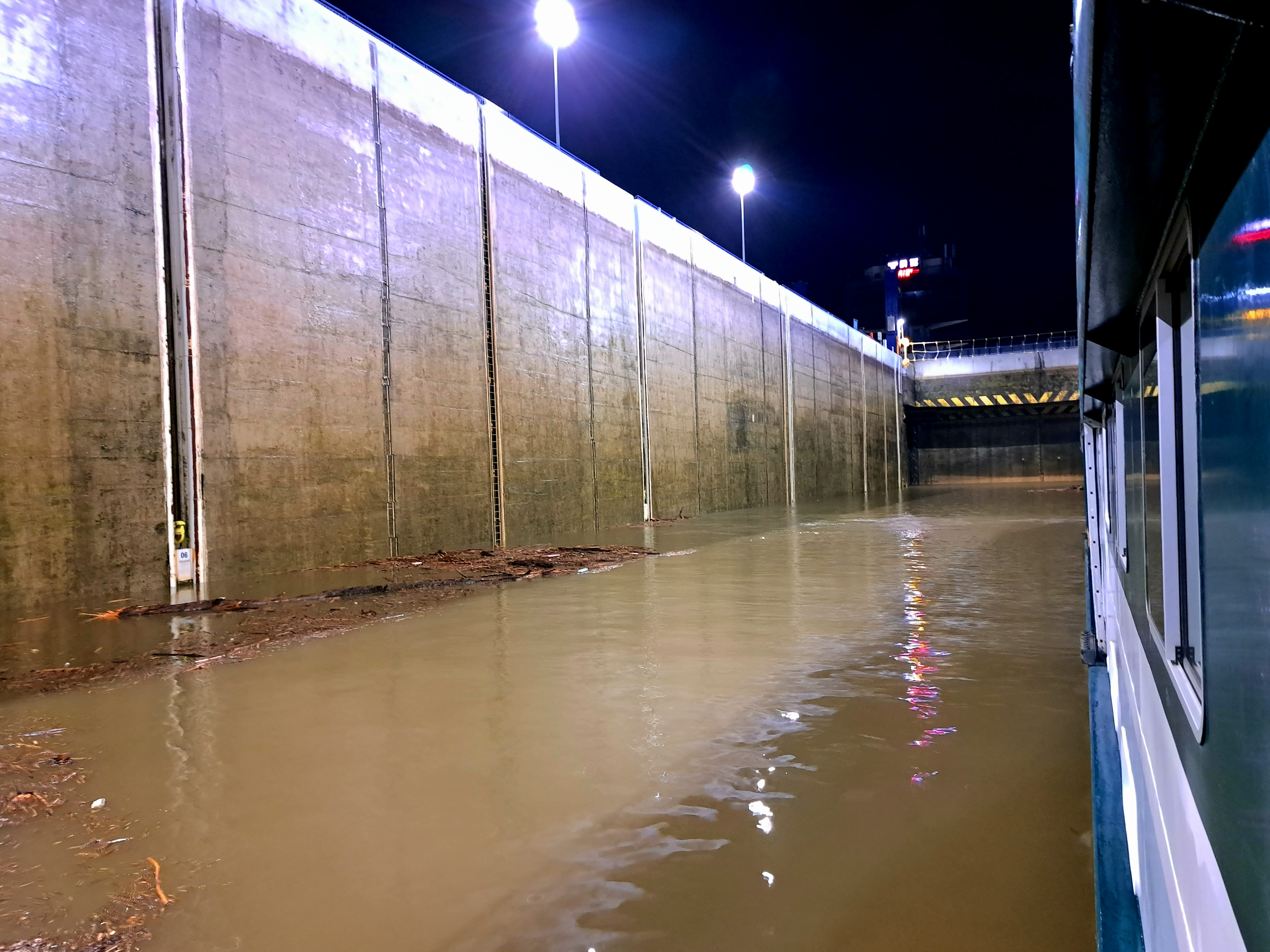
Sailing through one of the locks at night

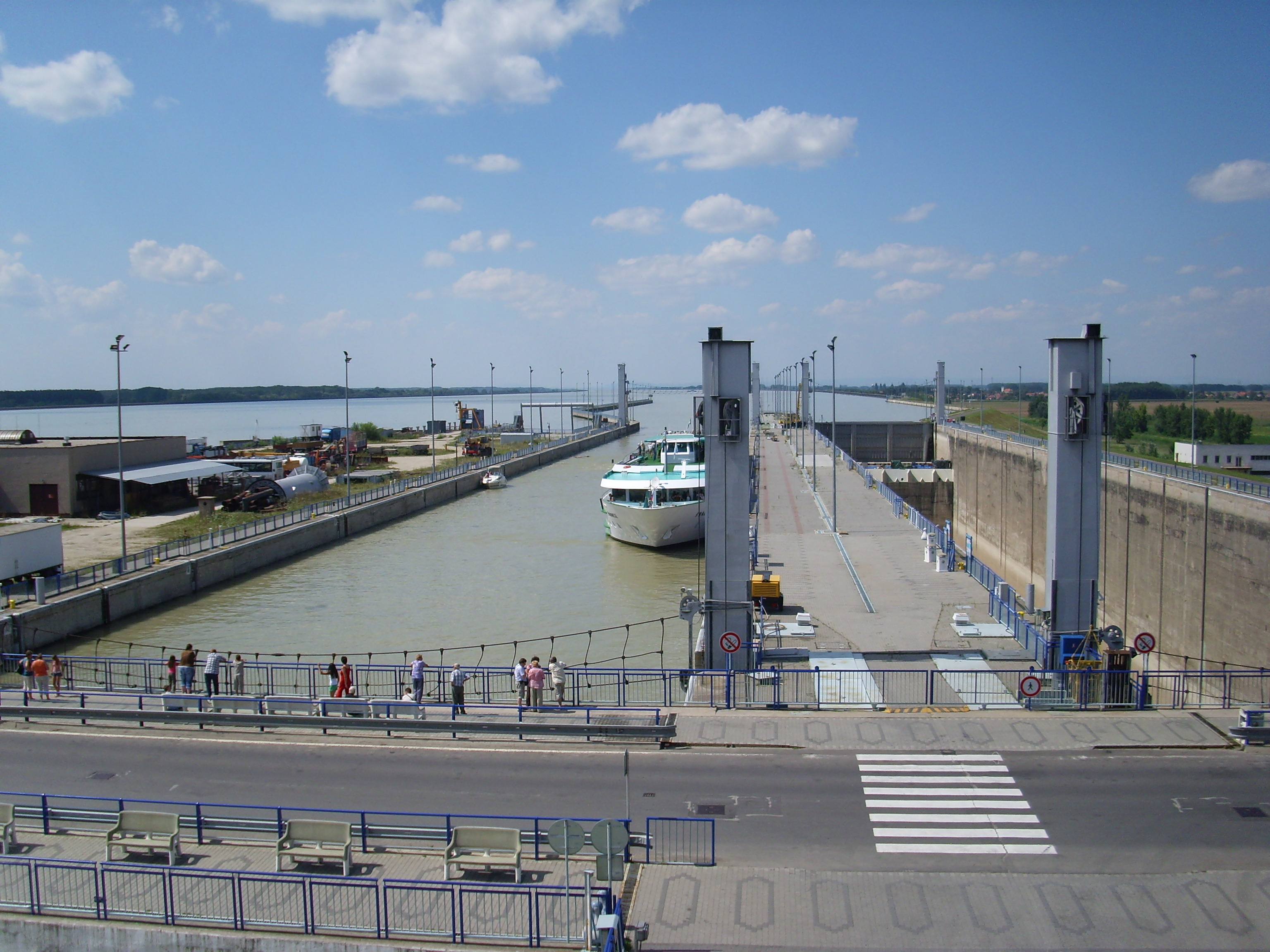
Both locks

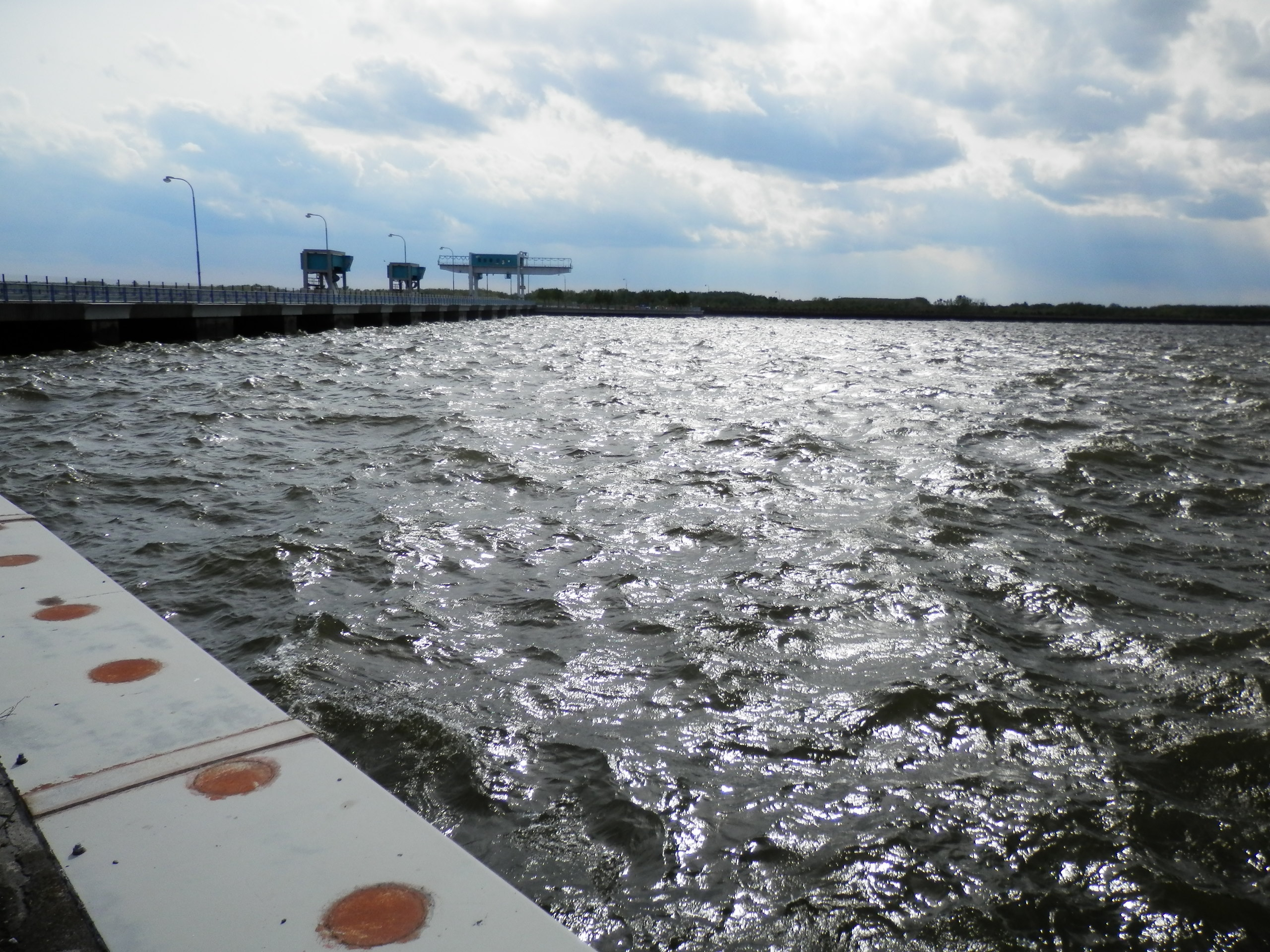
Water next to the dam upstream

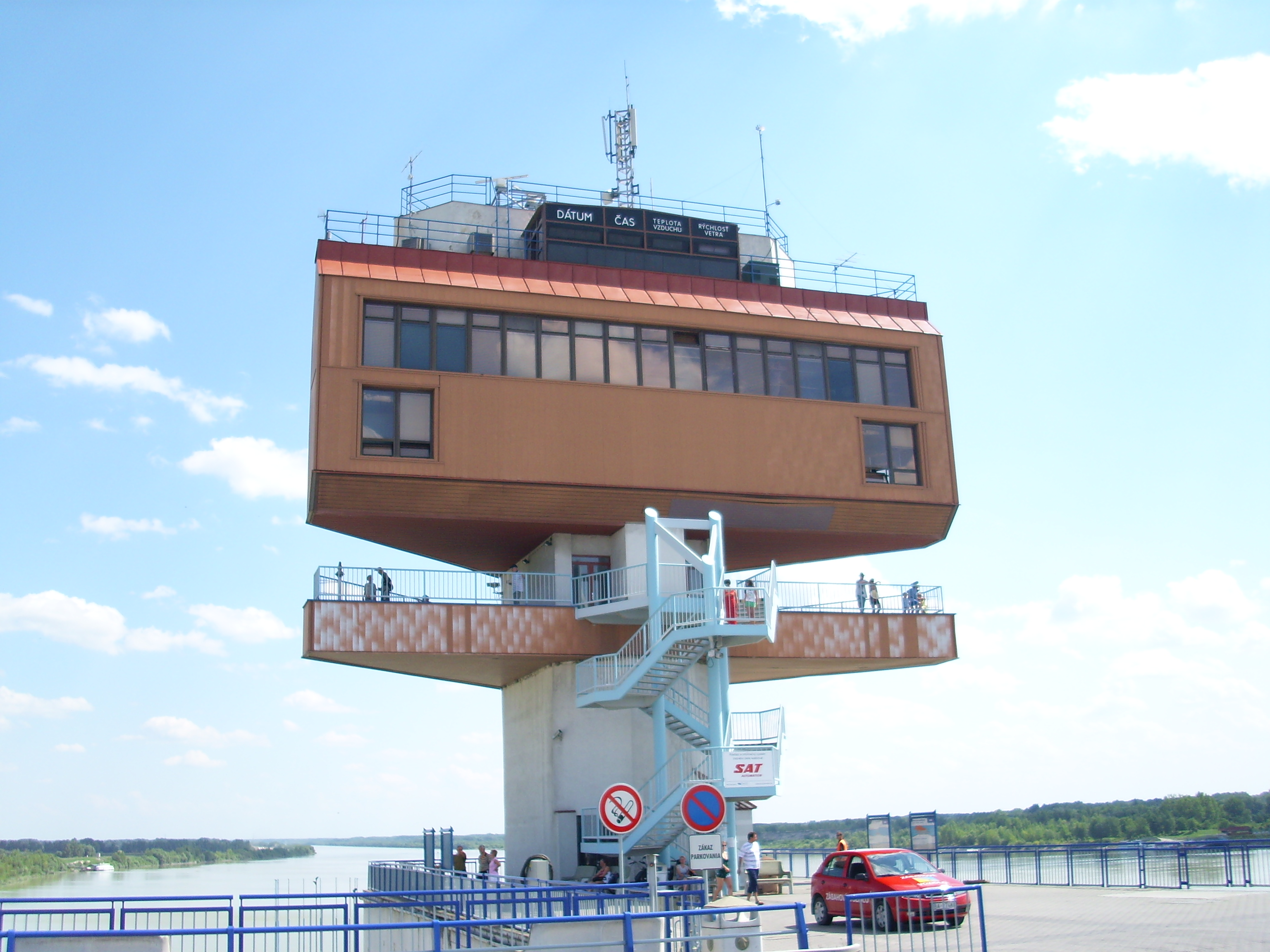
Tower on the dam

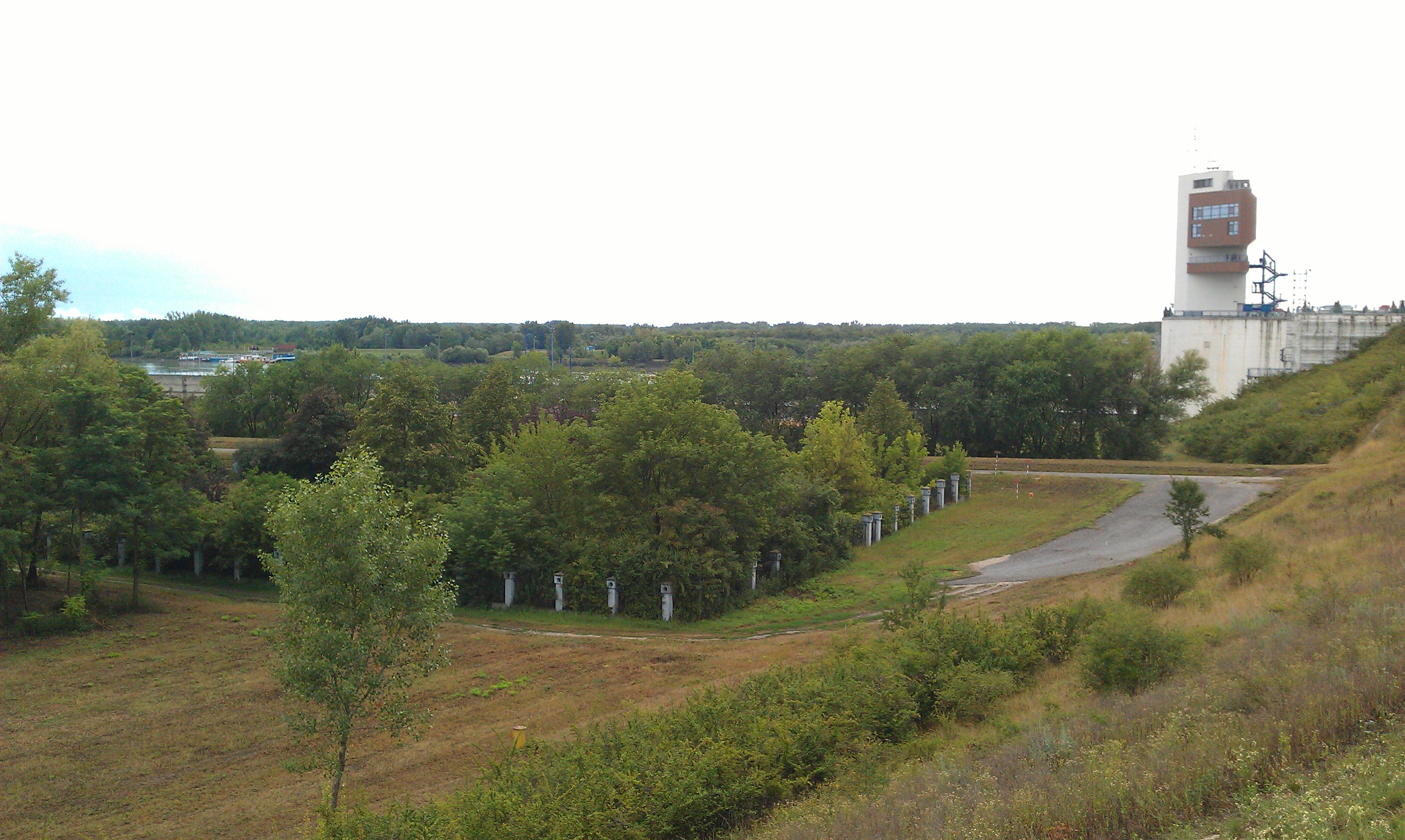
Countryside next to the dam

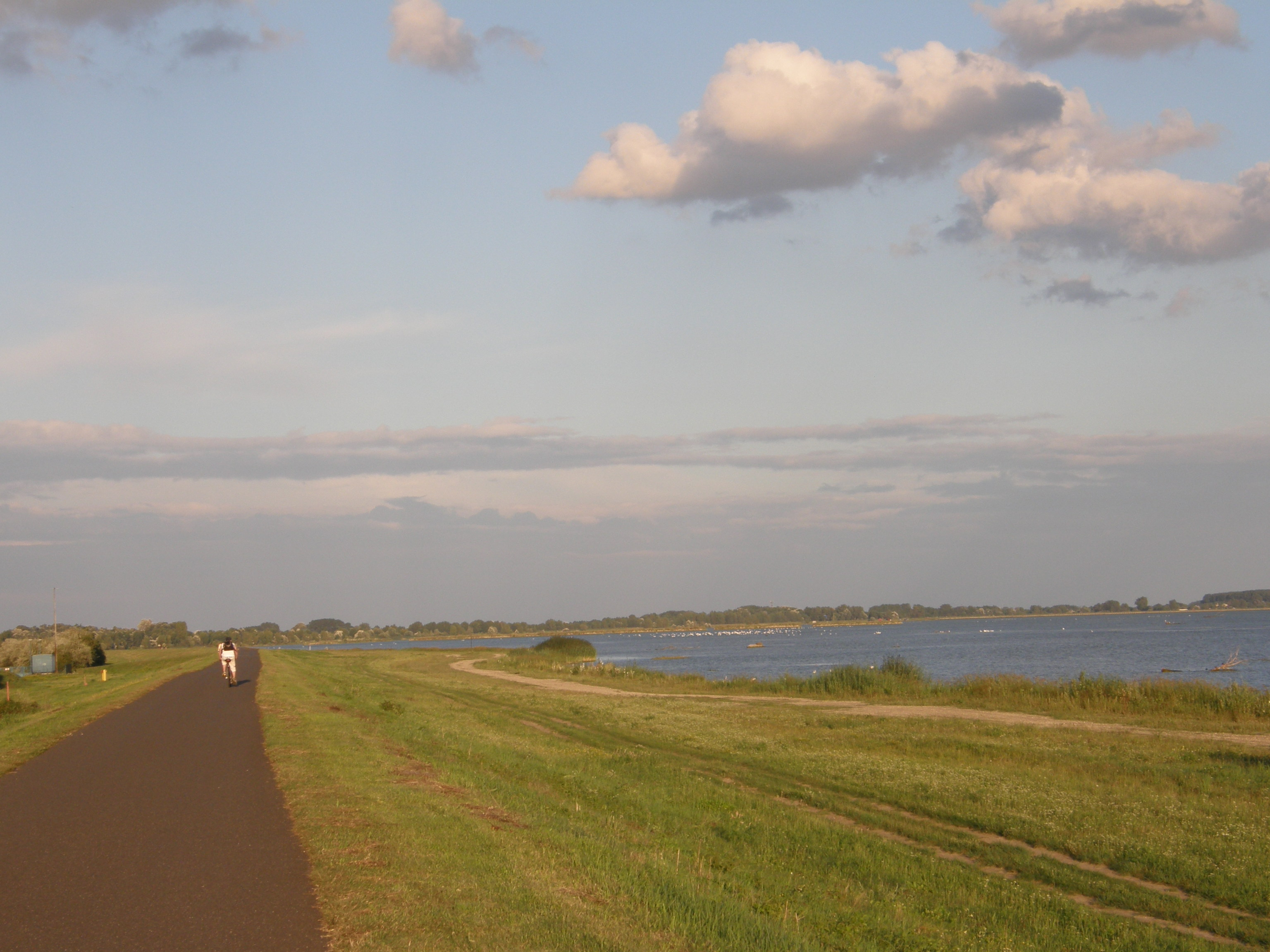
A cycle path next to the reservoir
