= Military ranks of Hungary =

The military ranks of Hungary are the military insignia used by the Hungarian Defence Forces. The Land Forces and Air Force ranks are the same, as the Hungarian Defense Forces are an integrated service. Hungary is a landlocked country and possess only a brown water River Guard.

== Branch colours ==
Colour	Branch
Dark blue	River Flotilla
Sand	Reconnaissance; Special Operations
Rifle green	Infantry
Light blue	Air Force General officers; Pilots; Air force branch
Steel green	Technical; Chemical protection; Financial
Black	Armour; Chaplain
Cornflower blue	IT; Communication; Electronic warfare
Scarlet	General officers; Artillery; Air defence artillery; Air defence locator; Musician; Military Police; Crown guard
Carmine	Logistics; Cartographer; Legal and administrative; Medical; Movement Control; Engineer; Technician; Health; Military national security
Optical white	Honorary battalion
Bottle green	Palace guard

Százados in chemical protection

Főhadnagy in logistics

== Commissioned officer ranks ==
The rank insignia of commissioned officers.

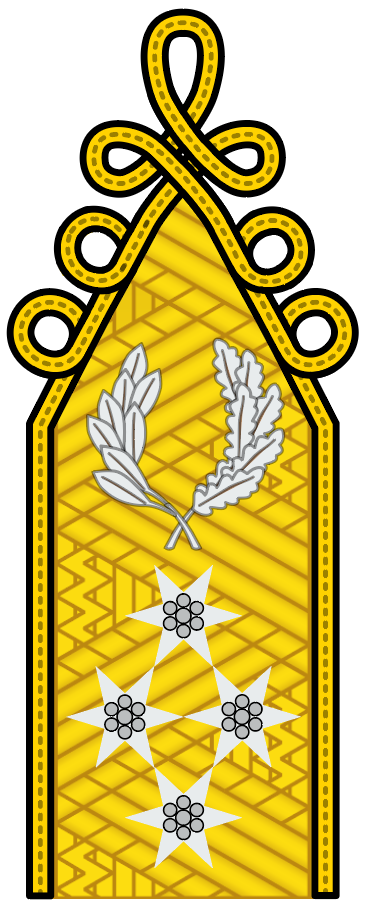
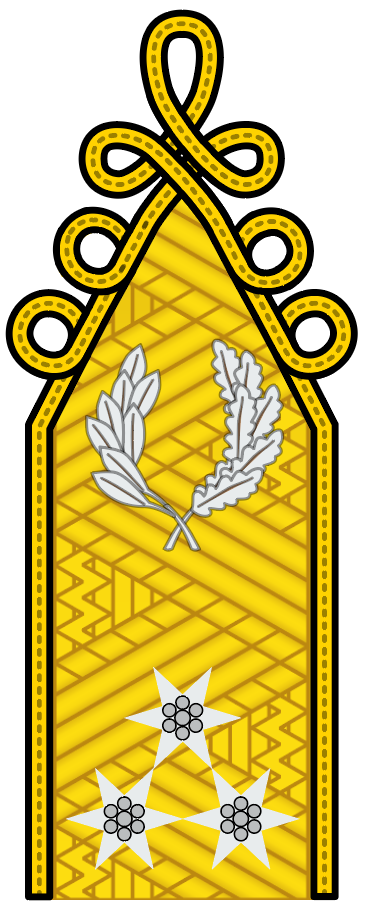
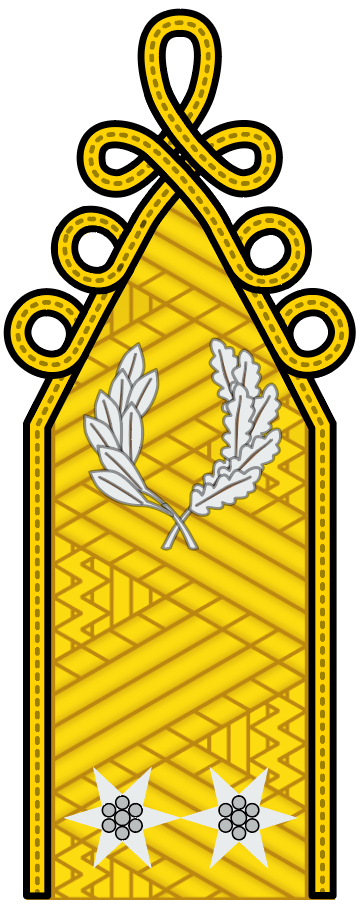
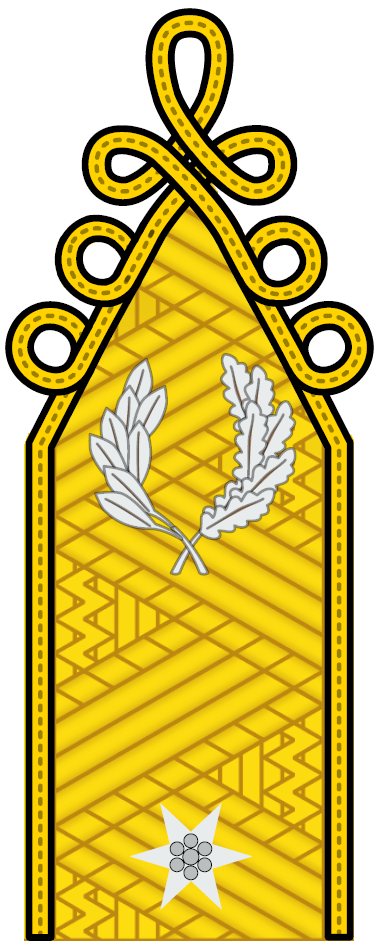
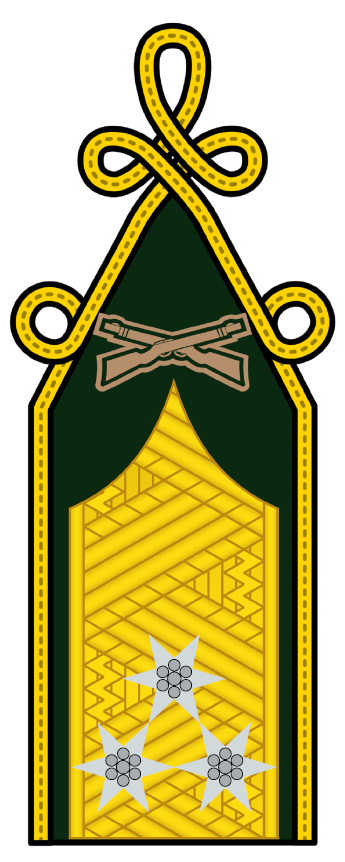
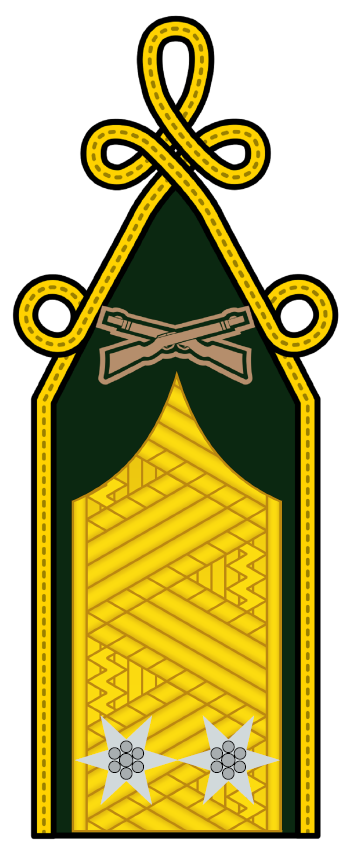
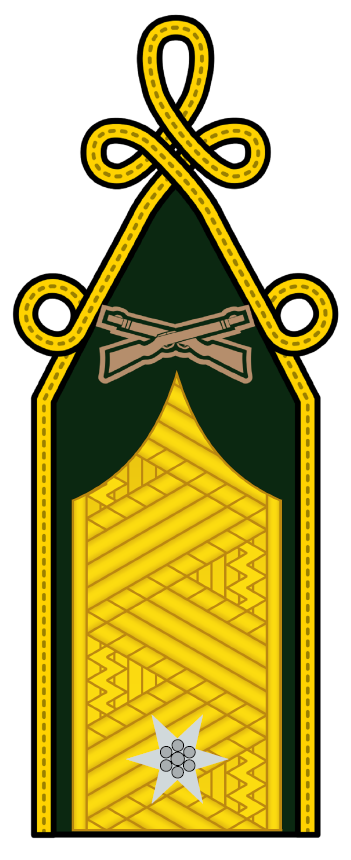
NATO code	OF-10	OF-9	OF-8	OF-7	OF-6	OF-5	OF-4	OF-3	OF-2	OF-1
Hungarian Ground Forces
Hungarian Ground Forces		Vezérezredes	Altábornagy	Vezérőrnagy	Dandártábornok	Ezredes	Alezredes	Őrnagy	Százados	Főhadnagy	Hadnagy
Hungarian River Guard
Hungarian River Guard						Ezredes	Alezredes	Őrnagy	Százados	Főhadnagy	Hadnagy
Hungarian Air Force
Hungarian Air Force		Vezérezredes	Altábornagy	Vezérőrnagy	Dandártábornok	Ezredes	Alezredes	Őrnagy	Százados	Főhadnagy	Hadnagy
Literal translation		Leading regimental commander	Subfield marshal	Leading guard-major	Brigade-general	Regiment (leader)	Subregiment (leader)	Guard-major	Squadron (leader)	Chief military-major	Military-major
Official translation		General	Lieutenant General	Major General	Brigadier General	Colonel	Lieutenant Colonel	Major	Captain	First Lieutenant	Second Lieutenant

== Other ranks ==
The rank insignia of non-commissioned officers and enlisted personnel.

NATO code	OR-9	OR-8		OR-7	OR-6	OR-5	OR-4	OR-3	OR-2	OR-1
Hungarian Ground Forces
Hungarian Ground Forces	Főtörzszászlós	Törzszászlós	Zászlós	Főtörzsőrmester	Törzsőrmester	Őrmester	Szakaszvezető	Tizedes	Őrvezető	Közkatona
Hungarian River Guard
Hungarian River Guard	Főtörzszászlós	Törzszászlós	Zászlós	Főtörzsőrmester	Törzsőrmester	Őrmester	Szakaszvezető	Tizedes	Őrvezető	Közkatona
Hungarian Air Force
Hungarian Air Force	Főtörzszászlós	Törzszászlós	Zászlós	Főtörzsőrmester	Törzsőrmester	Őrmester	Szakaszvezető	Tizedes	Őrvezető	Közkatona
Literal translation	Chief staff flagbearer	Staff flagbearer	Flagbearer	Chief staff guard-master	Staff guard-master	Guard-master	Platoon-leader	Squad (leader)	Guard-leader	Common soldier
Official translation	Chief warrant officer	Senior warrant officer	Warrant officer	Sergeant first class	Staff Sergeant	Sergeant	Corporal	Private first class	Private (PV2)	Private (PV1)

== See also ==
- Rank insignia of the Austro-Hungarian Army
- Ranks in the Austro-Hungarian Navy
- Military ranks of Austria
- Military ranks of the Kingdom of Hungary
- Ranks of the Hungarian People's Army
