= Hungarian Defence Forces =

Combined military forces of Hungary

- Magyar Honvédség
- Emblem of the Hungarian Defence Forces

- Flag of the Hungarian Defence Forces
- Motto: A hazáért (transl. For the homeland)
- Founded: 16 May 1848; 178 years ago
- Current form: 15 March 1990
- Service branches: Hungarian Ground Forces; Hungarian Air Force
- Headquarters: Budapest
- Website: defence.hu

Leadership
- Commander-in-chief: András Baka
- Prime Minister: Péter Magyar
- Minister of Defence: Romulusz Ruszin-Szendi
- Chief of General Staff: Colonel general Zsolt Sándor

Personnel
- Military age: 18–50 years of age
- Conscription: No (suspended on 3 November 2004)
- Active personnel: 41,600
- Reserve personnel: 20,000
- Deployed personnel: 868 (2019)

Expenditure
- Budget: $5.23 billion (2024) (ranked 41st)
- Percent of GDP: 2.14% (2024)

Industry
- Foreign suppliers: Czech Republic; France; Germany; Italy; Sweden; Turkey; United States; Russia; Former: Soviet Union

Related articles
- History: Military history of Hungary
- Ranks: Military ranks of Hungary

The Hungarian Defence Forces (HDF; Hungarian: Magyar Honvédség, lit. 'Hungarian Homeland-Guard', Hungarian pronunciation: [ˈmɒɟɒr ˈhonveːt͡ʃːeːg]) is the national military of Hungary. Since 2007, the Hungarian Armed Forces has been under a unified command structure. The Ministry of Defence maintains political and civil control over the army. A subordinate Joint Forces Command coordinates and commands the HDF corps. In 2020, the armed forces had 22,700 personnel on active duty. In 2019, military spending was $1.904 billion, about 1.22% of the country's GDP, well below the NATO target of 2%. In 2016, the government adopted a resolution in which it pledged to increase defence spending to 2.0% of GDP and the number of active personnel to 37,650 by 2026.

Military service is voluntary, though conscription may occur in wartime. In a significant move for modernization, Hungary decided in 2001 to buy 14 JAS 39 Gripen fighter aircraft for about €800 million. It also bought two used Airbus A319 and two Falcon 7X transport aircraft. Three C-17 III Globemaster transport aircraft are operating from Pápa Air Base under Hungarian nationality mark but are maintained by the NATO Heavy Airlift Wing (HAW). An intensive modernization program started in 2016 under the name "Zrínyi 2026". New helicopters, tanks, IFVs and artillery equipment were purchased beside others. Hungarian National Cyber Security Center was re-organized in 2016.

As of 2016, the Hungarian military has about 700 troops stationed in foreign countries as part of international peacekeeping forces, 210 Hungarian soldiers in Kosovo under command of KFOR, and 160 troops in Bosnia and Herzegovina. Hungary sent a 300-strong logistics unit to Iraq in order to help the US occupation with armed transport convoys, though public opinion opposed the country's participation in the war. One soldier was killed in action by a roadside bomb in Iraq.

During the Hungarian Revolution of 1848, the HDF drove Habsburg forces from the country in the Spring Campaign of 1849, but was defeated by an Austro-Russian offensive in the summer. The Royal Hungarian Honvéd was established in 1867. During World War I, out of the eight million men mobilized by Austria-Hungary, over one million died. Conscription was introduced on a national basis in 1939. The peacetime strength of the Royal Hungarian Army grew to 80,000 men organized into seven corps commands. During World War II the Hungarian Second Army was destroyed on the banks of the Don River in December 1942 in the Battle of Stalingrad. During the Socialist and the Warsaw Pact era (1947–1989), the entire 200,000 strong Southern Group of Forces was garrisoned in Hungary, complete with artillery, tank regiments, air force and missile troops with nuclear weapons.

== Structure ==
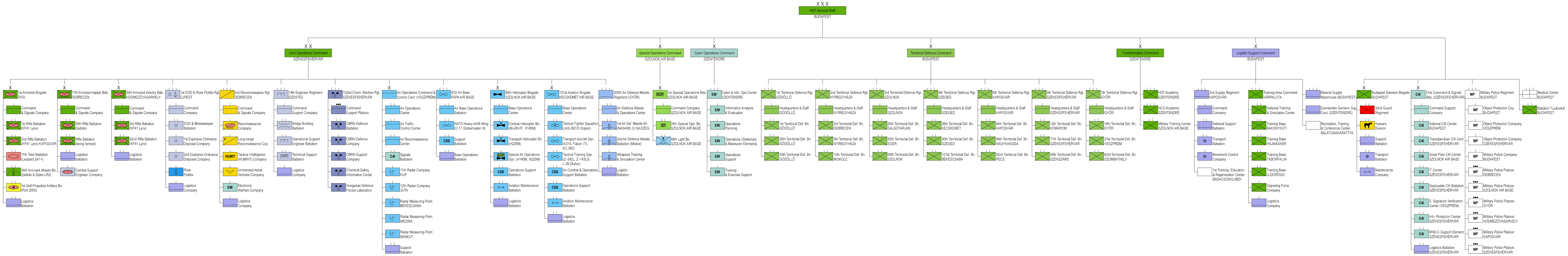
Hungarian Defence Forces organization as of September 2025 (click image to enlarge)

== Flag and emblem ==
The central element of the emblem of the Hungarian Defence Forces is the Turul bird with extended wings holding the sword of King Saint Stephen in its claws. The element is surrounded by a turkey oak branch on the right and an olive branch on the left. At the meeting point of the branches is the "Hungarian Defense Shield" in the national color. The inscription "A HAZÁÉRT" can be read at the top as "for the homeland", and "MAGYAR HONVÉDSÉG" can be read in a semicircle at the bottom as "Hungarian Defence Forces". The flag of the Hungarian Defence Forces is white, and the emblem is placed in the middle of the flag.

== History ==
=== Ancient, medieval, and early modern military ===
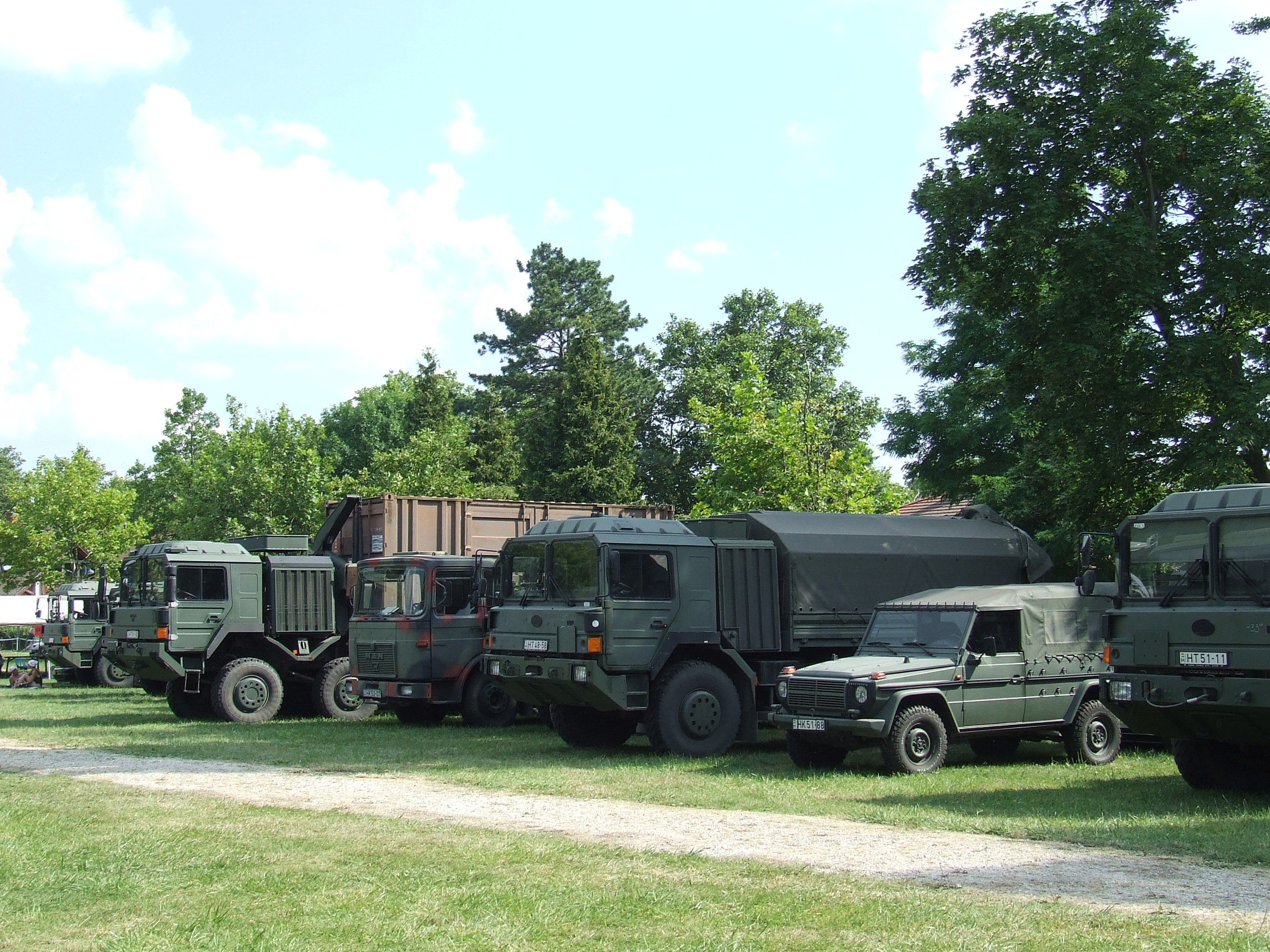
Military vehicles on show

The Hungarian tribes of Árpád vezér who came to settle in the Carpathian Basin were noted for their fearsome light cavalry, which conducted frequent raids throughout much of Western Europe (as far as present-day Spain), maintaining their military supremacy with long-range and rapid-firing reflex bows. Not until the introduction of well-regulated, plate-armored knight heavy cavalry could German emperors stop the Hungarian armies.

During the Árpáds the light-cavalry-based army was transformed slowly into a western-style one. The light cavalry lost its privileged position, replaced by a feudal army formed mainly from heavy cavalry.

The Hungarian field armies were drawn up into an articulated formation (as it happened in Battle of Przemyśl (1099), Battle at Leitha (1146), Battle of Morvamező (1278), (1349), in three main battle (formation) (1146, 1278, 1349). According to the contemporary sources and later speculations, the first line was formed by light cavalry archers (Battle of Oslava (1116, 1146, 1260, 1278). Usually, they started the battle followed by a planned retreat (1116, 1146), Battle of Kressenbrunn (1260). The major decisive battles of the Hungarian army were placed in the second or third lines consisted mainly of the most valuable parts of the army – in general heavy cavalry (1146, 1278, 1349).

The commanders of the Hungarian Kingdom's army used different tactics, based on a recognition of their own and the enemies' (Holy Roman Empire, Pechenegs, Uzes, Cumans, Mongols, Byzantine Empire) abilities and deficiencies.

The Hungarian knight army had its golden age under King Louis the Great, who himself was a famed warrior and conducted successful campaigns in Italy due to family matters (his younger brother married Joanna I, Queen of Naples who murdered him later.) King Matthias Corvinus maintained very modern mercenary-based royal troops, called the Black Army. King Matthias favoured ancient artillery (catapults) as opposed to cannons, which were the favourite of his father, Johannes Hunyadi, former Regent of Hungary.

During the Ottoman invasion of Central Europe (between late 14th century and circa 1700) Hungarian soldiers protected fortresses and launched light cavalry attacks against the Turks (see Hungarian Hussars). The northern fortress of Eger was famously defended in the autumn of 1552 during the 39-day Siege of Eger against the combined forces of two Ottoman armies numbering circa 120,000 men and 16 ultra-heavy siege guns. The victory was very important, because two much stronger forts of Szolnok and Temesvár had fallen quickly during the summer. Public opinion attributed Eger's success to the all-Hungarian garrison, as the above two forts had fallen due to treason by the foreign mercenaries manning them. In 1596, Eger fell to the Ottomans for the same reason.

In the 1566 Battle of Szigetvár, Miklós Zrínyi defended Szigetvár for 30 days against the largest Ottoman army ever seen up to that day, and died leading his remaining few soldiers on a final suicide charge to become one of the best-known national heroes. His great-grandson, Miklós Zrínyi, poet and general, became one of the better-known strategists of the 1660s. In 1686, the capital city Buda was freed from the Ottomans by an allied Christian army composed of Austrian, Hungarian, and Western European troops, each roughly one-third of the army. The Habsburg empire then annexed Hungary.

=== Habsburg military and Hungarian anti-Habsburg uprisings ===
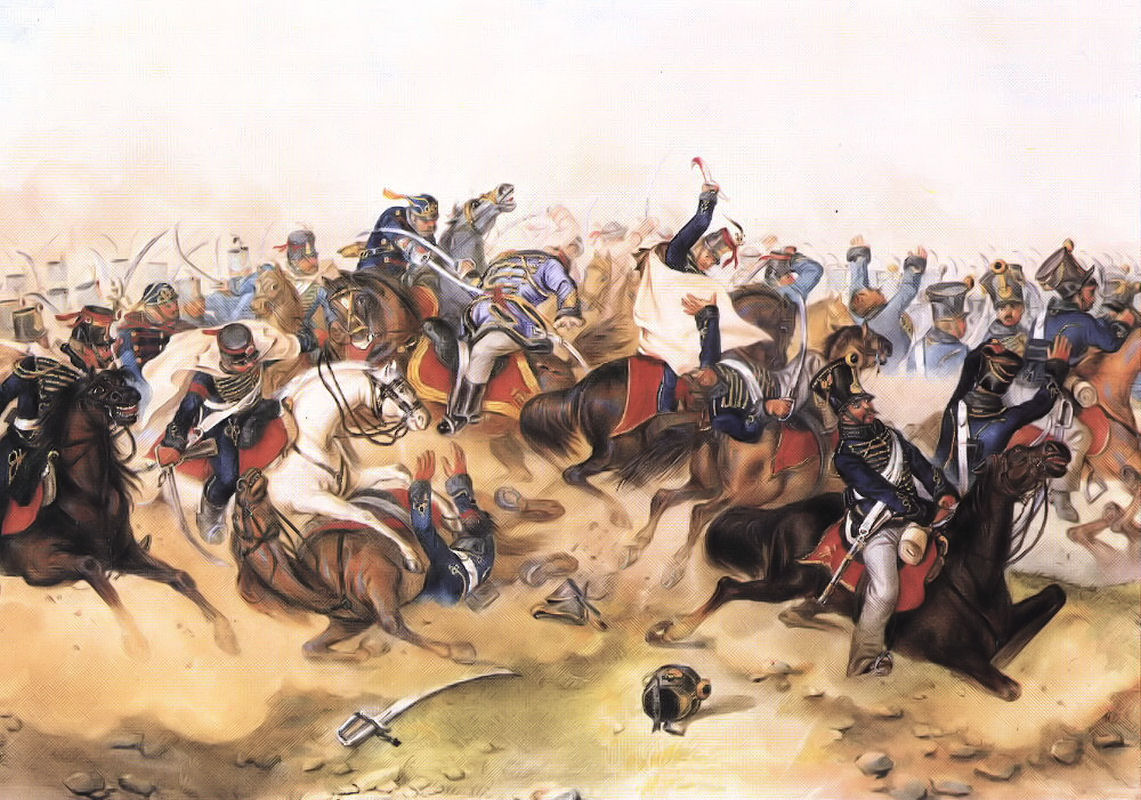
Hungarian hussars in battle during the Hungarian Revolution of 1848

Under Habsburg rule, Hungarian Hussars rose to international fame and served as a model for light cavalry in many European countries. During the 18th and 19th centuries hundreds of thousands of forcibly enrolled Hungarian males served 12 years or more each as line infantry in the Austrian Imperial Army.

Two wars of independence interrupted this era, that of Prince Francis II Rákóczi between 1703 and 1711 and that of Lajos Kossuth in 1848–1849. A July 11, 1848 act of parliament in Budapest called for the formation of an army, the Honvédség, of 200,000 which would use the Magyar language of command. It was to be formed around already extant imperial units, twenty battalions of infantry, ten hussar regiments, and two regiments of Székely from the Transylvanian Military Frontier. They were further joined by eight companies of two Italian regiments stationed in Hungary and parts of the Fifth Bohemian Artillery Regiment.

In 1848–1849 the Honvédség (mostly made up of enthusiastic patriots with no prior military training) achieved incredible successes against better-trained and -equipped Austrian forces, despite the obvious advantage in numbers on the Austrian side. The Winter Campaign of Józef Bem and the Spring Campaign of Artúr Görgey are to this day taught at prestigious military schools around the globe, including at West Point Academy in the United States. Having suffered initial setbacks, including the loss of Pest-Buda, the Honvéd took advantage of the Austrians' lack of initiative and re-formed around the Debrecen-based Kossuth government. The Hungarians advanced again and by the end of spring 1849, Hungary was basically cleared of foreign forces, and would have achieved independence, were it not for the Russian intervention. At the request of the Austrian emperor Franz Joseph, the Russians invaded with a force of 190,000 soldiers – against the Honvédség's 135,000 – and decisively defeated Bem's Second Army in Transylvania, opening the path into the heart of Hungary. This way the Austrian-Russian coalition outnumbered Hungarian forces 3:1, which led to Hungary's surrender at Világos on 13 August 1849. Sándor Petőfi, the great Hungarian poet, went missing in action in the Battle of Segesvár, against invading Russian forces. However, even outnumbered so greatly, the Hungarians scored several great victories, such as the battles of Komárom. Komárom remained free and defiant under the command of General György Klapka after the surrender of the main army at Világos, until an armistice was granted at the end of September.

In April 1867, the Austro-Hungarian Empire was established. Franz Josef, the head of the ancient Habsburg dynasty, was recognized as both Emperor of Austria and King of Hungary. Nevertheless, the issue of what form the Hungarian military would take remained a matter of serious contention between Hungarian patriots and Austrian leaders. As the impasse threatened the political union, Emperor Franz Josef ordered a council of generals in November of the same year. Ultimately, the leaders resolved on the following solution: in addition to the joint (k.u.k.) army, Hungary would have its own defence force, whose members would swear their oath to the King of Hungary (who was also Emperor of Austria) and the national constitution, use the Hungarian language of command, and display their own flags and insignia. (Austria would also form its own parallel national defence force, the Landwehr.) As a result of these negotiations, on 5 December 1868, the Royal Hungarian Honvéd (Magyar Kiralyi Honvédség, or Defence Force) was established.

The Honvédség was usually treated generously by the Diet in Budapest. By 1873 it already had over 2,800 officers and 158,000 men organized into eighty-six battalions and fifty-eight squadrons. In 1872, the Ludovika Academy officially began training cadets (and later staff officers). Honvédség units engaged in manoeuvres and were organized into seven divisions in seven military districts. While artillery was not allowed, the force did form batteries of Gatling guns in the 1870s.

In the midst of trouble between the imperial government and the parliament in 1906, the Honvédség was further expanded and finally received its own artillery units. In this form, the force approached the coming world war in most respects as a truly "national" Hungarian army.

==== World War I ====
Hungarian soldiers "fought with distinction" on every front contested by Austria-Hungary in the First World War. Honvédség units (along with the Austrian Landwehr) were considered fit for front line combat service and equal to those of the joint forces K.U.K. army. They saw combat especially on the Eastern Front and at the Battles of the Isonzo on the Italian Front. Out of the eight million men mobilized by Austria-Hungary, over one million died. Hungarians as a national group were second only to German Austrians in their share of this burden, experiencing twenty-eight war deaths for every thousand persons.

After the collapse of the Austro-Hungarian empire in late 1918, the Red Army of the Hungarian communist state (Hungarian Soviet Republic) conducted successful campaigns to protect the country's borders. However, in the Hungarian–Romanian War of 1919 Hungary came under occupation by the Romanian, Serbian, American, and French troops, as after four years of extensive fighting, the country lacked both the necessary manpower and equipment to fend off foreign invaders.

In accordance with the Treaty of Bucharest, upon leaving, the Romanian army took substantial compensation for reparations. This included agricultural goods and industrial machinery as well as raw materials. The Trianon Treaty limited the Hungarian National Army to 35,000 men and forbade conscription. The army was forbidden to possess tanks, heavy armor, or an air force.

=== Interwar period ===
On 9 August 1919, Admiral Miklós Horthy united various anti-communist military units into an 80,000-strong National Army (Nemzeti Hadsereg). On 1 January 1922, the National Army was once again redesignated the Royal Hungarian Army.

During the 1930s and early 1940s, Hungary was preoccupied with the regaining the vast territories and huge amount of population lost in the Trianon peace treaty at Versailles in 1920. This required strong armed forces to defeat the neighbouring states and this was something Hungary could not afford. Instead, the Hungarian Regent, Admiral Miklós Horthy, made an alliance with Nazi Germany. In exchange for this alliance and via the First and Second Vienna Awards, Hungary received back parts of its lost territories from Yugoslavia, Romania, and Czechoslovakia. Hungary was to pay dearly during and after World War II for these temporary gains.

On 5 March 1938, Prime Minister Kálmán Darányi announced a rearmament program (the so-called Győr Programme, named after the city where it was announced to the public). Starting 1 October, the armed forces established a five-year expansion plan with Huba I-III revised orders of battle. Conscription was introduced on a national basis in 1939. The peacetime strength of the Royal Hungarian Army grew to 80,000 men organized into seven corps commands.

During the interwar period, Hungary first sought to recover through peaceful means the territories lost after World War I in order to restore its historical borders and reunite significant Hungarian populations living beyond its frontiers with the mother country. In 1938, under the First Vienna Award, Hungary regained parts of former Hungarian territories from Czechoslovakia that had predominantly Hungarian populations and had been lost under the Treaty of Trianon in 1920. In March 1939, Hungary occupied and annexed Subcarpathia following the collapse of the Second Czechoslovak Republic. Later that month, Hungary launched an invasion from Subcarpathia into the eastern part of the newly established First Slovak Republic, seeking to recover additional territory and shift the border farther west. The ensuing Hungarian–Slovak War was a brief conflict in which both the Royal Hungarian Army and the Royal Hungarian Air Force took part.

On 1 March 1940, Hungary organized its ground forces into three field armies. The Royal Hungarian Army fielded the Hungarian First Army, the Hungarian Second Army, and the Hungarian Third Army. With the exception of the independent "Fast Moving Army Corps" (Gyorshadtest), all three Hungarian field armies were initially relegated to defensive and occupation duties within the regained Hungarian territories.

==== World War II ====
In November 1940, Hungary signed the Tripartite Pact and became a member of the Axis with Nazi Germany and Fascist Italy.

In April 1941, in order to regain territory and because of the German pressure, Hungary allowed the Wehrmacht to cross her territory in order to launch the invasion of Yugoslavia. The Hungarian foreign minister, Pál Teleki who wanted to maintain a pro-allied neutral stance for Hungary, could no longer keep the country out of the war, as the British Foreign Secretary Anthony Eden had threatened to break diplomatic relations with Hungary if it did not actively resist the passage of German troops across its territory, and General Henrik Werth, chief of the Hungarian General Staff made a private arrangement - unsanctioned by the Hungarian government - with the German High Command for the transport of the German troops across Hungary. Pál Teleki, no longer being able to stop the unfolding events, committed suicide on April 3, 1941, and Hungary joined the war on April 11 after the proclamation of the Independent State of Croatia.

After the controversial Kassa attack, elements of the Royal Hungarian Army joined the German invasion of the Soviet Union, Operation Barbarossa, one week later than the start of the operation. In spite of the arguments made that Hungary (unlike Romania) had no territorial claims in the Soviet Union, the fateful decision was made to join the war in the East. In the late summer of 1941, the Hungarian "Rapid Corps" (Gyorshadtest), alongside German and Romanian army groups, scored a huge success against the Soviets at the Battle of Uman. A little more than a year later and contrasting sharply with the success at Uman, was the near-total devastation of the Hungarian Second Army on banks of the Don River in December 1942 during the Battle for Stalingrad.

During 1943, the Hungarian Second Army was rebuilt. In late 1944, as part of Panzerarmee Fretter-Pico, it participated in the destruction of a Soviet mechanized group at the Battle of Debrecen. But this proved to be a Pyrrhic victory. Unable to rebuild again, the Hungarian Second Army was disbanded towards the end of 1944.

To keep Hungary as an ally, the Germans launched Operation Margarethe and occupied Hungary in March 1944. However, during the Warsaw Uprising, Hungarian troops refused to participate.

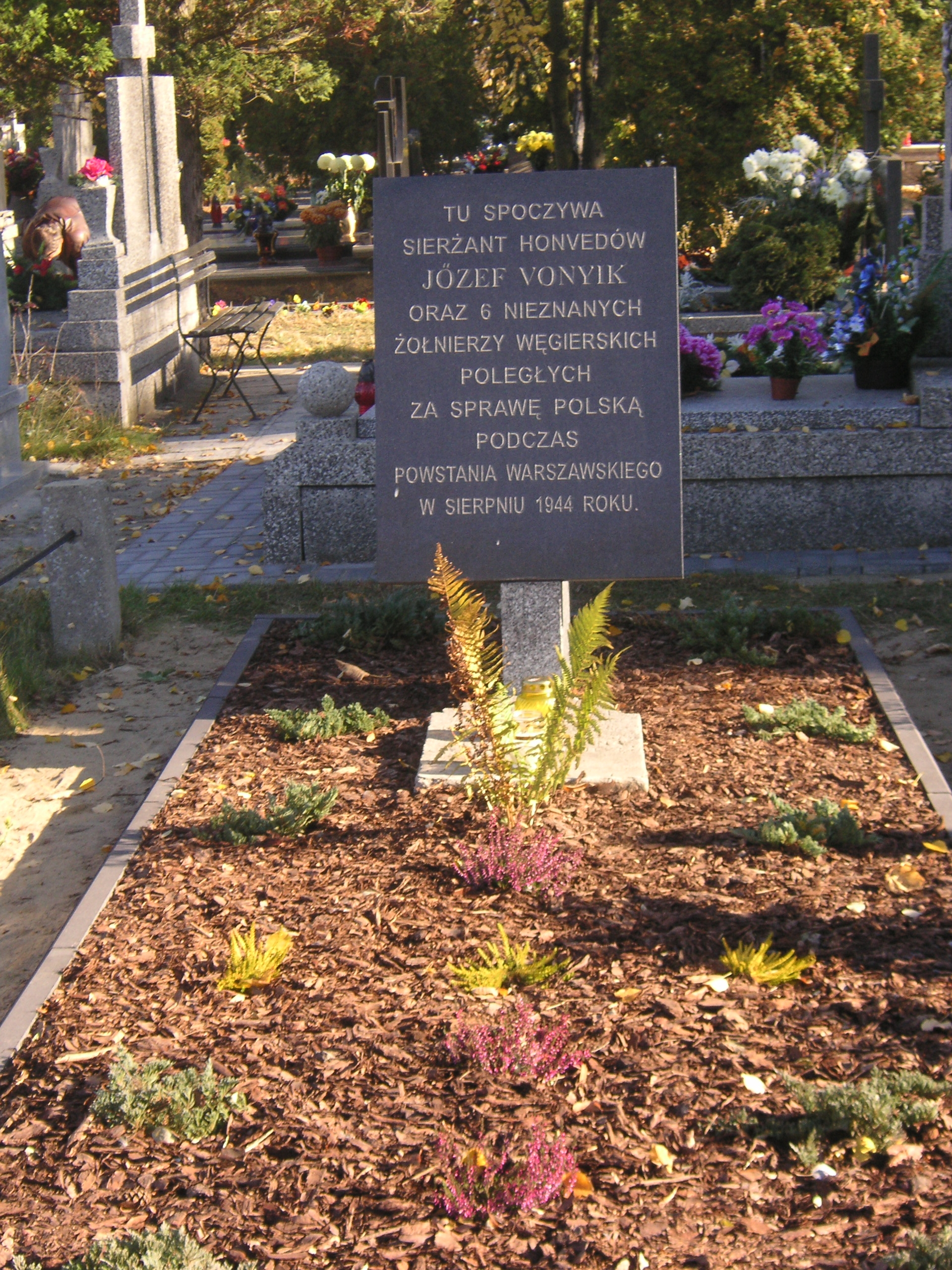
Graves of a Royal Hungarian Army captain and six of his men who died fighting on the Polish side in the Warsaw Uprising 1944

On 15 October 1944, the Germans launched Operation Panzerfaust and forced Horthy to abdicate. Pro-Nazi Ferenc Szálasi was made prime minister by the Germans.

On 28 December 1944, a provisional government under the control of the Soviet Union was formed in liberated Debrecen with Béla Miklós as its prime minister. Miklós was the commander of the Hungarian First Army, but most of the First Army sided with the Germans and most of what remained of it was destroyed about 200 kilometres north of Budapest between 1 January and 16 February. The pro-Communist government formed by Miklós competed with the pro-Nazi government of Ferenc Szálasi. The Germans, Szálasi, and pro-German Hungarian forces loyal to Szálasi fought on. On 20 January 1945, representatives of the provisional government of Béla Miklós signed an armistice in Moscow. But forces loyal to Szálasi still continued to fight on.

The Red Army, with assistance from Romanian army units, completed the encirclement of Budapest on 29 December 1944 and the Siege of Budapest began. On 2 February 1945, the strength of the Royal Hungarian Army was 214,465 men, but about 50,000 of these had been formed into unarmed labor battalions. The siege of Budapest ended with the surrender of the city on 13 February. But, while the German forces in Hungary were generally in a state of defeat, the Germans had one more surprise for the Soviets.

In early March 1945, the Germans launched the Lake Balaton Offensive with support from the Hungarians. This offensive was almost over before it began. By 19 March 1945, Soviet troops had recaptured all the territory lost during a 13-day German offensive.

After the failed offensive, the Germans in Hungary were defeated. Most of what remained of the Hungarian Third Army was destroyed about 50 kilometres west of Budapest between 16 March and 25 March 1945. Officially, Soviet operations in Hungary ended on 4 April 1945 when the last German troops were expelled.

Some pro-fascist Hungarians like Szálasi retreated with the Germans into Austria and Czechoslovakia. During the very last phase of the war, Fascist Hungarian forces fought in Vienna, Breslau, Küstrin, and along the Oder River.

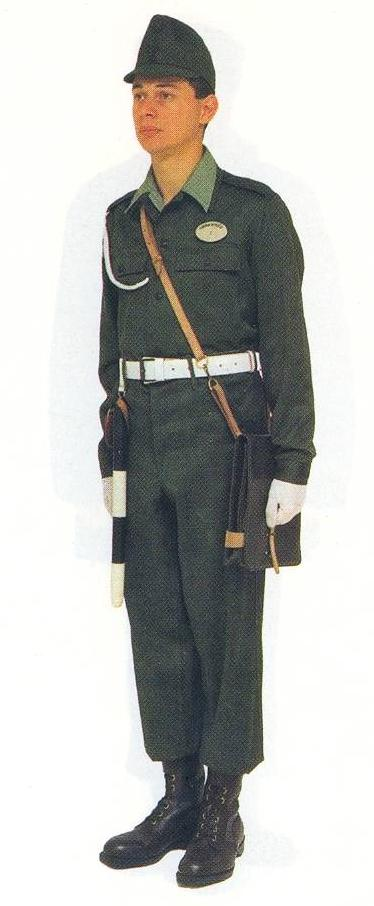
Uniform of the Hungarian People's Army (Magyar Néphadsereg): Hungarian military police summer uniform (enlisted, private, 1965–2005)

On 7 May 1945, General Alfred Jodl, the German Chief of Staff, signed the document of unconditional surrender for all German forces. Jodl signed this document during a ceremony in France. On 8 May, in accordance with the wishes of the Soviet Union, the ceremony was repeated in Germany by Field Marshal Wilhelm Keitel. On 11 June, the Allies agreed to make 9 May 1945 the official "Victory in Europe" day. Szálasi and many other pro-fascist Hungarians were captured and ultimately returned to Hungary's provisional government for trial.

=== Warsaw Pact ===
During the Socialist and the Warsaw Pact era (1947–1989), the Soviet Southern Group of Forces, 200,000 strong, was garrisoned in Hungary, complete with artillery, tank regiments, air force and missile troops (with nuclear weapons). It was, by all means, a very capable force but which had little contact with the local population. Between 1949 and 1955 there was also a huge effort to build a big Hungarian army. All procedures, disciplines, and equipment were exact copies of the Soviet Armed Forces in methods and material, but the huge costs collapsed the economy by 1956.

During the autumn 1956 revolution, the army was divided. When the opening demonstrations on 23 October 1956 were fired upon by ÁVH secret policemen, Hungarian troops sent to crush the demonstrators instead provided their arms to the latter or joined them outright. While most major military units in the capital were neutral during the fighting, thousands of rank-and-file soldiers went over to the Revolution or at least provided the revolutionaries with arms. Many significant military units went over to the uprising in full, such as the armored unit commanded by Colonel Pál Maléter which joined forces with the insurgents at the Battle of the Corvin Passage. However, there were 71 recorded clashes between the people and the army between 24 and 29 October in fifty localities; these were typically either defending certain military targets from rebel attack or fighting the insurgents outright, depending on the commander. When the Soviets crushed the Revolution on 4 November, the Army put up sporadic and disorganized resistance; lacking orders, many of their divisions were simply overpowered by the invading Soviets.

After the Revolution was crushed in Budapest, the Soviets took away most of the Hungarian People's Army's equipment, including dismantling the entire Hungarian Air Force, because a sizable percentage of the Army fought alongside the Hungarian revolutionaries. Three years later in 1959, the Soviets began helping rebuild the Hungarian People's Army and resupplying them with new arms and equipment as well as rebuilding the Hungarian Air Force. Satisfied that Hungary was stable and firmly committed once again to the Warsaw Pact, the Soviets offered the Hungarians a choice of withdrawal for all Soviet troops in the country. The new Hungarian leader, János Kádár, asked for all the 200,000 Soviet troops to stay, because it allowed the socialist Hungarian People's Republic to neglect its own draft-based armed forces, quickly leading to deterioration of the military. Large sums of money were saved that way and spent on feel-good socialist measures for the population, thus Hungary could become "the happiest barrack" in the Soviet Bloc. Limited modernization though, would happen from the mid-1970s onward to replace older stocks of military equipment with newer ones. Thus enabling the HPA, in a small way, to honor its Warsaw Pact commitments coupled with a mid-1980s organization which abolished divisions and replaced them with ground force brigades and a singular air force command.

The HPA was divided into the Ground and Air Forces. Until 1985, the Ground Forces were organized into:

- 5th Hungarian Army at Székesfehérvár
  - 7th Motor Rifle Division at Kiskunfélegyháza
  - 8th Motor Rifle Division at Zalaegerszeg
  - 9th Motor Rifle Division at Kaposvár
  - 11th Tank Division at Tata
- 3rd Army Corps at Cegléd
  - 4th Motor Rifle Division at Gyöngyös
  - 15th Motor Rifle Division at Nyíregyháza

Air Forces Headquarters at Veszprém

- 11th Air-defense Artillery Brigade at Budapest, after 1977 Érd
- 1st Air Defense Division at Veszprém
  - 47th Fighter Regiment at Pápa
  - 31st Fighter Regiment at Taszár
  - 104th Air-defense Artillery Regiment Nagytarcsa after Szabadszállás
- 2nd Air Defense Division at Miskolc
  - 59th Fighter Regiment at Szolnok
  - 105th Air-defense Artillery Regiment at Miskolc

Training for conscripts was poor and most of those drafted were actually used as a free labour force (esp. railway track construction and agricultural work) after just a few weeks of basic rifle training. Popular opinion grew very negative towards the Hungarian People's Army and most young men tried to avoid the draft with bogus medical excuses.

=== The 1990s and Twenty-first century ===
In 1997, Hungary spent about 123 billion HUF (US$560 million) on defence. Hungary became a member of NATO on 12 March 1999. Hungary provided airbases and support for NATO's air campaign against Serbia and has provided military units to serve in Kosovo as part of the NATO-led KFOR operation. Hungary has sent a 300 strong logistics unit to Iraq in order to help the US occupation with armed transport convoys, though public opinion opposed the country's participation in the war. One soldier was killed in action due to a roadside bomb in Iraq. The parliament refused to extend the one year mandate of the logistics unit and all troops have returned from Iraq as of mid-January 2005. Hungarian troops were still in Afghanistan as of early 2005 as part of the International Security Assistance Force. There were reports that Hungary would most probably replace its old UAZ 4x4 vehicles with the modern Iveco LMV types, but it never happened. Hungarian forces deploy the Gepárd anti-materiel rifle, which is a heavy 12.7 mm portable gun. This equipment is also in use by the Turkish and Croatian armed forces, among other armies.

In a significant move for modernization, Hungary decided in 2001 to lease 14 JAS 39 Gripen fighter aircraft (the contract includes 2 dual-seater airplanes and 12 single-seaters as well as ground maintenance facilities, a simulator, and training for pilots and ground crews) for 210 billion HUF (about 800 million EUR). Five Gripens (3 single-seaters and 2 two-seaters) arrived in Kecskemét on 21 March 2006, expected to be transferred to the Hungarian Air Force on March 30. 10 or 14 more aircraft of this type might follow up in the coming years.

In early 2015, Hungary and Sweden extended the lease-program for another 10 years with a total of 32,000 flight-hours (95% increase) for only a 45% increase in cost.

=== Zrínyi 2026 Modernization Program ===
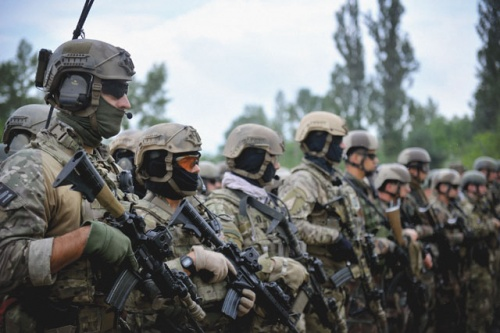
Hungarian soldiers on exercise

In 2016, PM Orbán confirmed that Hungary will meet its NATO obligations by increasing its defense spending to about 2 percent of GDP. The official government "Zrínyi 2026" program of upgrading military equipment is scheduled to last until 2026, but the timeline has been expanded until 2030–2032. New purchased and ordered equipment so far includes new CZ BREN 2 assault rifles (to be manufactured locally), helicopters, transport and trainer aircraft, tanks, armored vehicles, radars and surface-to-air missiles.

Hungary ordered 20 H145M and 16 H225M in 2018. All H145M aircraft had been delivered by the end of 2021. H225M are expected to arrive between 2023 and 2024.

In early 2019 the first batch of Carl Gustaf M4s has arrived, starting to replace the old RPG-7s.

In late 2019, Hungary signed a contract for 44 Leopard 2 A7+ tanks and 24 PzH 2000 howitzers for €300 million to be delivered in 2021 to 2025. In 2020 Hungary and Rheinmetall Group have signed a contract to start manufacturing the Lynx infantry fighting vehicle family in Hungary. Estimated to start arriving around 2024–2025, the first batch of 200+ Lynx vehicles are expected to reach operational capability in the Hungarian Defence Forces by 2026-2027

In 2020 the Hungarian airforce ordered two KC-390 cargo and tanker aircraft to be delivered in 2023 and 2024. This year Kongsberg and Raytheon were awarded a 410 million EUR contract by Hungary for NASAMS surface-to air missile systems. 11 ELM-2084 radars were also ordered in late 2020. The Mistral SAM system has been upgraded: new M3 missiles were purchased and both the launchers and the MCPs were modernized.

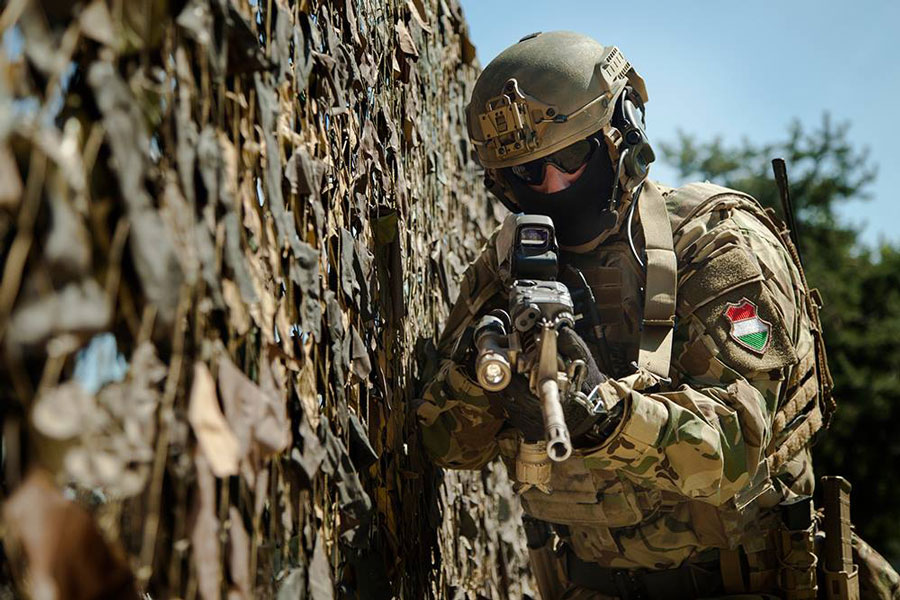
Hungarian special forces

In 2021 Spike LR2 anti-tank missiles has been ordered, mainly for the Lynx IFVs. In August 2021 contract has been signed with SAAB to upgrade the Hungarian Gripen fleet to the MS20 Block 2 standard. This upgrade greatly increases both Gripen's combat and communication capabilities, as well as access to a wide range of weapons that can be integrated on Hungarian Air Force Gripen fighters. The cutting edge IRIS-T missile has been also ordered in 2021. Meteor and GBU-49 is planned to be purchased for the Gripen's arsenal. There is a plan to also set up a second fighter squadron, but it has not been confirmed.

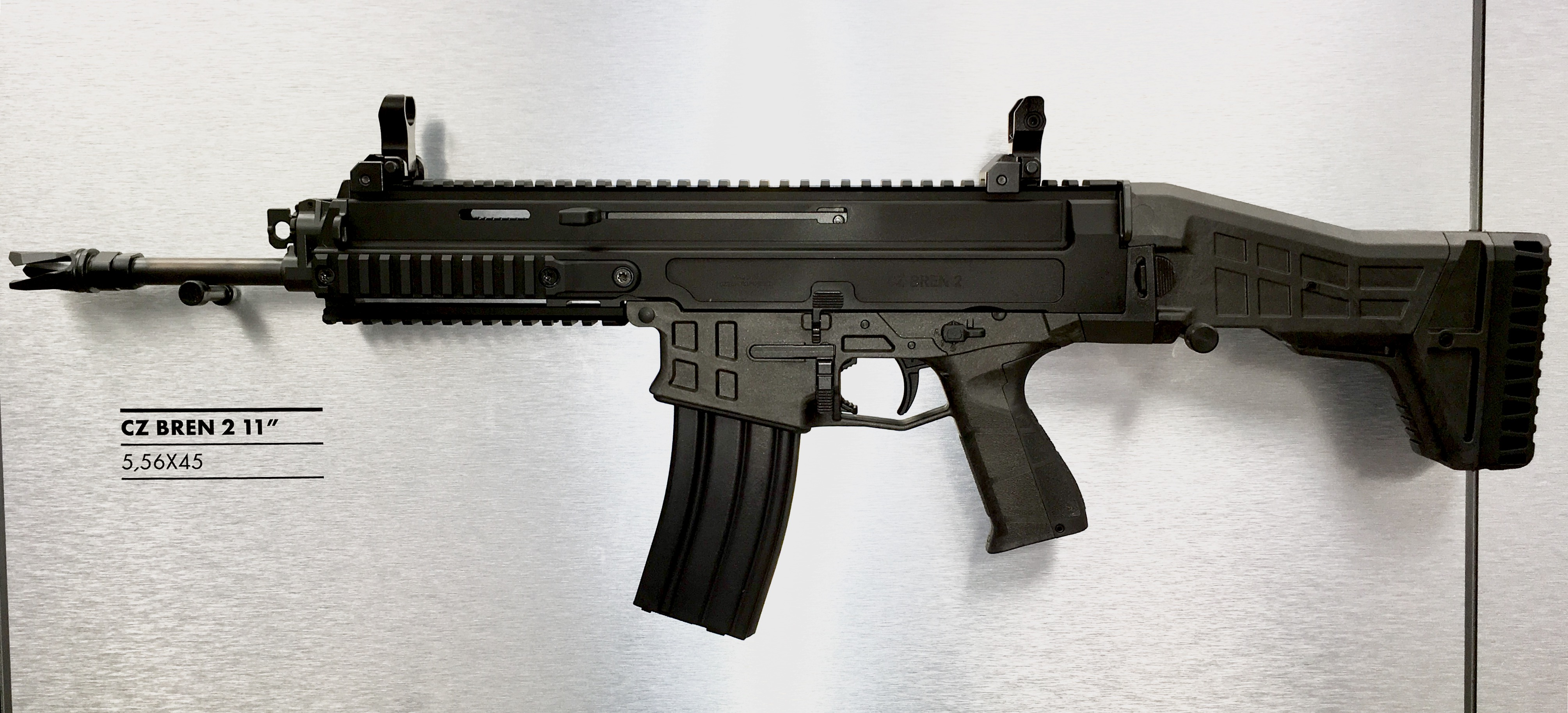
CZ BREN 2 - standard-issue rifle of the Hungarian Armed Forces

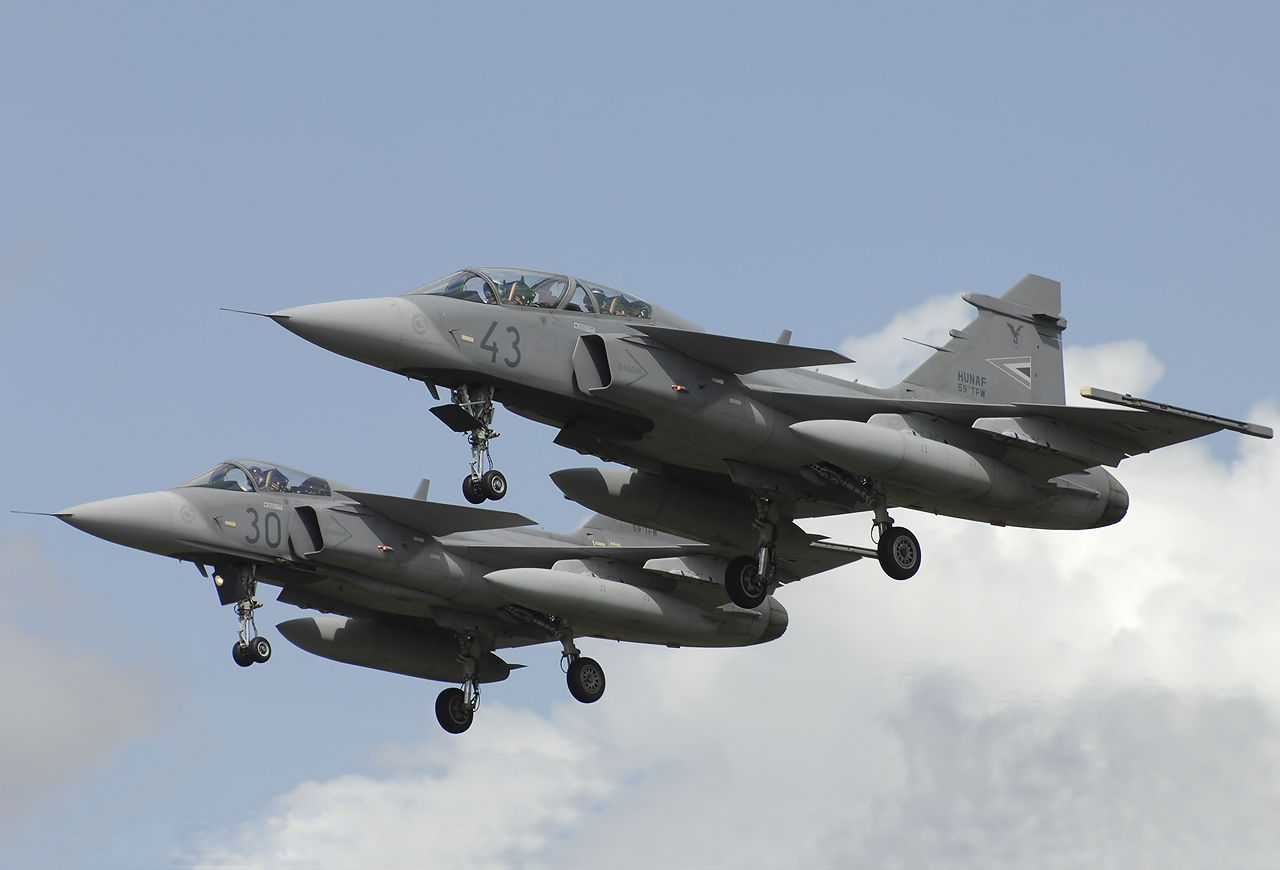
Gripen fighters of Hungary

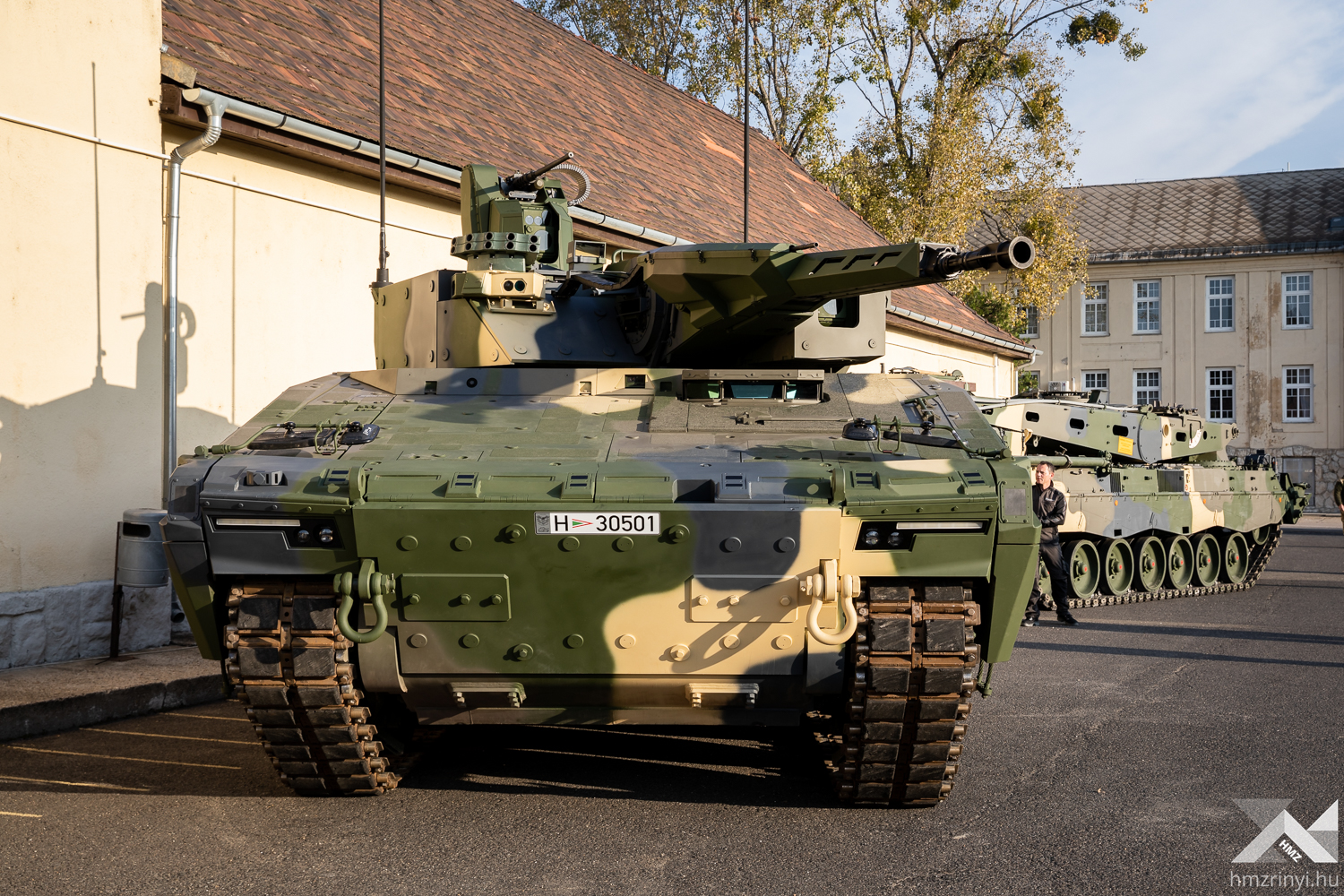
Hungarian Lynx IFV

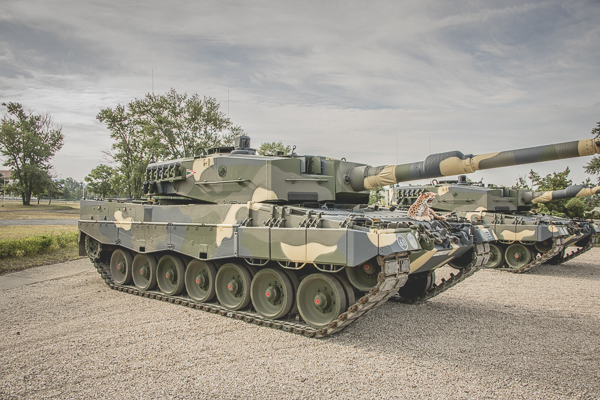
Hungarian Leopard 2A4

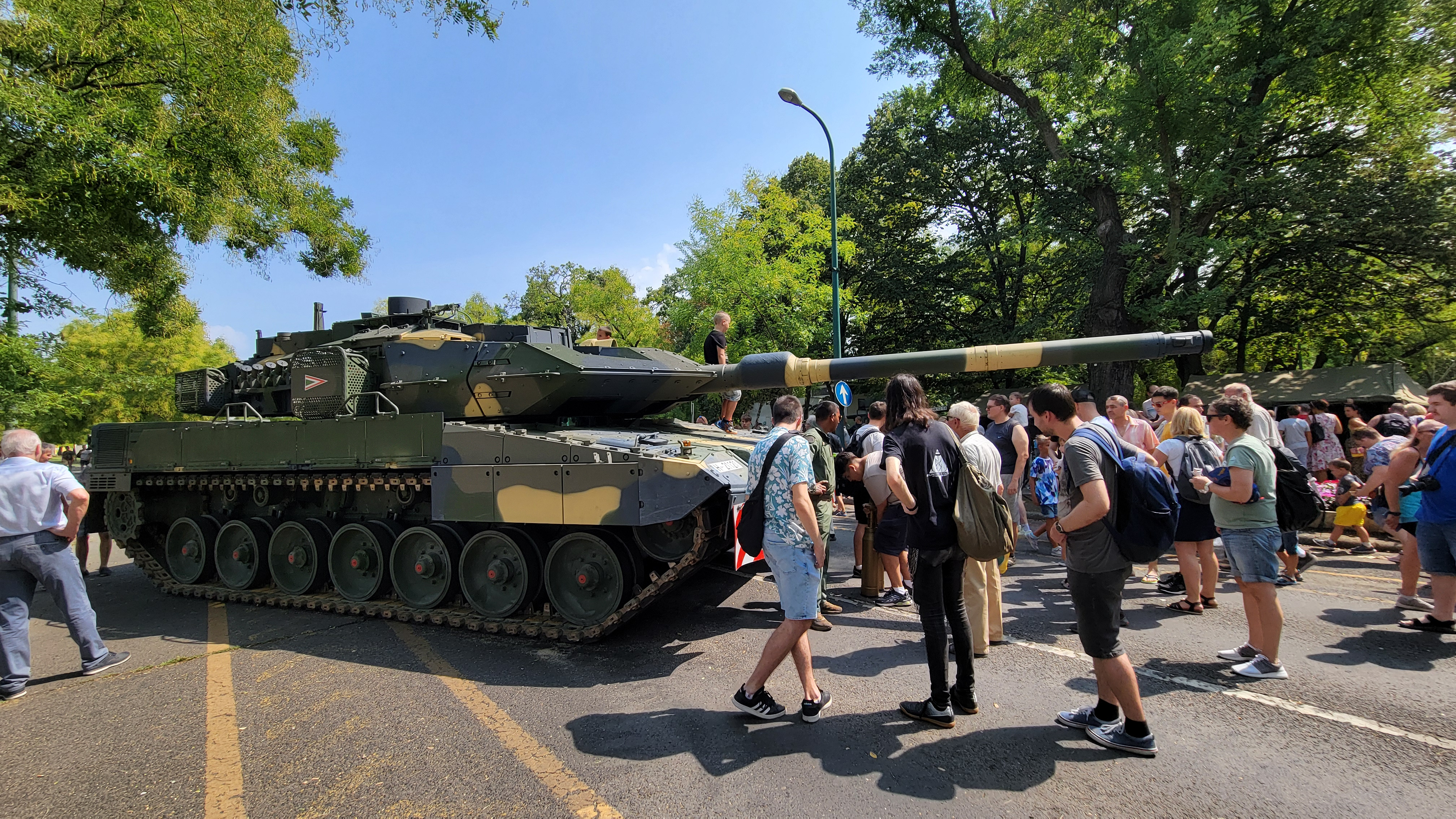
Hungarian LEOPARD 2A7+

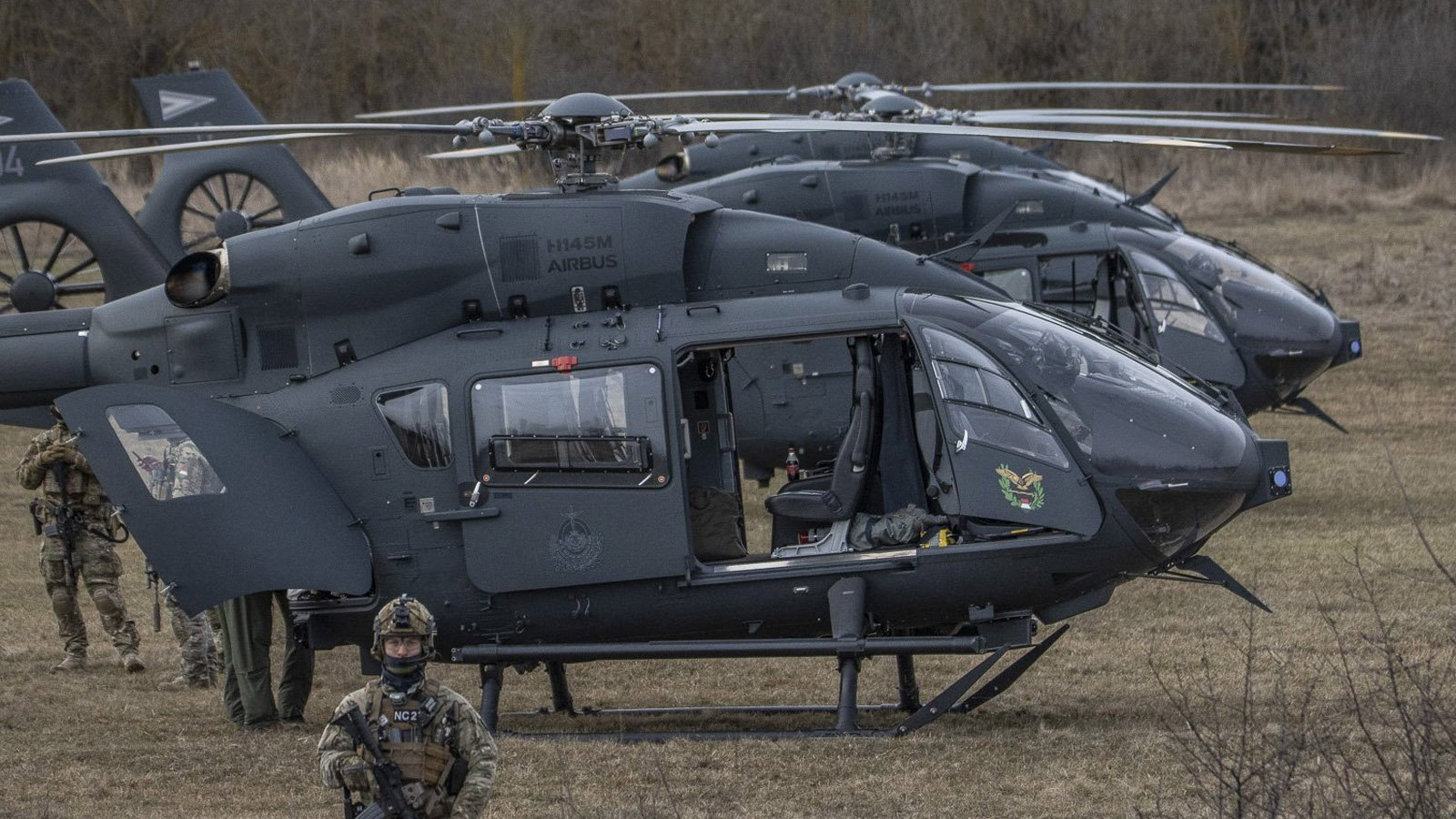
Hungarian H145M on exercise

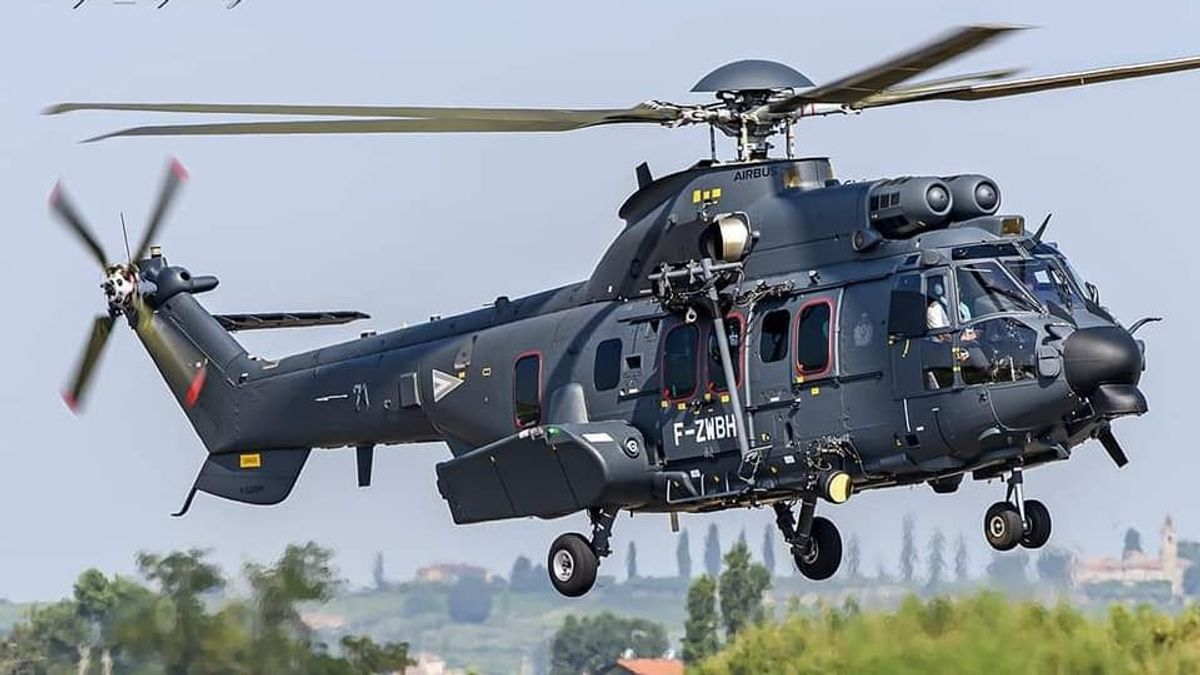
Hungarian H225M

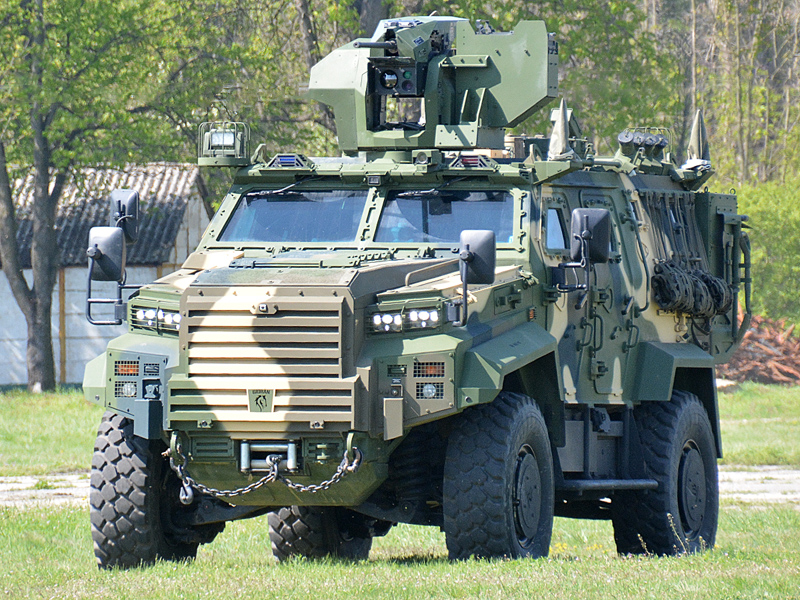
Hungarian "Gidrán" MRAP

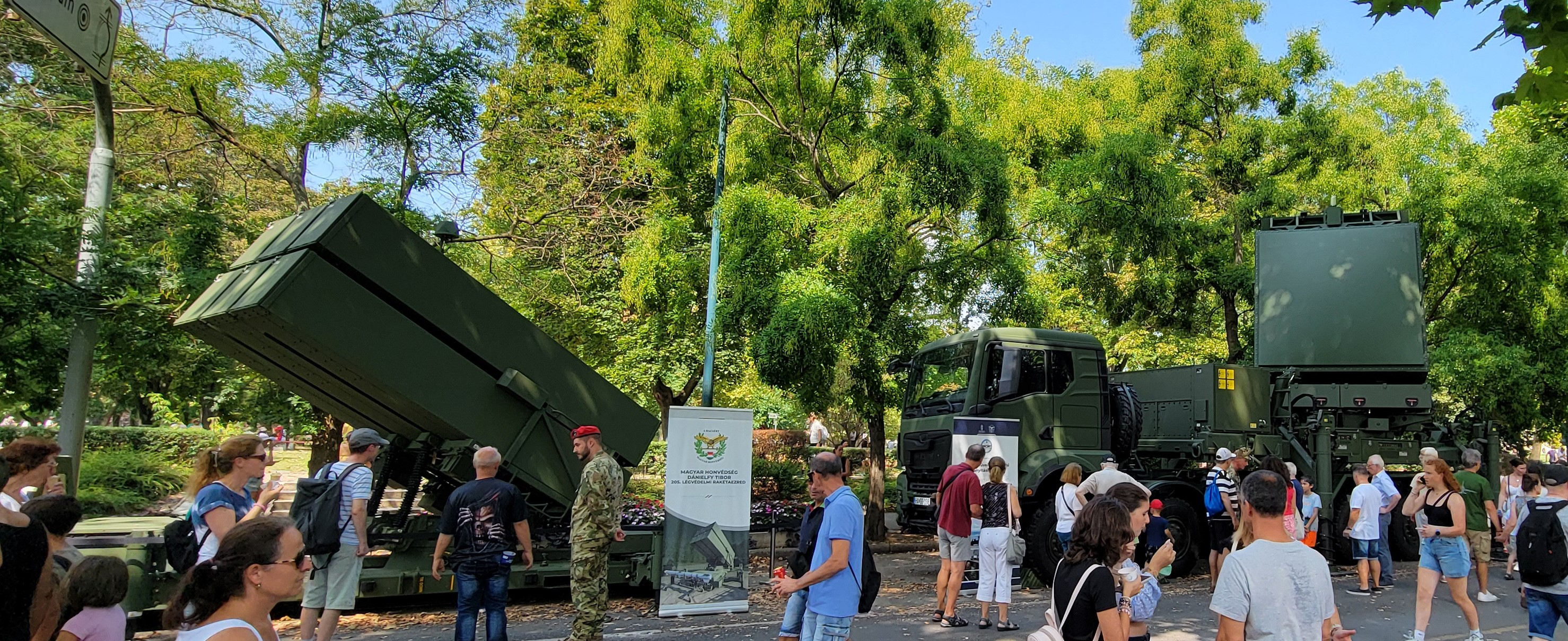
Hungarian NASAMS

== Current international missions ==
The Hungarian Defence Forces currently takes part in the following international missions:

- EUFOR Operation Althea
  - HDF EUFOR Althea Contingent, Bosnia and Herzegovina
- Kosovo Force
  - HDF KFOR Contingent, Kosovo
- United Nations Peacekeeping Force in Cyprus
  - HDF UNFICYP Contingent, Cyprus

Other missions include: United Nations Interim Force in Lebanon, EUNAVFOR MED, MINURSO and EUMM

== See also ==
- Military history of Hungary
- Military ranks of Hungary
- Defence Force
