= Hungarian Defence Forces General Staff Scientific Research Centre =

Research institute in Hungary

The Hungarian Defence Forces General Staff Scientific Research Centre (Hungarian: Honvéd Vezérkar Tudományos Kutatóhely) is a division of the Hungarian Defence Forces (HDF) and operates directly under the General Staff.

== Strategy ==
The center plays a crucial role in supporting the scientific and professional development of the HDF and its subordinate military entities. Its primary functions include assisting in commander decision-making, facilitating scientific education, and providing continuous education through its operational system. Additionally, it offers valuable scientific forecasts related to operational areas, military infrastructure, and research and development activities.

== Main areas ==
The Hungarian Defence Forces General Staff Scientific Research Centre is responsible for various tasks related to scientific activities. These include organizing scientific projects, ensuring the completion of research studies, and supporting the innovation of research results. The center also focuses on scientific education and continuous professional development, providing necessary scientific information, promoting scientific cooperation, organizing scientific events and overseeing the publication of various scientific publications.
