= Ranks of the Hungarian People's Army =

The Military ranks of the Hungarian People's Army were the military insignia used by the Hungarian People's Army. The ranks replaced the Military ranks of the Kingdom of Hungary in 1945, following the abolition of the monarchy. The ranks were replaced by the Military ranks of Hungary, following the end of socialism in Hungary.

== Commissioned officer ranks ==
The rank insignia of commissioned officers.

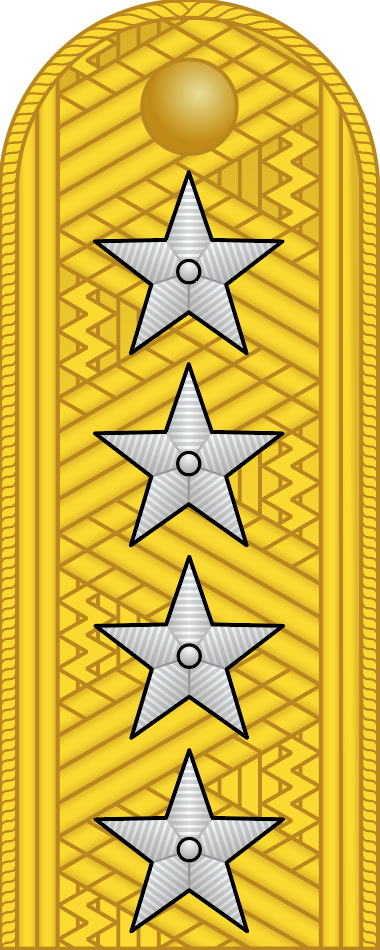
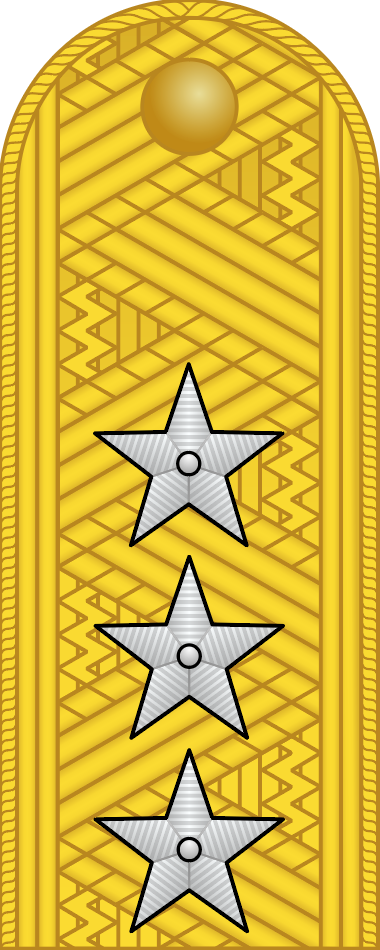
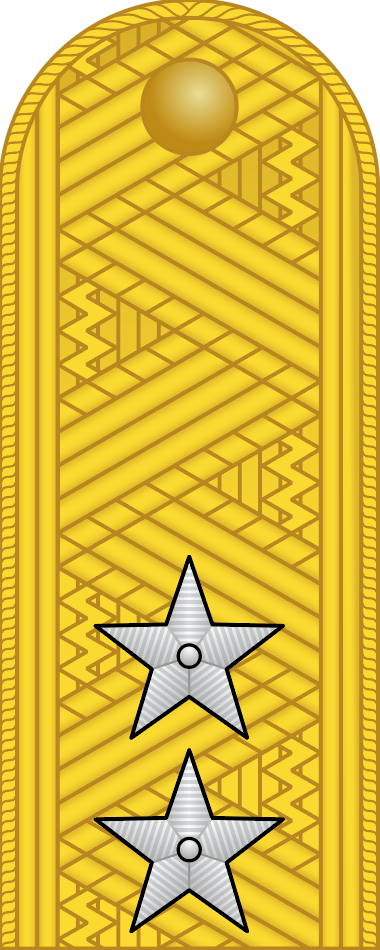
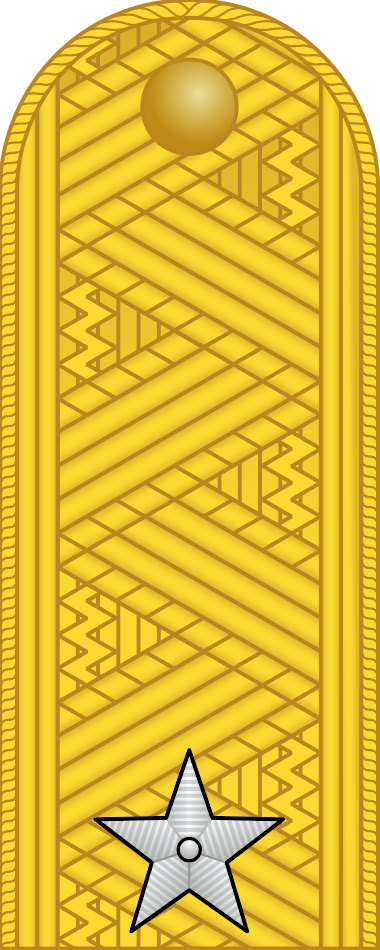
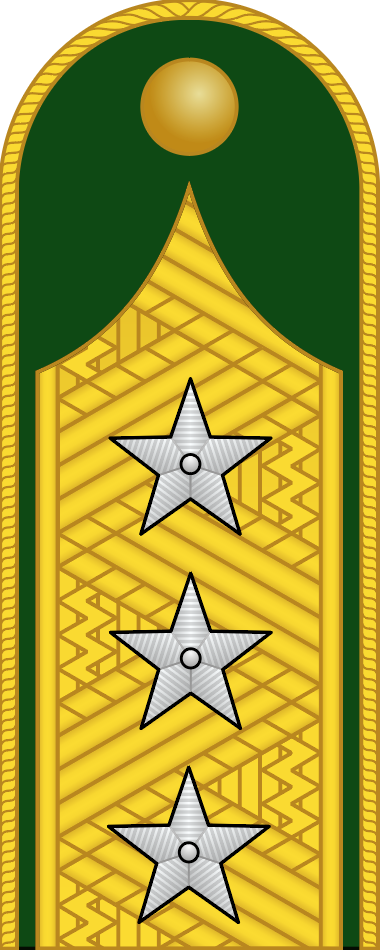
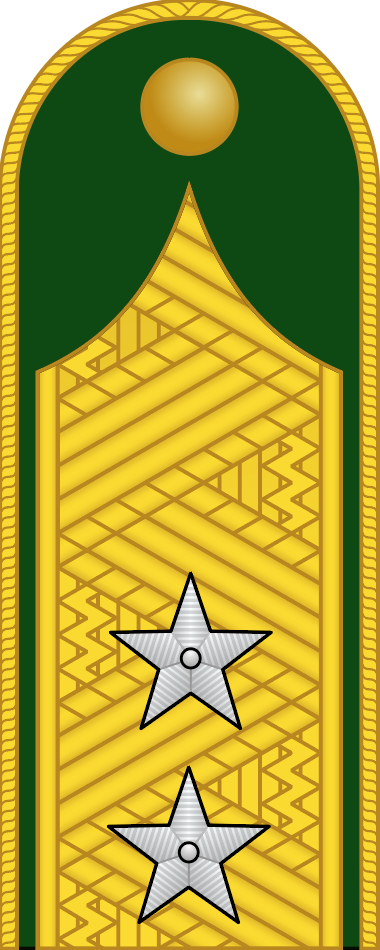
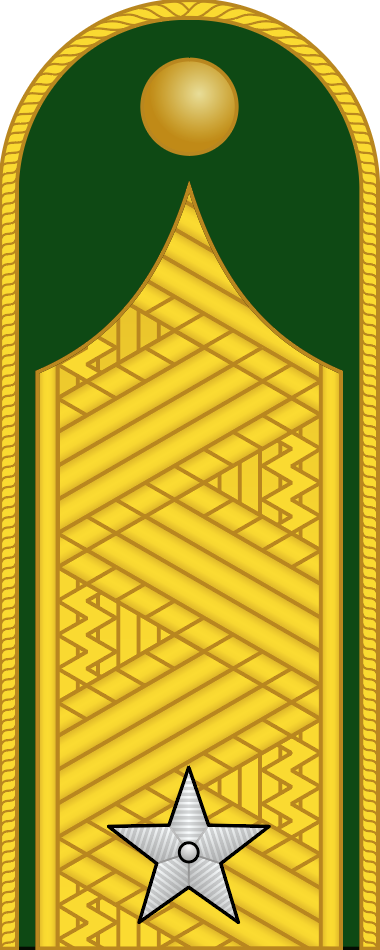
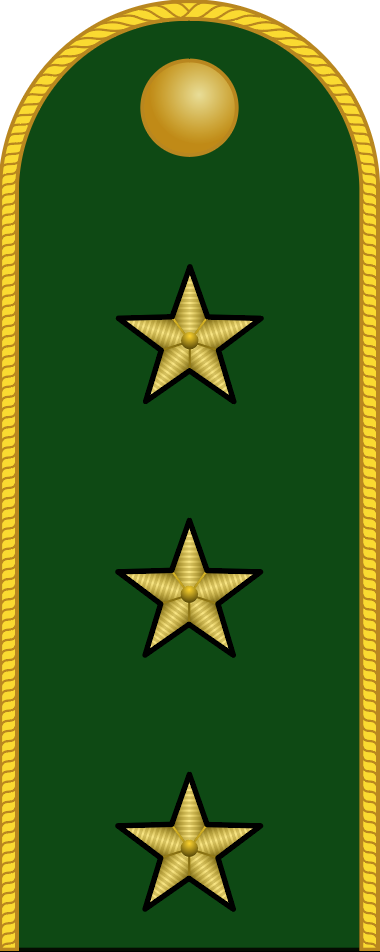
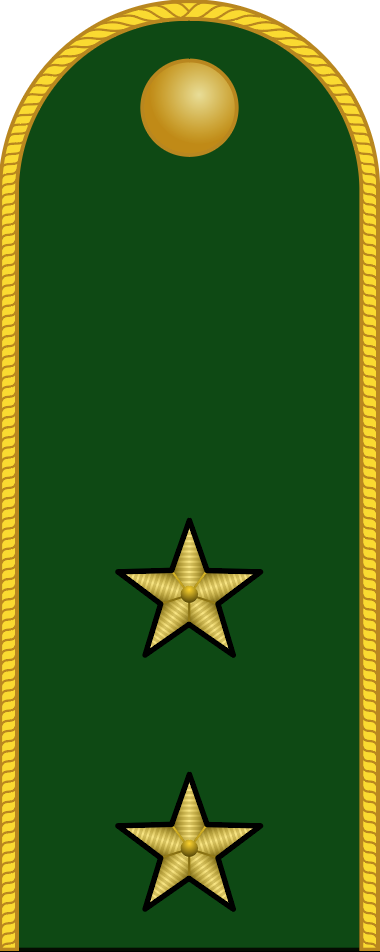
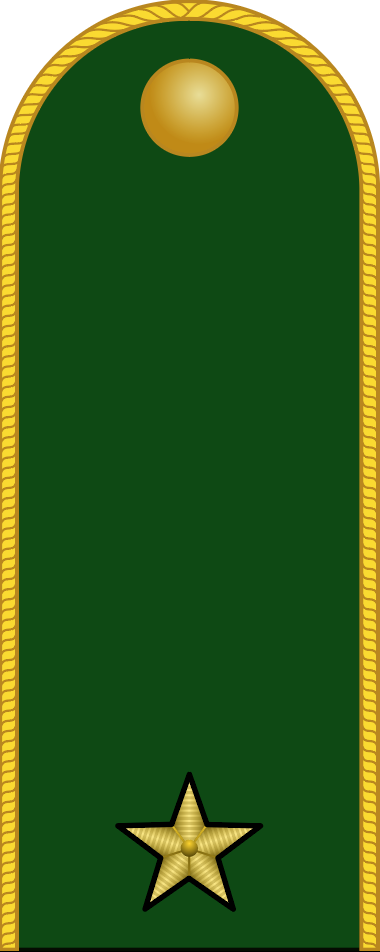
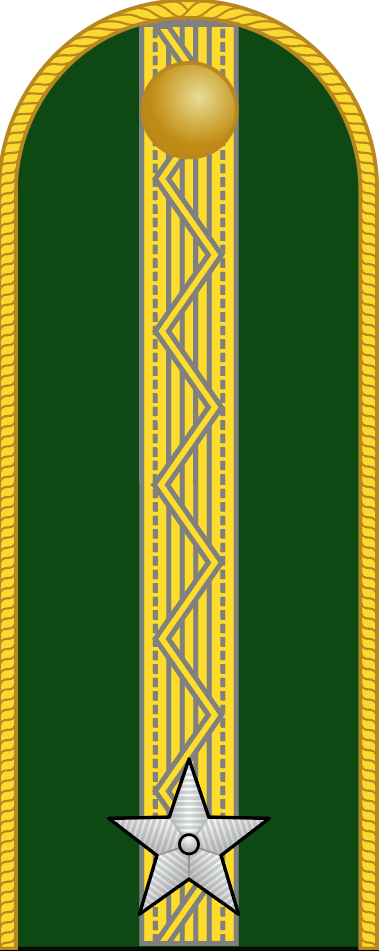
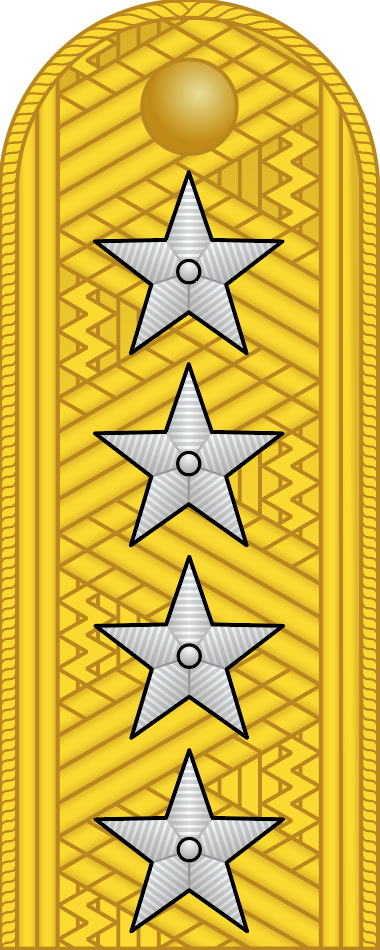
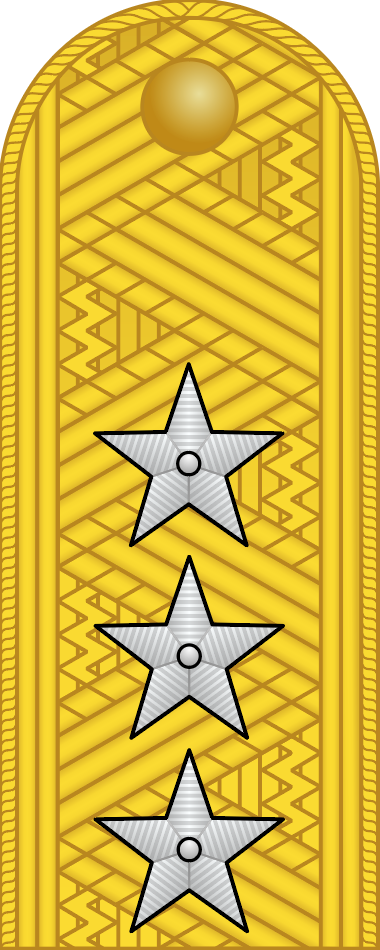
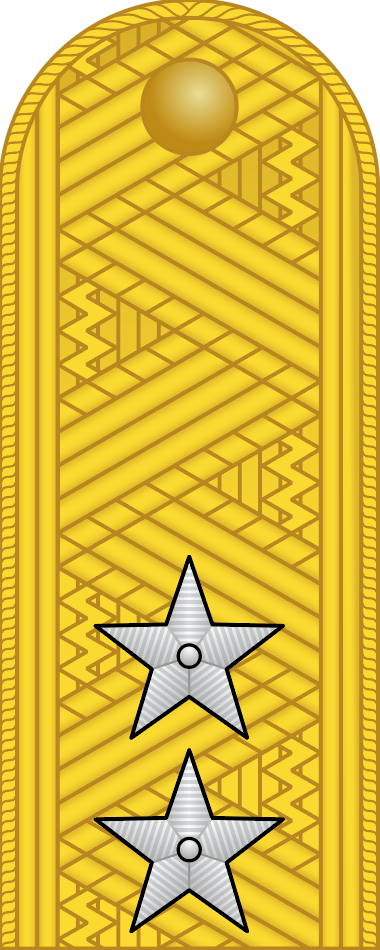
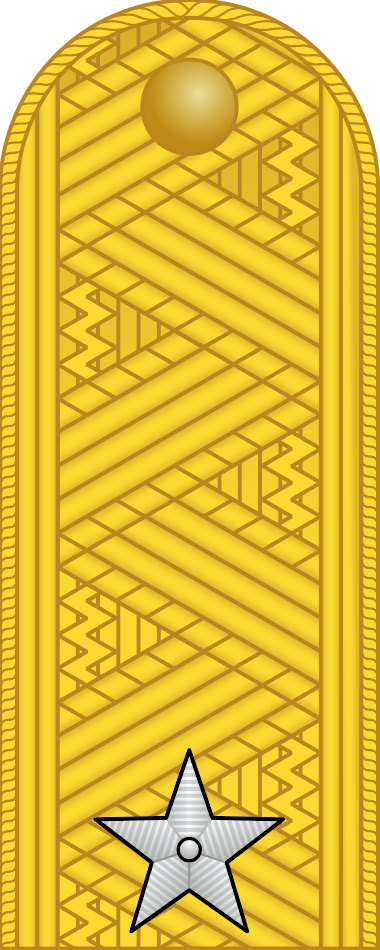
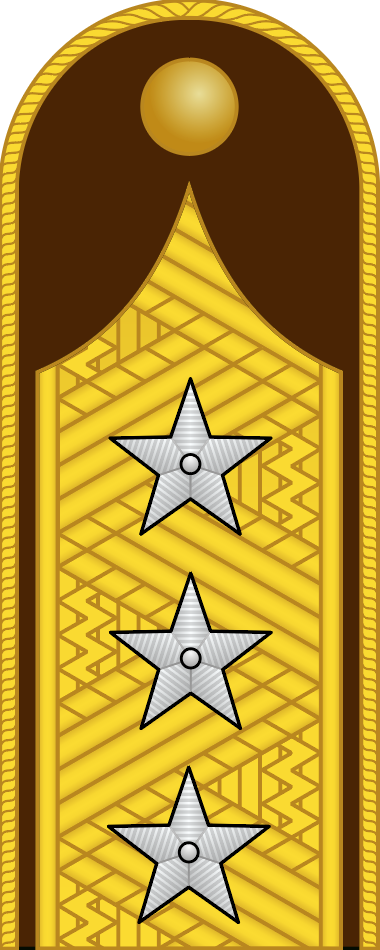
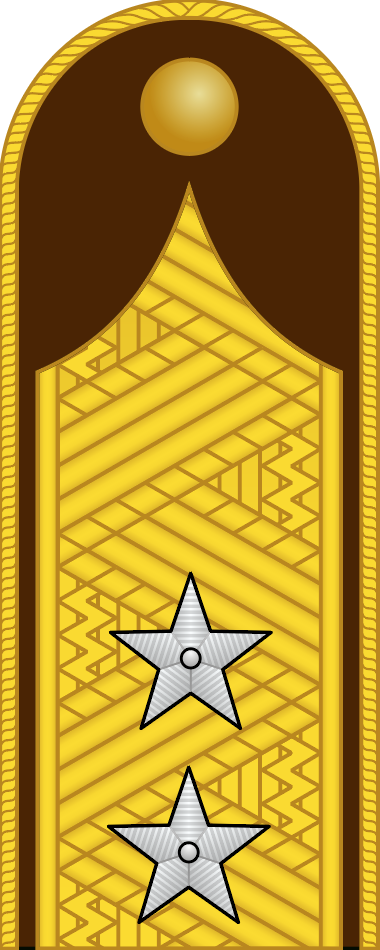
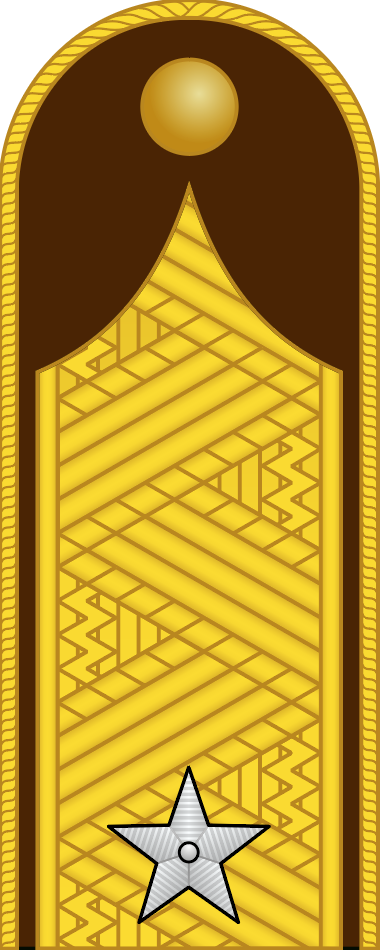
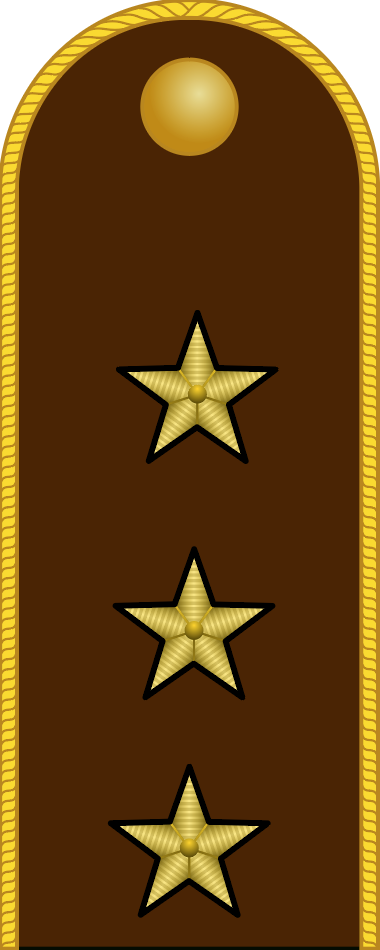
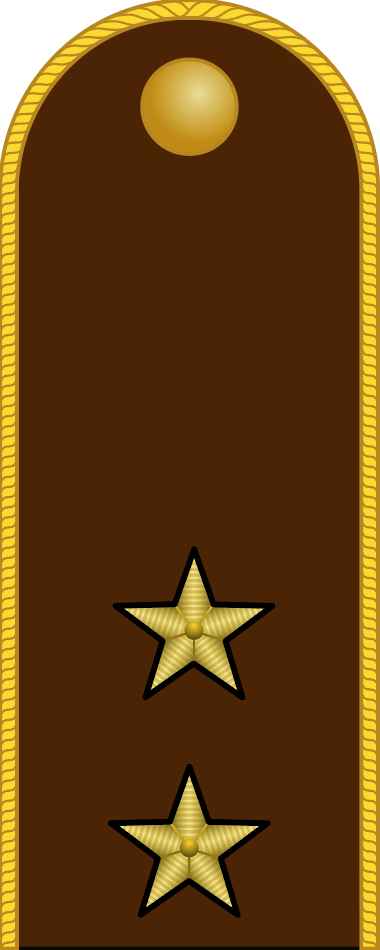
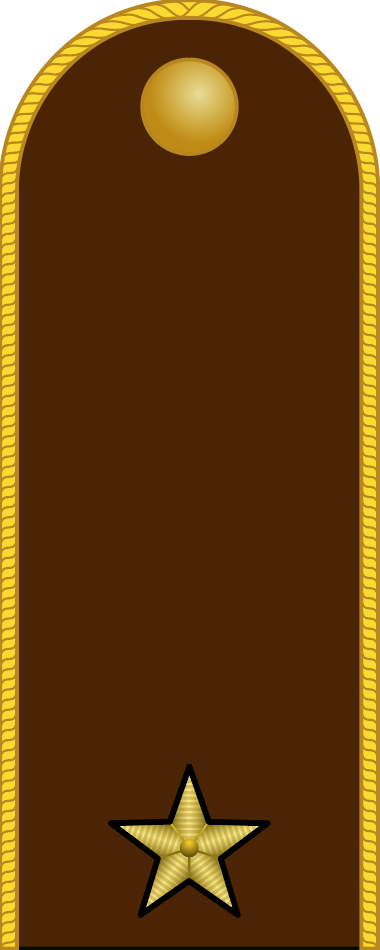
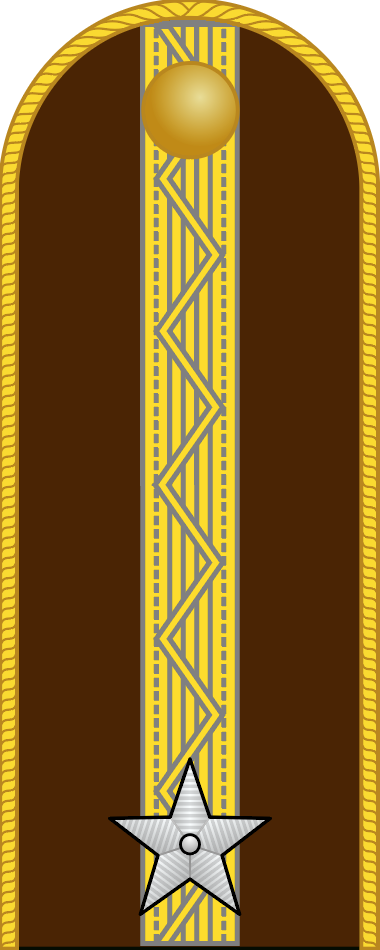
Rank group	General / flag officers				Senior officers			Junior officers
1945-1951
1945-1951		Vezérezredes	Altábornagy	Vezérőrnagy	Ezredes	Alezredes	Őrnagy	Százados	Főhadnagy	Hadnagy	Alhadnagy
1951-1957
1951-1957	Hadseregtábornok	Vezérezredes	Altábornagy	Vezérőrnagy	Ezredes	Alezredes	Őrnagy	Százados	Főhadnagy	Hadnagy	Alhadnagy
1957-1965
1957-1965	Hadseregtábornok	Vezérezredes	Altábornagy	Vezérőrnagy	Ezredes	Alezredes	Őrnagy	Százados	Főhadnagy	Hadnagy	Alhadnagy
1965-1990
1965-1990	Hadseregtábornok	Vezérezredes	Altábornagy	Vezérőrnagy	Ezredes	Alezredes	Őrnagy	Százados	Főhadnagy	Hadnagy	Alhadnagy
Rank group	General / flag officers				Senior officers			Junior officers

== Other ranks ==
The rank insignia of non-commissioned officers and enlisted personnel.

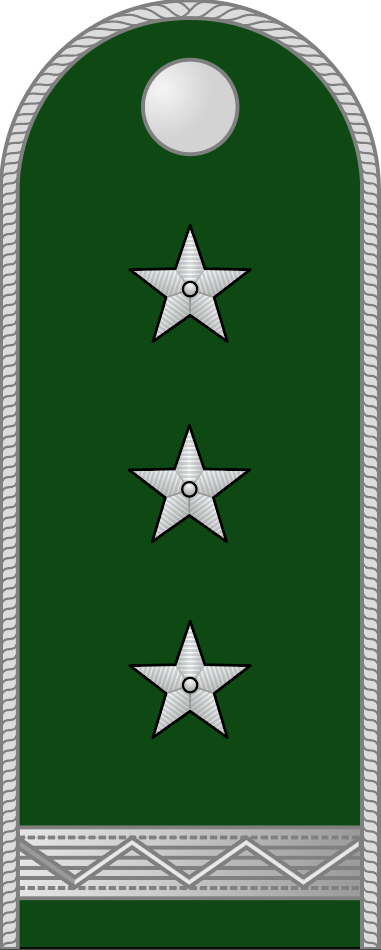
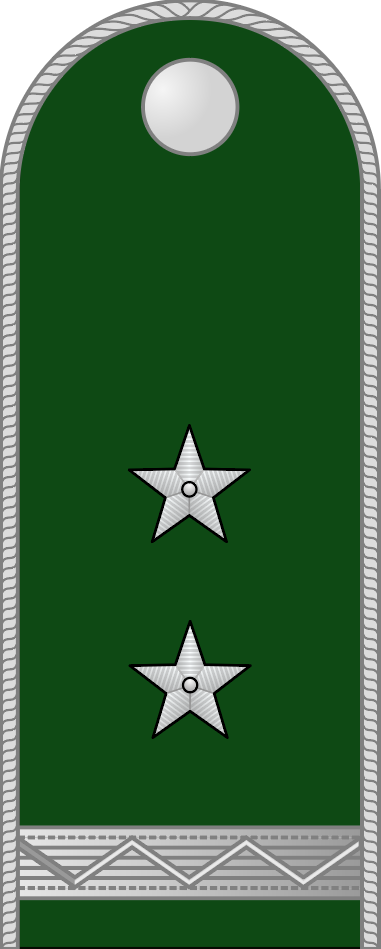
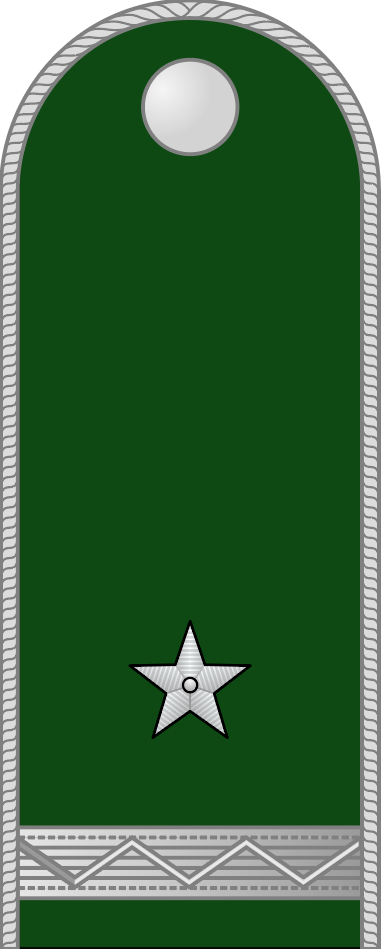
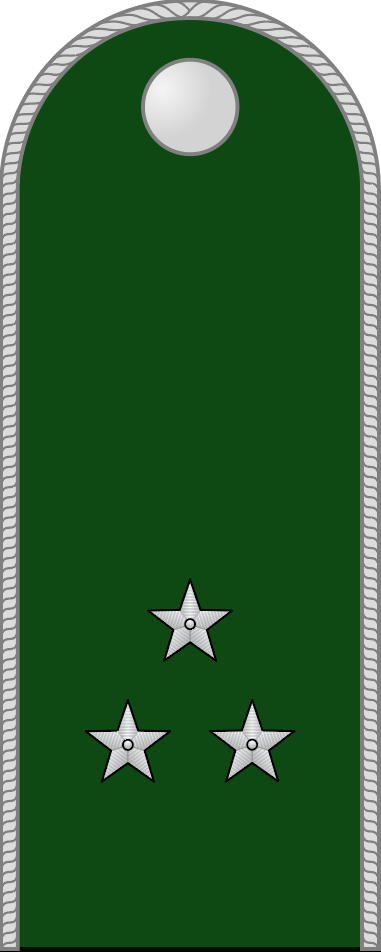
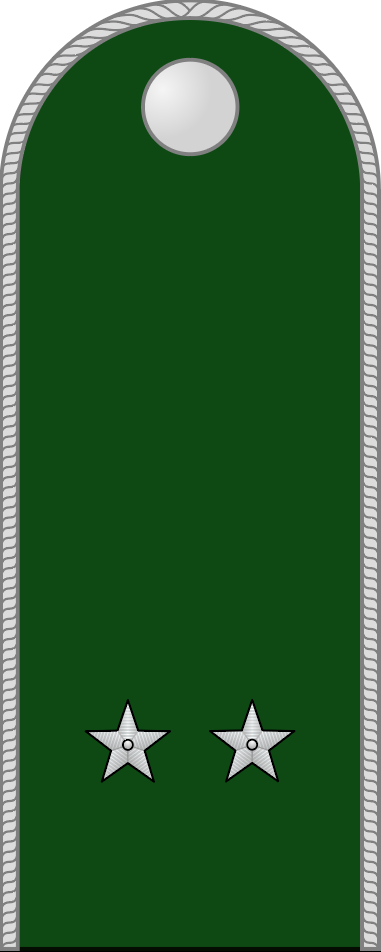
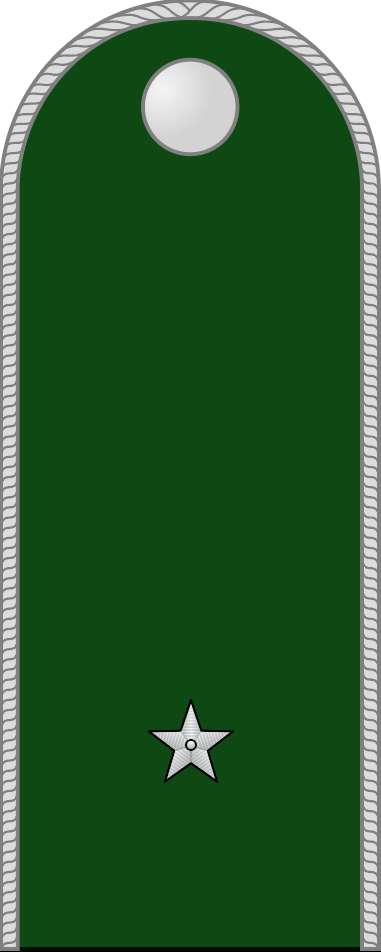
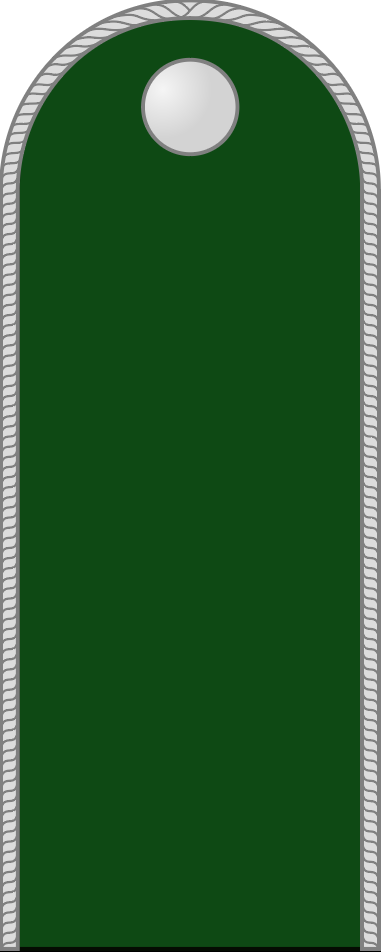
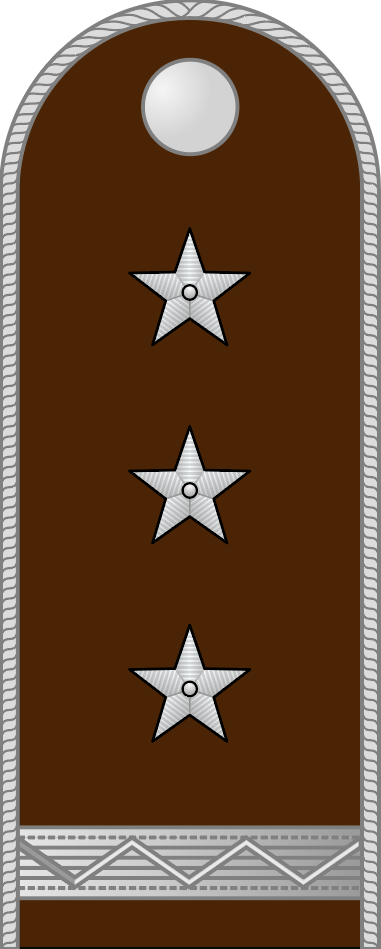
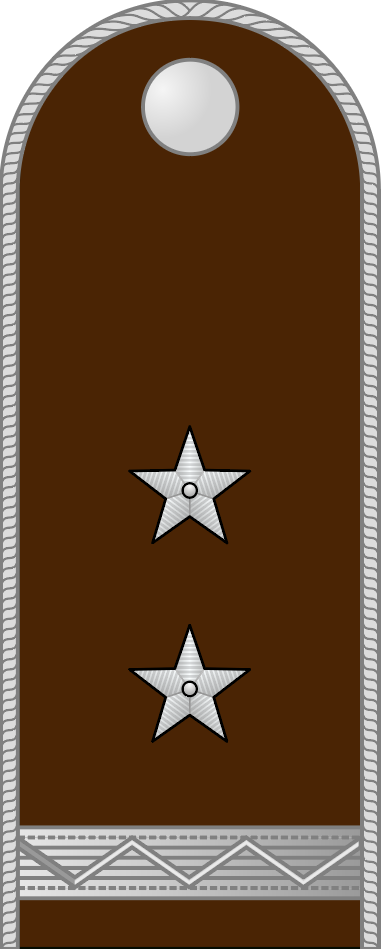
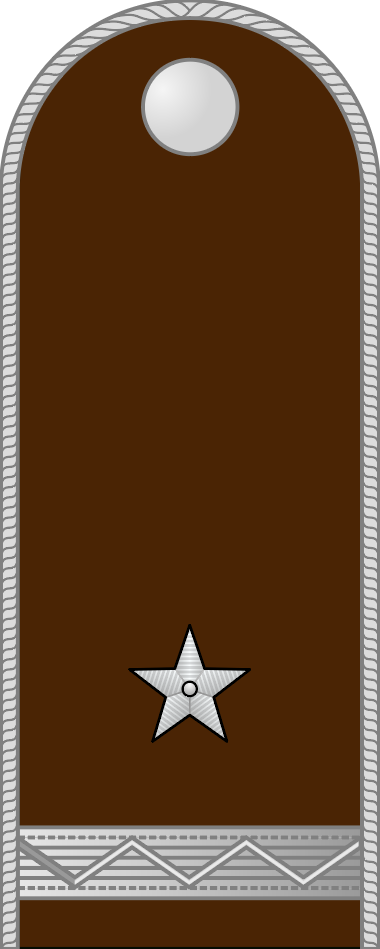
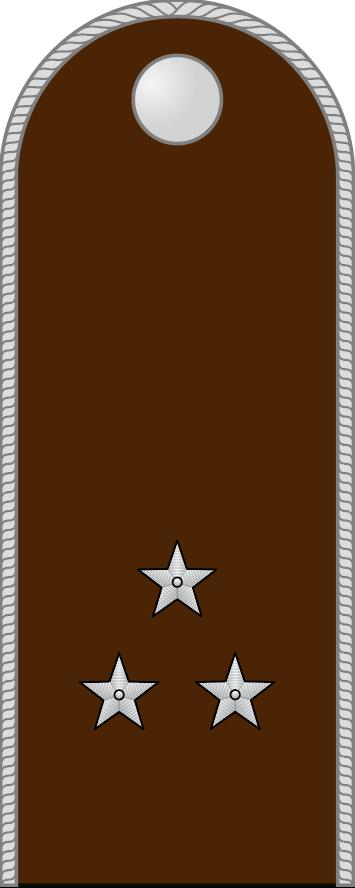
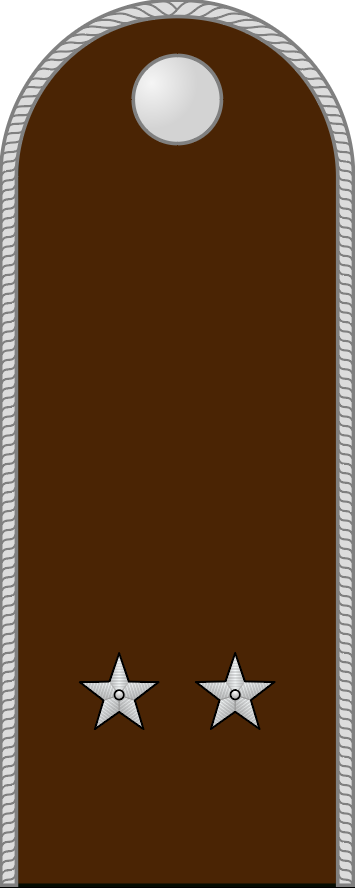
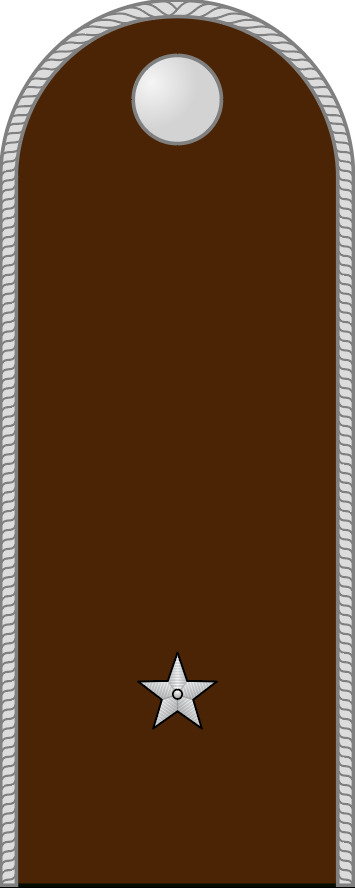
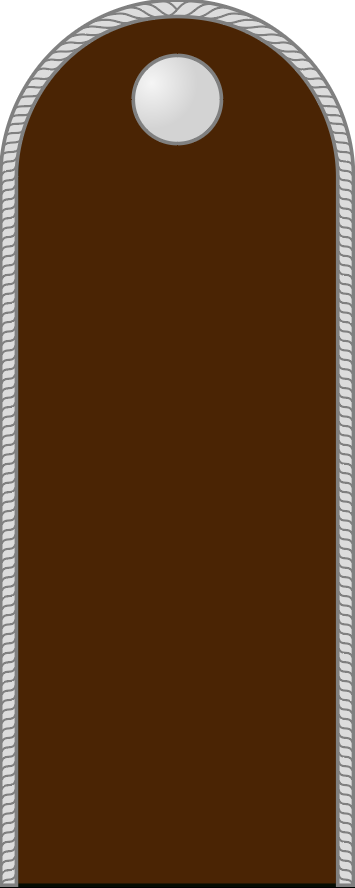
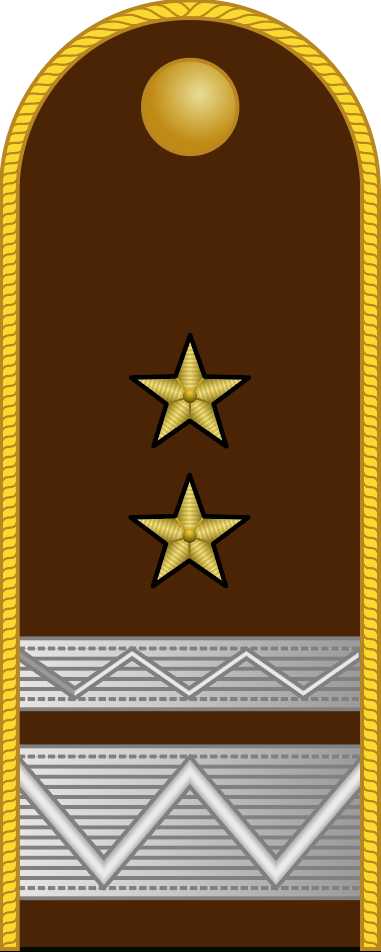
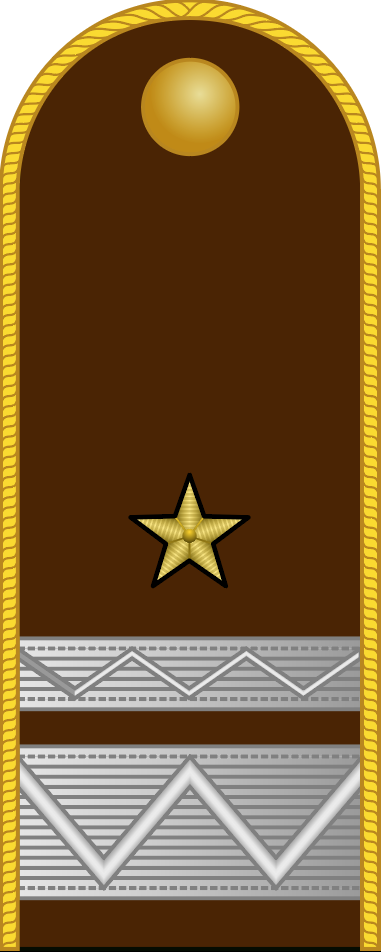
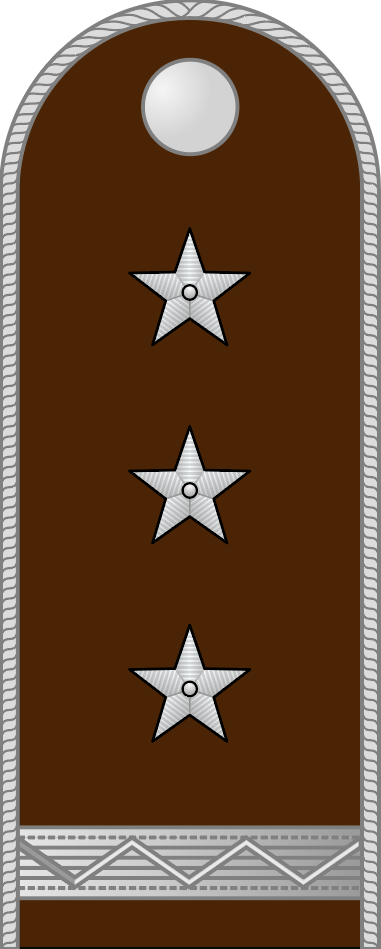
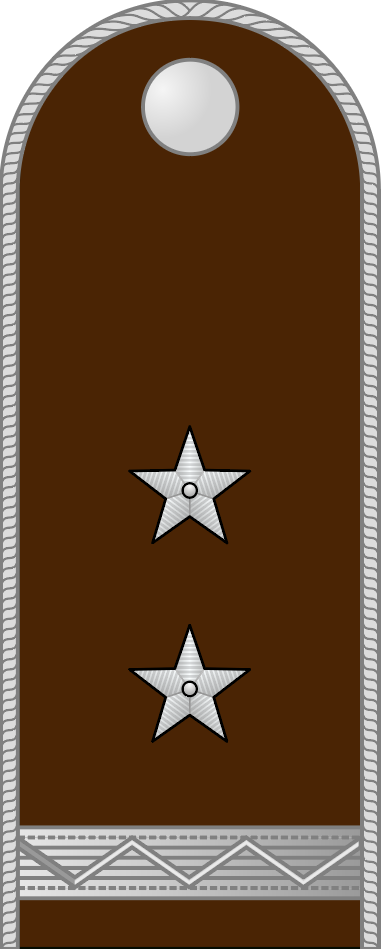
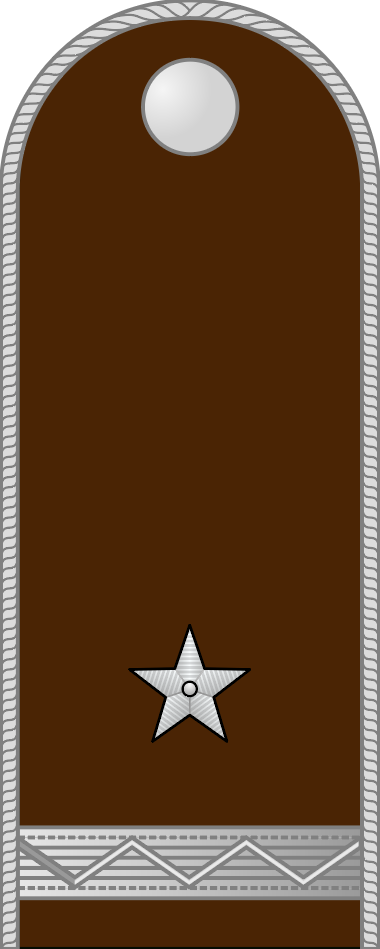
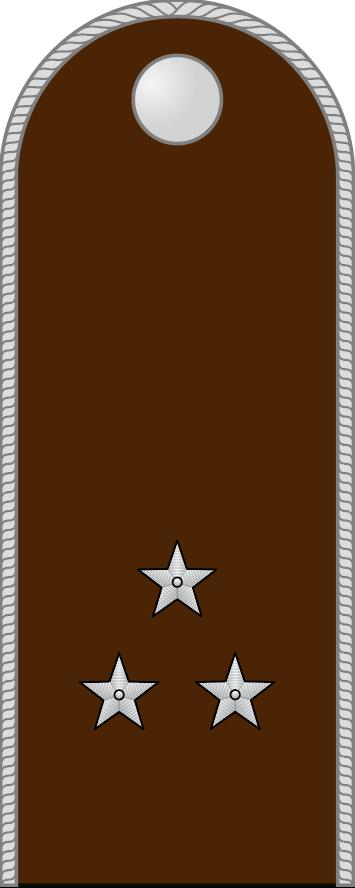
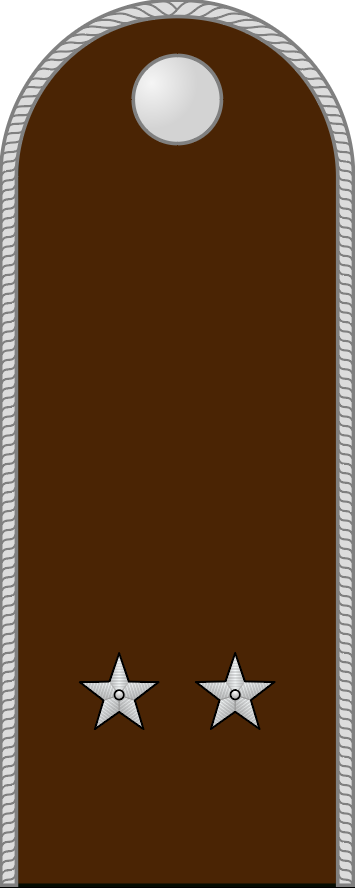
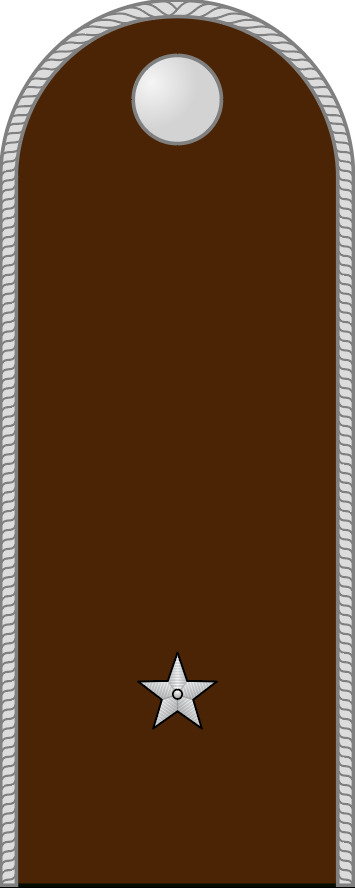
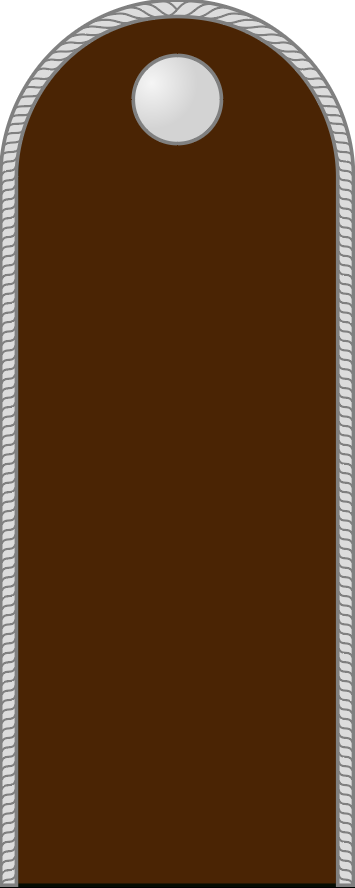
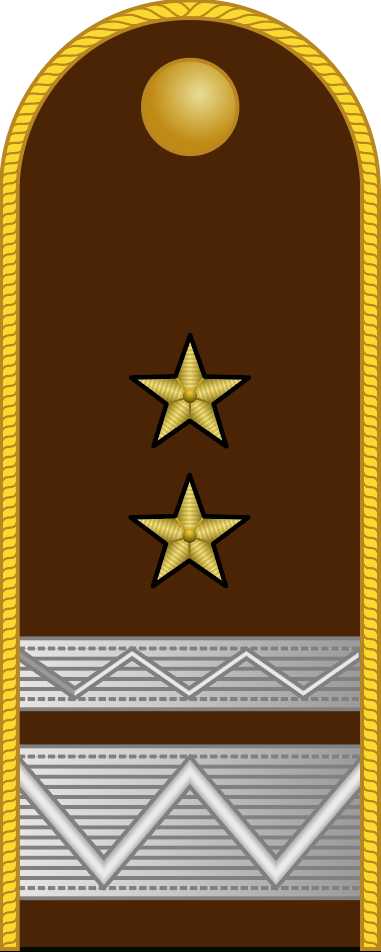
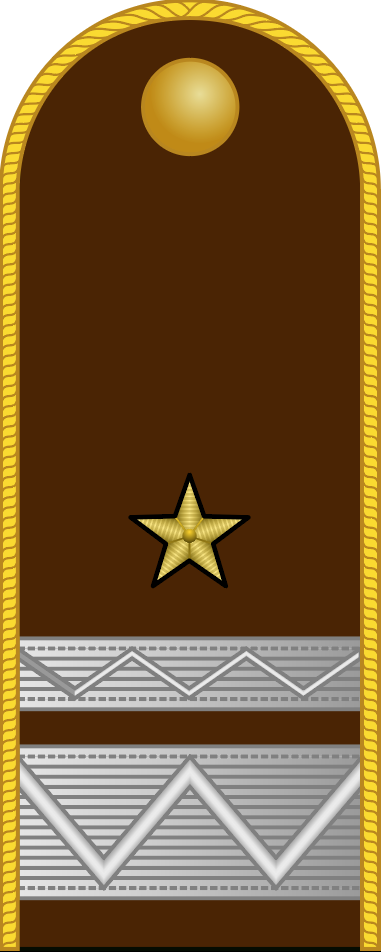
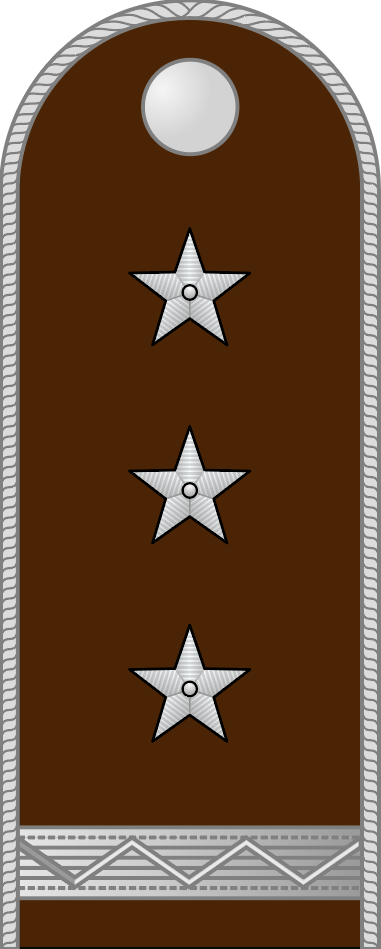
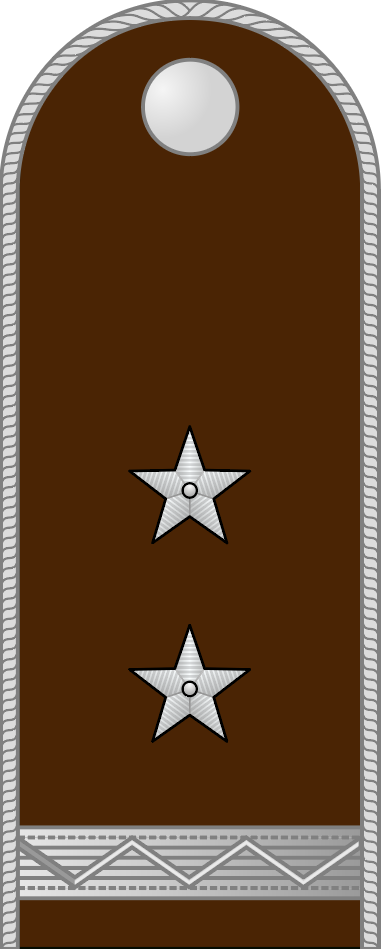
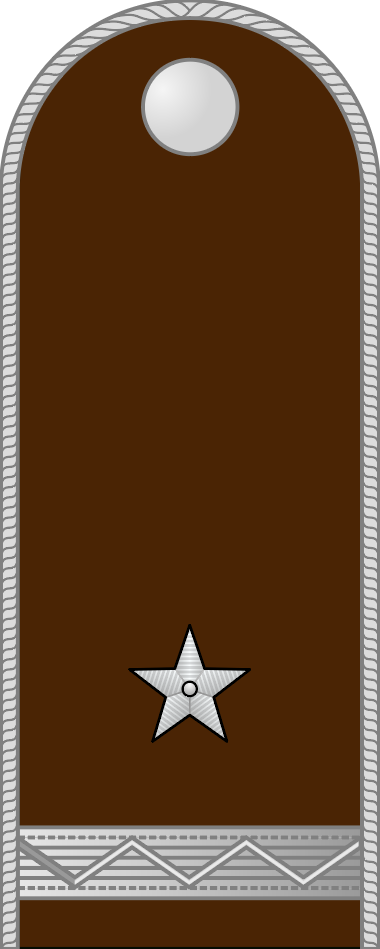
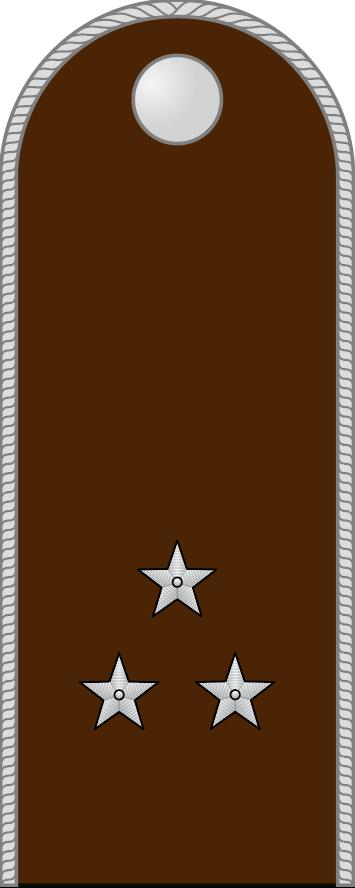
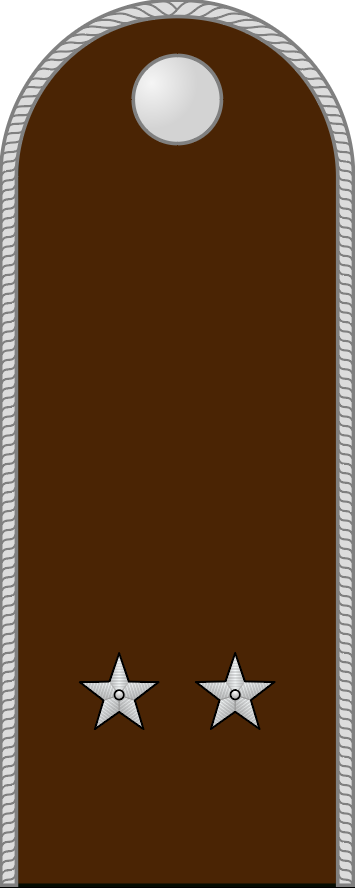
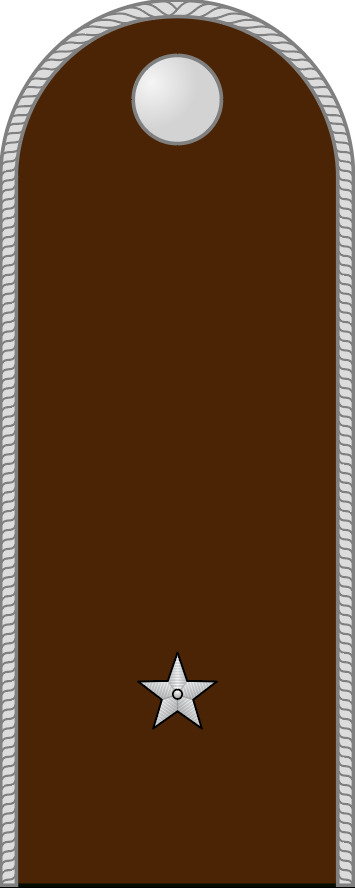
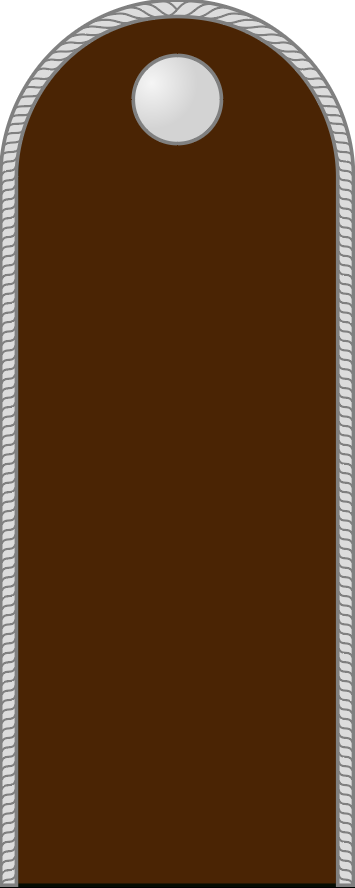
Rank group	Senior NCOs					Junior NCOs		Enlisted
1945-1951
1945-1951			Főtörzsőrmester	Törzsőrmester	Őrmester	Szakaszvezető	Tizedes	Őrvezető	Honvéd
1951-1957
1951-1957			Főtörzsőrmester	Törzsőrmester	Őrmester	Szakaszvezető	Tizedes	Őrvezető	Honvéd
1957-1965
1957-1965			Főtörzsőrmester	Törzsőrmester	Őrmester	Szakaszvezető	Tizedes	Őrvezető	Honvéd
1965-1975
1965-1975			Főtörzsőrmester	Törzsőrmester	Őrmester	Szakaszvezető	Tizedes	Őrvezető	Honvéd
1975-1982
1975-1982	Törzszászlós	Zászlós	Főtörzsőrmester	Törzsőrmester	Őrmester	Szakaszvezető	Tizedes	Őrvezető	Honvéd
1982-1990
1982-1990	Törzszászlós	Zászlós	Főtörzsőrmester	Törzsőrmester	Őrmester	Szakaszvezető	Tizedes	Őrvezető	Honvéd
Rank group	Senior NCOs					Junior NCOs		Enlisted
