= Military history of Hungary =

The military history of Hungary includes battles fought in the Carpathian Basin and the military history of the Hungarian people regardless of geography.

== Early Hungarian warfare ==
The first well established reference to Hungarians derives from Georgius Monachus' work in the 9th century. It mentions that around 837 the Bulgarian Empire desired an alliance with the Hungarians. Although the Hungarians supposedly participated earlier at the Battle of Pliska in 811. The Hungarians began the conquest of the Carpathian Basin in 895. They continued to raid adjacent countries for many years. The Hungarians were able to defeat three major Frankish imperial armies between 907 and 910, however a military defeat in 955 forced them to withdraw and consolidate their gains.

The Magyars advanced as far as the Iberian Peninsula, the Coast of Normandy and city of Constantinople.

The Magyar arts of war involved agility, speed, and precision. Their armies were well-organized and the men were well trained and disciplined. The Hungarians used many tools of war to defeat their foes, the most characteristic of their weapons being the quick-firing reflex bow, which they fired accurately from the saddle, even at full gallop. They also carried sabers and spontoons, but the reflex bow remained their armament of choice. The Magyars placed an emphasis on ranged fighting – their charges were usually preceded by a volley of arrows, and followed up by hand-to-hand combat. The majority of their troops were trained to fight on horseback.

== Era of patrician warfare ==
The Hungarians demonstrated a use of siege weapons, including a battering ram at the Siege of Ausburg. After the death of the last king Demetrius Zvonimir of Croatia, he left no heir, so his wife Helen, the sister of Saint Ladislaus I of Hungary called the Hungarian troops to take control of the kingdom. After Saint Ladislaus' death, his nephew, the King Coloman of Hungary ascended to the Hungarian throne. The feudal lords of Croatia elected a new king, and tried to get rid of the Hungarian occupation, and then the Hungarians took up arms against Croatia, and won a bloody victory at Gvozd Mountain. After this, Coloman was crowned as king of Croatia in 1102. The Hungarian chivalric army was at its best during the reign of Louis I, who also led campaigns against Italy in 1347 and 1350. Nevertheless, there were still light cavalry units in the army, consisting of, among others, Szeklers and the settling Kuns. On the winter of 1458 the 15 years old Mathias Corvinus was elected as king by the Hungarian nobility. During his reign he dealt with the noble factions, and created a centralized royal authority, supported mainly by the first permanent Hungarian mercenary army, the Fekete Sereg (King’s Black Army). Mathias favored the obsolete catapults over the modern cannons already employed by his father. Light cavalry, formed by hussars and Jász mounted archers, regained part of their former role in the Fekete Sereg.
On 2 September 1686 united Hungarian, Austrian and West-European troops liberated Buda from the Turkish occupation. By the end of the 17th century Christian armies led by Habsburgs conquered all the Turkish-ruled territories. Thereafter the Kingdom of Hungary was part of the Habsburg Monarchy.
A decisive part of the fighting force – about four fifth, most of the time – was formed by the main arm of the time: infantry. The other arm, cavalry, still consisted mainly of heavy cavalry, or units equipped with mail armor, called battle cavalry. Another two types of cavalry were dragoons and light cavalry. Hungarian hussars became internationally recognized, being a prime example of light cavalry. In this era artillery became a third arm.
Two significant attempts were made at achieving independence: the war for independence led by Francis II Rákóczi (1703–1711), and the Hungarian Revolution of 1848.

== Notable battles ==
- ~800–970: Hungarian invasions of Europe
  - ~895–902: Hungarian conquest of the Carpathian Basin
  - 899: Battle of Brenta
  - 907: Battle of Pressburg
  - 908: Battle of Eisenach
  - 910: Battle of Lechfeld
  - 910: Battle of Rednitz
  - 919: Battle of Püchen
  - 933: Battle of Merseburg
  - 955: Battle of Lechfeld
  - 970: Battle of Arcadiopolis
- 1044: Battle of Ménfő
- 1051: Battle of Vértes
- 1068: Battle of Kerlés
- 1074: Battle of Mogyoród
- 1091–1097: Croatia in personal union with Hungary
  - 1097: Battle of Gvozd Mountain
- 1146: Battle of the Fischa
- 1167: Battle of Sirmium
- 1202: Siege of Zara
- 1217–1218: King Andrew II's participation in the Fifth Crusade
- 1241–1242: First Mongol invasion of Hungary
  - 1241: Battle of Mohi
- 1246: Battle of the Leitha River
- 1278: Battle on the Marchfeld
- 1282: Battle of Lake Hód
- 1285–1286: Second Mongol invasion of Hungary
- 1312: Battle of Rozgony
- 1348: Battle of Capua
- 1366–1490: Hungarian–Ottoman wars
  - 1396: Battle of Nicopolis
  - 1442: Battle of Hermannstadt
  - 1444: Battle of Kunovica
  - 1444: Battle of Varna
  - 1448: Second Battle of Kosovo
  - 1456: Siege of Belgrade
  - 1464: Siege of Jajce
  - 1479: Battle of Breadfield
  - 1481: Battle of Otranto
- 1477–1488: Hungarian–Austrian War
  - 1485: Siege of Vienna
  - 1486–1487: Siege of Wiener Neustadt
- 1490–1541: Hungarian–Ottoman wars
  - 1521: Siege of Belgrade
  - 1526: Battle of Mohács
  - 1532: Siege of Güns
  - 1541: Siege of Buda
- 1541–1664: Hungarian–Habsburg–Ottoman wars
  - 1543: Siege of Esztergom
  - 1552: Siege of Eger
  - 1566: Siege of Szigetvár
  - 1588: Battle of Szikszó
  - 1595: Battle of Gyurgyevó
  - 1596: Battle of Mezőkeresztes
  - 1599: Battle of Sellenberk
  - 1600: Battle of Miriszló
  - 1652: Battle of Vezekény
  - 1664: Siege of Léva
  - 1664: Battle of Saint Gotthard
- 1683–1699: Great Turkish War
  - 1683: Battle of Vienna
  - 1686: Siege of Buda
  - 1687: Battle of Mohács
  - 1697: Battle of Zenta
- 1703–1711: Rákóczi's War of Independence
  - 1705: Battle of Zsibó
  - 1705: Battle of Saint Gotthard
  - 1708: Battle of Trencsén
- 1716–1718: Habsburg–Ottoman War
  - 1716: Battle of Pétervárad
- 1803–1815: Napoleonic Wars
  - 1809: Battle of Raab
- 1848–1849: Hungarian Revolution of 1848
  - 1848: Battle of Mór
  - 1848: Battle of Pákozd
  - 1848: Battle of Schwechat
  - 1849: Battle of Kápolna
  - 1849: First Battle of Komárom
  - 1849: Second Battle of Komárom
  - 1849: Third Battle of Komárom
  - 1849: Battle of Segesvár
  - 1849: Battle of Szőreg
  - 1849: Battle of Temesvár
- 1914-1918: Hungary in World War I
  - 1914: Battle of Limanowa
  - 1916: Brusilov offensive
  - 1916: Battle of Transylvania
  - 1916: Battle of Doberdò
  - 1917: Battle of Caporetto
- 1918-1920: Revolutions and interventions in Hungary (1918–1920)
  - 1919: Hungarian–Romanian War
- 1941-1945: Hungary in World War II
  - 1941: Invasion of Yugoslavia
  - 1941: Operation Barbarossa
  - 1942-1943: Battle of Stalingrad
  - 1943: Voronezh–Kharkov offensive
  - 1944-1945: Budapest Offensive
- 1956: Hungarian Revolution of 1956

== Sources ==
- Bánlaky, József (1928). A magyar nemzet hadtörténelme [The Military History of the Hungarian Nation] (in Hungarian). Budapest.
- Bohn, H.G. (1854). Hungary and Its Revolutions from the Earliest Period to the Nineteenth Century. London. ASIN B000H48F74.
