= Military ranks of the Kingdom of Hungary =

The Military ranks of the Kingdom of Hungary were the military insignia used by the Kingdom of Hungary. Following the fall of the monarchy, the ranks were replaced with those of the Hungarian People's Army.

== Commissioned officer ranks ==
The rank insignia of commissioned officers.

Rank group	General / flag officers				Senior officers			Junior officers
Royal Hungarian Army
Royal Hungarian Army	Tábornagy	Vezérezredes	Altábornagy	Vezérőrnagy	Ezredes	Alezredes	Őrnagy	Százados	Főhadnagy	Hadnagy	Zászlós
Royal Hungarian River Guard
Royal Hungarian River Guard			Vezérfőkapitány	Vezérkapitány	Főtörzskapitány	Törzskapitány	Törzsalkapitány	Kapitány	Főhajónagy	Hajónagy	Folyami zászlós
Royal Hungarian Air Force
Royal Hungarian Air Force			Altábornagy	Vezérőrnagy	Ezredes	Alezredes	Őrnagy	Százados	Főhadnagy	Hadnagy	Zászlós
Rank group	General / flag officers				Senior officers			Junior officers

== Other ranks ==
The rank insignia of non-commissioned officers and enlisted personnel.

Rank group	Senior NCOs				Junior NCOs		Enlisted
Royal Hungarian Army
Royal Hungarian Army	Alhadnagy	Főtörzsőrmester	Törzsőrmester	Őrmester	Szakaszvezető	Tizedes	Őrvezető	Honvéd
Royal Hungarian River Guard
Royal Hungarian River Guard	Alhajónagy	Főtörzshajómester	Törzshajómester	Hajómester	Szakaszvezető	Tizedes	Őrvezető	Honvéd
Royal Hungarian Air Force
Royal Hungarian Air Force	Alhadnagy	Főtörzsőrmester	Törzsőrmester	Őrmester	Szakaszvezető	Tizedes	Őrvezető	Honvéd
Rank group	Senior NCOs				Junior NCOs		Enlisted
