= Battle of Komárom =

The Battle of Komárom may refer to any of the following battles between Hungarian and Austrian forces:

- First Battle of Komárom (1849), on 26 April
- Second Battle of Komárom (1849), on 2 July
- Third Battle of Komárom (1849), on 11 July
