= Romulusz Ruszin-Szendi =

Hungarian politician and retired lieutenant general

General Romulusz Ruszin-Szendi
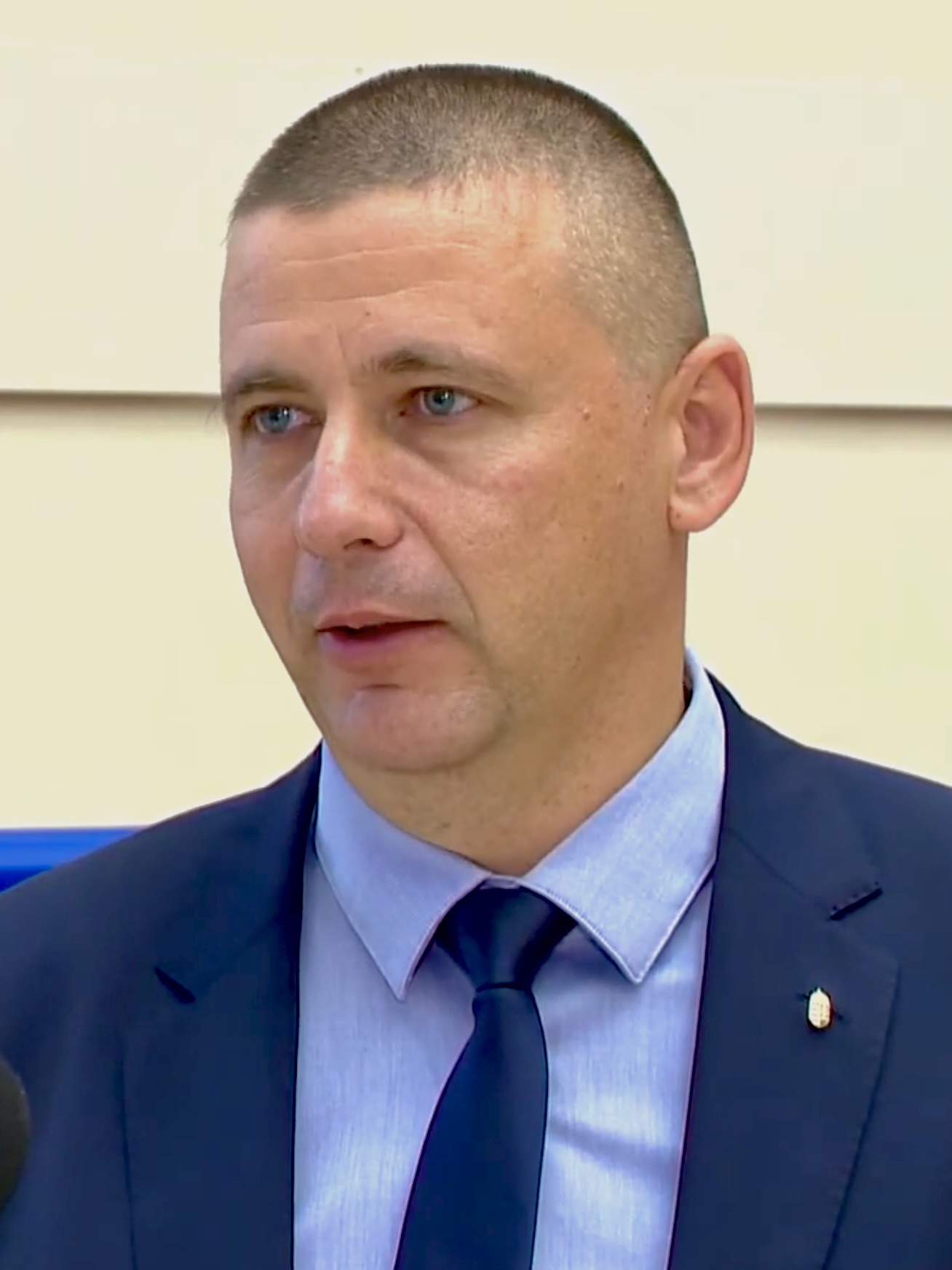
- Ruszin-Szendi in 2020

Minister of Defence
- Incumbent
- Assumed office 13 May 2026
- Prime Minister: Péter Magyar
- Preceded by: Kristóf Szalay-Bobrovniczky

Member of the National Assembly
- Incumbent
- Assumed office 9 May 2026
- Preceded by: Sándor Bodó
- Constituency: Hajdú-Bihar County 5th

11th Chief of General Staff (Note: Known as the Commander of the Hungarian Defence Forces from 2019 to 2022.)
- In office 1 June 2021 – 27 April 2023
- President: János Áder; Katalin Novák
- Preceded by: Ferenc Korom
- Succeeded by: Gábor Böröndi

Personal details
- Born: Romulusz Ruszin; 5 May 1973 (age 53) Miskolc, Hungary
- Party: TISZA
- Children: 2
- Education: Lajos Kossuth Military College; United States Army War College (MA); Miklós Zrínyi National Defense University (PhD)

Military service
- Branch/service: Hungarian Ground Forces
- Years of service: 1995–2023
- Rank: Lieutenant general
- Commands: Hungarian Defence Forces General Staff; Vice Chief of Staff of the Army; HDF 5th Bocskai István Infantry Brigade; HDF 25/88th Light Infantry (Airmobile); HDF 34th Bercsényi László Special Forces Battalion; HDF 25th Klapka György Light Infantry Brigade; Land Forces Component Command; HDF 101st "Szigetvári" Zrínyi Miklós Mixed Artillery Brigade; HDF 101st "Szigetvári" Zrínyi Miklós Mixed Artillery Brigade; HDF 5th "Csobánc" MLRS Artillery Regiment
- Battles/wars: War in Afghanistan; Iraq War
- Awards: Full list

Romulusz Ruszin-Szendi (born 5 May 1973) is Hungarian politician and retired lieutenant general currently serving as Minister of Defence of Hungary since 2026. He previously served as the Chief of General Staff from 1 June 2021 to 27 April 2023, when President Katalin Novák dismissed him from his position. According to the president, Ruszin-Szendi "fulfilled his duties with his best knowledge".

From February 2025, he is the leading military expert of the Tisza Party.

== Early life and career ==
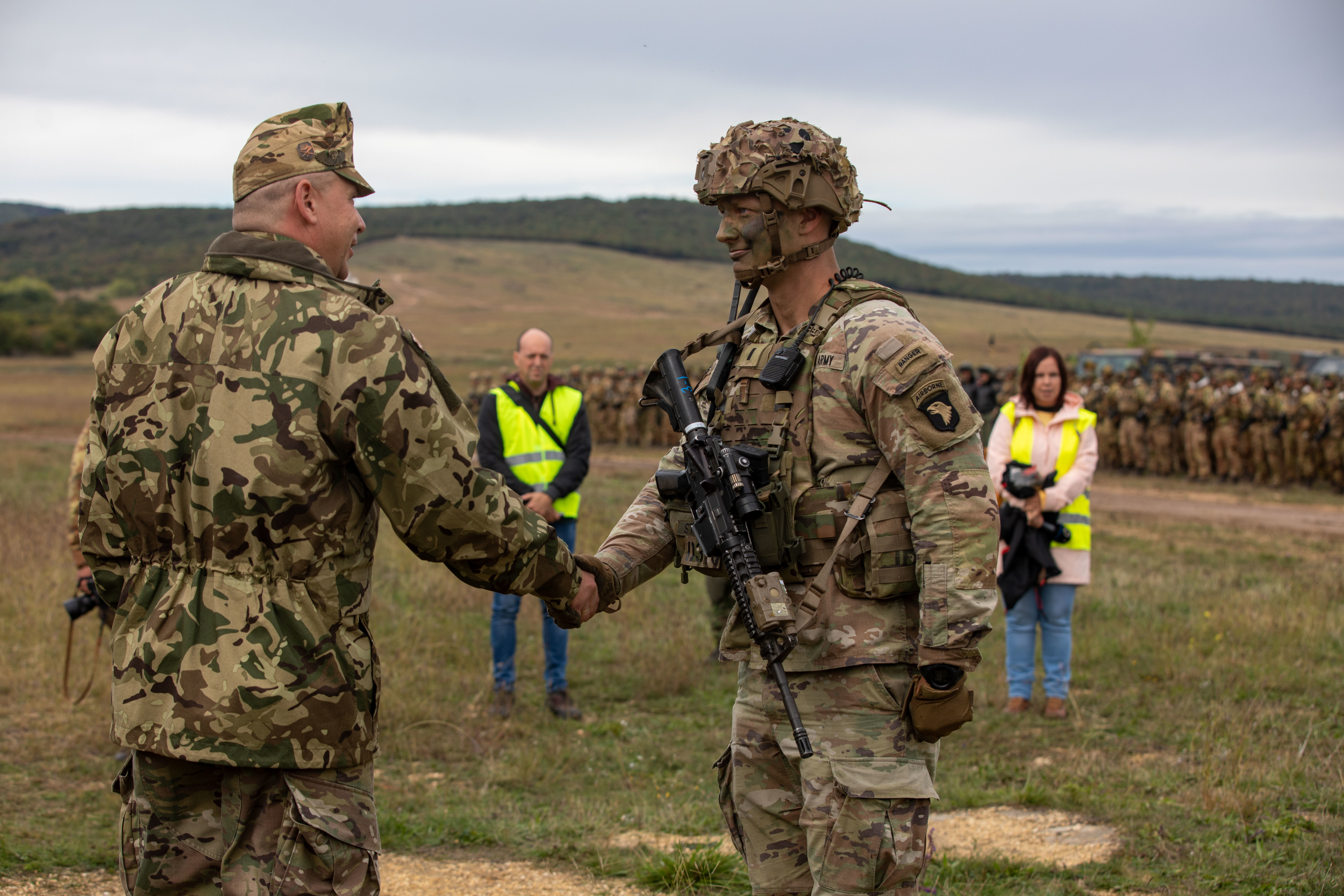
Ruszin-Szendi (left) and David Storch (right)

Ruszin-Szendi went to János Lenkey Cadet College at the István Dobó Middle School in Eger. After finishing middle school, he went to Lajos Kossuth Military College in Szentendre and received his degree and commission as an artillery officer in 1995. As a field officer, he was appointed to the Miklós Zrínyi National Defense University's Military Leader Course. In 2006, Ruszin-Szendi attended the Hungarian Special Forces Qualification Course, and a year later, the Hungarian Special Forces Staff Course. In 2009, he graduated from the Joint Special Operations University (USA), Combating Terrorism Course, and the Special Forces Advance Urban Operation Course in Germany with the 10th Special Forces Group (Airborne). He received his PhD degree at the Miklós Zrínyi National Defense University. In 2011 he attended the Joint Special Operations University (USA), Advance Combating Terrorism Course. In 2014 he received his master's degree of Strategic Studies at the United States Army War College.

== Tisza Party ==
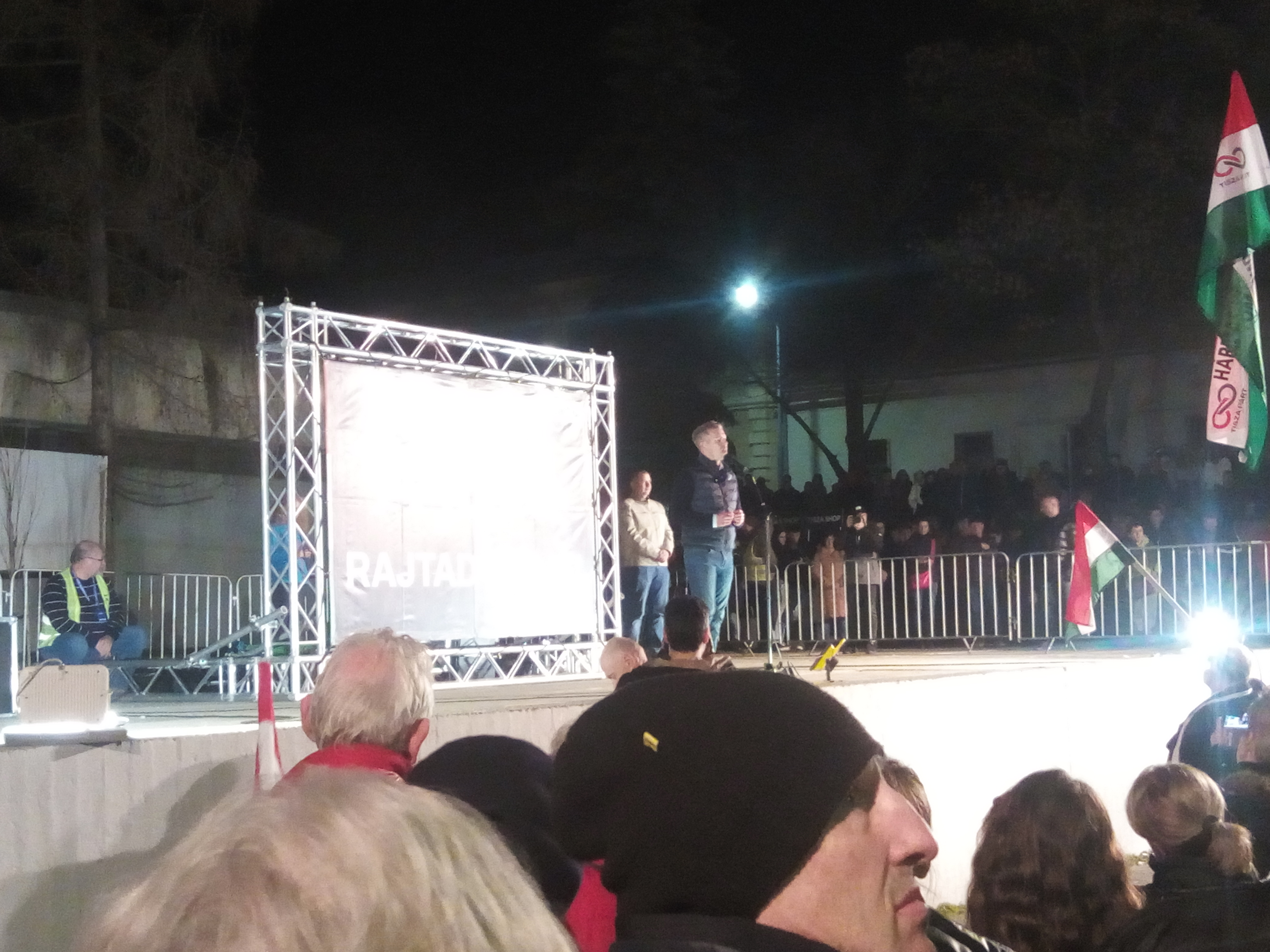
Ruszin-Szendi at Szentes behind Péter Magyar

Ruszin-Szendi first appeared at the Tisza Party's inaugural congress on 15 February 2025, although the press had already revealed days earlier that he would be joining the Tisza Party. To this, Ruszin-Szendi responded: "I can neither confirm nor deny it." In his speech at the congress, he criticized the Orbán government's defense policy.

=== Controversy ===
In September 2025, right-wing media outlet Mandiner published photos of him carrying a firearm concealed in a holster during a public event. After the initial denial and mocking coming from the independent media, which accused Mandiner of spreading fake news, Ruszin-Szendi and Péter Magyar admitted that he indeed had carried a pistol. This, and Ruszin-Szendi's previous statement, according to which "I am trained for that and I could do it" sparked public outrage, because it was the first time in contemporary Hungarian politics that a politician showed up with a gun at a public event. Moreover, carrying firearms in manifestation, protest, rally, gathering is forbidden by the Hungarian law even though Ruszin-Szendi then had a license to own a gun. On the 17 September, the Hungarian Police confiscated Ruszin-Szendi's gun, revoked his license, and started an investigation. Since then, more pictures surfaced, showing him with his pistol. On 27 September, the minister of defence – referring to dishonor as a reason – ended the reserve personnel contract with him and forbade him from using his former military rank.

== International missions ==
- 2007 - 2008 - Military Advisor and Liaison Team (MALT) Commander, Iraq, Baghdad
- 2011 - 2012 - Commander of HUN PRT, Afghanistan

== Career ==
- 1995 - Target acquisition sound battery, platoon commander, HDF 5th "Csobánc" MLRS Artillery Regiment
- 1996 - Staff battery, artillery observer training officer, HDF 5th "Csobánc" MLRS Artillery Regiment
- 1997 - 3rd MLRS battery, first platoon commander (deputy battery commander), HDF 101st "Szigetvári" Zrínyi Miklós Mixed Artillery Brigade
- 1997 - MLRS battalion, training officer, HDF 101st "Szigetvári" Zrínyi Miklós Mixed Artillery Brigade
- 1998 - MLRS battalion, chief of staff, HDF 101st "Szigetvári" Zrínyi Miklós Mixed Artillery Brigade
- 1999 - MLRS battalion, deputy commander, HDF 101st "Szigetvári" Zrínyi Miklós Mixed Artillery Brigade
- 2003 - G-3 operations, senior officer at the doctrinal section, Land Forces Component Command
- 2004 - Chief of plans, HDF 25th Klapka György Light Infantry Brigade
- 2005 - Acting head of G-3, HDF 25th Klapka György Light Infantry Brigade
- 2006 - Chief of staff, HDF 34th Bercsényi László Special Forces Battalion
- 2008 - Commander (acting), HDF 34th Bercsényi László Special Forces Battalion
- 2008 - Deputy Commander, HDF 34th Bercsényi László Special Forces Battalion
- 2009 - Battalion Commander, HDF 25/88th Light Infantry (Airmobile)
- 2014 - General Staff, J-3, Head of Land Forces, Hungarian Defense Forces Department
- 2015 - Acting Chief of J-3, Hungarian Defense Forces, General Staff
- 2016 - Commander, HDF 5th Bocskai István Infantry Brigade, Debrecen
- 2019 - Reserve Command, Hungarian Defense Forces
- 2019 - Head of Office Ministry of Defence, Ministry of Defense,
- 2020 - Undersecretary of the Department of Human Resources Management, Ministry of Defense
- 2021 - Commander of the Hungarian Defence Forces
- 2022 - Chief of General Staff, Hungarian Defence Forces

== Promotions ==
- 1995 - 1st Lieutenant
- 1998 - Captain
- 2003 - Major
- 2007 - Lieutenant Colonel
- 2010 - Colonel
- 2016 - Brigadier General
- 2021 - Major General
- 2021 - Lieutenant General

== Awards and decorations ==

| 1st row | Hungarian Order of Merit Knight's Cross military ribbon | Merit Medal for Service Gold Cross | Merit Medal for Service Silver Cross | Merit Medal for Service Bronze Cross |
| 2nd row | Service Medals for Officers 2nd class | Service Medals for Officers 3rd class | Service Medal for Flood Protection | Service Medal for Flood Protection |
| 3rd row | Service Medal for Flood Protection | Service Medal for Flood Protection | Disaster Relief Service Medal | Migration Crisis Management Service Medal |
| 4th row | Peacekeeping Service Medal (Hungary) for service in Iraq | Peacekeeping Service Medal (Hungary) for service in Afghanistan | Achievement Medal | NATO Medal NTM-IRAQ |
| 5th row | NATO Medal ISAF | | | |

== Notes ==
Political offices
| Preceded by Kristóf Szalay-Bobrovniczky | Minister of Defence; 2026–present | Incumbent |
Military offices
| Preceded by Col. Gen. Ferenc Korom | Chief of the General Staff; 1 June 2021 – 27 April 2023 | Succeeded by Lt. Gen. Gábor Böröndi |
