= Ferenc Korom =

Hungarian military officer

- Born: December 15, 1964 (age 61); Szentes, Hungary
- Military career
- Allegiance: Hungary
- Branch: Hungarian Ground Forces
- Service years: 1987–present
- Rank: Colonel General
- Conflicts: Iraq, Afghanistan, Kosovo, Cyprus
- Awards: Commander's Cross with Star of the Hungarian Order of Merit; Commander of the Legion of Merit; Legion of Merit; Bronze Star Medal

Ferenc Korom (born 15 December 1964) is a Hungarian military officer. He served as the Chief of the Hungarian Defence Forces from 2018 to 1 June 2021, when President János Áder dismissed him from the Chief of the HDF position. According to what the president said, Korom "fulfilled his duties with his best knowledge".

Korom speaks fluently in English.

== Career ==
1987-1990 MH 33. Mechanized Infantry Brigade, Zalaegerszeg

1990-2004 MH 62. Mechanized Infantry Brigade "Miklós Bercsényi", Hódmezővásárhely

2004-2007 MH 25. Infantry Brigade "György Klapka", Tata

2007-2008 MH Joint Forces Command, Székesfehérvár

2008-2011 MH 5. Infantry Brigade "István Bocskai", Debrecen

2011-2017 MH Operational Group Command, Budapest

2018 MH Joint Forces Command, Székesfehérvár

2018-2021 MH Chief of General Staff

== Deployments and Missions ==
September 30, 1997 – September 22, 1998. ENSZ UNFICYP, Company Commander (Cyprus)

September 16, 2003 – September 19, 2004 ENSZ UNFICYP, Contingent Commander (Cyprus)

February 26, 2005 – September 9, 2005 NATO Iraq Training Mission, Trainer Senior Officer (Iraq)

January 8, 2007 – Augustus 1, 2008 MH Guard and Insurer Battalion, Battalion Commander (KFOR, Kosovo)

February 24, 2009 – September 22, 2009 MH Provincial Reconstruction Team (Afghanistan)

February 11, 2013 – Augustus 31, 2013 MH ISAF Chief of Staff (ISAF, Afghanistan)

September 26, 2015 – September 25, 2016 KFOR Deputy Commander (Pristina)

== Awards and decorations ==

1st row	Hungarian Order of Merit Knight's Cross military ribbon	Merit Medal for Service with Laurel Wreath	Merit Medal for Service Gold Cross	Merit Medal for Service Silver Cross
2nd row	Merit Medal for Service Bronze Cross	NATO Accession Commemorative Medal (Hungary)	Service Medals for Officers 2nd class	Service Medals for Officers 3rd class
3rd row	Service Medal for Flood Protection	Migration Crisis Management Service Medal	NATO-EU-OSCE-UN Service Medal	Peacekeeping Service Medal (Hungary) UNFICYP
4th row	Peacekeeping Service Medal (Hungary) KFOR	Peacekeeping Service Medal (Hungary) UNFICYP	Peacekeeping Service Medal (Hungary) NTM-I (Iraq)	Peacekeeping Service Medal (Hungary) KFOR
5th row	Peacekeeping Service Medal (Hungary) ISAF (Afghanistan)	Peacekeeping Service Medal (Hungary) ISAF (Afghanistan)	Peacekeeping Service Medal (Hungary) KFOR	NATO Medal ISAF
6th row	NATO Medal NATO Article 5 medal for Operation Eagle Assist	United Nations Medal UNFICYP	Legion of Merit	Bronze Star Medal
7th row	Italian Joint Forces Medal of Honor from the Defense General Staff	Order of Merit of the Italian Republic Knight's Cross		

Military offices
Preceded by Col. Gen. Tibor Benkő (military officer)	Chief of the General Staff; 1 January 2019 – 31 May 2021	Succeeded by Maj. Gen. Romulusz Ruszin-Szendi

== Personal life ==
Ferenc Korom is married and has one child.

He enjoys reading, fishing, and sport.
