= Zoltán Mihócza =

Hungarian military officer (born 1962)

- Born: March 18, 1962 (age 64); Budapest, Hungary
- Military career
- Allegiance: Hungary
- Service years: 1986-present
- Rank: Lieutenant General
- Commands: Chief of Staff of the General Staff of the Armed Forces of Hungary
- Conflicts: Kosovo, Bosnia-Herzegovina
- Awards: Commander's Cross with Star of the Hungarian Order of Merit; Golden Service Medal; Golden Service Medal with Laurel; Officer's Service Medal Class Three; Officer's Service Medal Class Two; Officer's Service Medal First Class

Zoltán Mihócza (born 18 March 1962) is a Hungarian senior military officer. Mihócza was the Chief of Staff of the General Staff of the Hungarian Defence Forces from 2019 to 2021, when János Áder the President of Hungary promoted Lt.Gen.Ferenc Korom, Brig.Gen. Gábor Böröndi and him to the vacant positions of the former General Staff.

== Early career ==
Mihócza studied Advanced Air Defence in Minsk from 1980 until 1986, when he graduated as a Master of Technical Engineering.

From 1996 until 1997 he studied in the US, on an Advanced Course of Air Defence for Officers.

In 2004 Mihócza entered the Air War College in Montgomery, Alabama, which is a Professional Military Education school. He took lessons there until 2005.

== Later career ==
From 2006 until 2010, Mihócza was promoted to the position of the Deputy Head of Department in the HM-HVK Operational and Trainer General Department. He was the head of the Force Planning Command until 2011. Then Mihócza was sent to Brussels as a military delegate by the MH Military Delegate Office. For three years, until 2016 Mihócza was the Deputy Chief of Staff of the Joint Forces Command. For one year, he served Sarajevo, Bosnia, in the EUFOR. After Mihócza's second deployment in Sarajevo, he was appointed to the position of the Chief of Staff (then Acting Commander) of the Joint Forces Command until 2019, after which he served until 2022 in Budapest, as Chief of Staff of the Hungarian Defence Forces Command.

Mihócza is a military interpreter, he speaks both English and Russian fluently.

== Personal life ==
Mihócza is married and he has one child.
