= Hungarian Army (disambiguation) =

Hungarian Army may refer to:

- The armies of the Kingdom of Hungary (1000–1526)
- Hungarians in Austrian service participating the Hungarian Revolution of 1848
- Royal Hungarian Honvéd (1867-1918)
- Royal Hungarian Army (1920-1945)
- Hungarian Ground Forces (1946-present)
  - As a pars pro toto, the Hungarian Defence Force and its predecessors
