= Tibor Benkő (general officer) =

Hungarian military officer

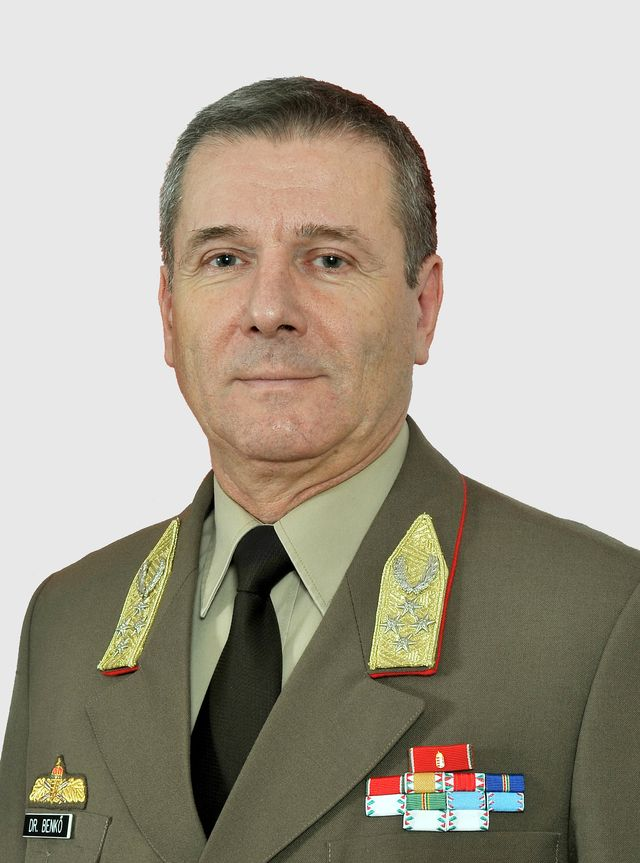

Minister of Defence of Hungary
- In office 2018–2022
- Preceded by: István Simicskó
- Succeeded by: Kristóf Szalay-Bobrovniczky

Personal details
- Born: 16 October 1955 (age 71) Nyíregyháza, Hungary
- Awards: Commander's Cross with Star of the Hungarian Order of Merit; Commander of the Legion of Merit

Military service
- Allegiance: Hungary
- Years of service: 1975–2018
- Rank: Colonel General
- Commands: General Staff of the Armed Forces of Hungary
- Battles/wars: Iraq War, War in Afghanistan

Tibor Benkő (born 16 October 1955) is a Hungarian military officer and government official. He served as the Minister of Defence from 2018 to 2022. He previously was a four-star general in the Hungarian Defence Forces, serving as Chief of the Defence Staff from 6 June 2010 until 16 May 2018.

== Early military career ==
In 1975, he enrolled in Kossuth Lajos Military College as a rocket and field artillery major. He graduated in 1979. From 1979–1981, he served in the 36th Anti-Tank Artillery Regiment (based in Kiskunhalas) of the Hungarian People's Army as a platoon commander, then from 1981–1985 as the Regimental Operations Officer. From 1985–1988, he studied at the Soviet Army's Kalinin Artillery Academy in Leningrad (now the Mikhailovskaya Military Artillery Academy). Upon his return from the Soviet Union, he was given a staff role in the 5th Army Artillery Corps. In 1990, he became deputy brigade commander of the 36th Anti-Tank Artillery Brigade, becoming brigade commander in 1993. In 1995, he became commander of the newly reformed regiment. From 2000-2001, he studied at the United States Army War College. In 2001, he commanded the MH 5th Rifle Brigade István Bocskai.

== Command positions ==
After having studied human resources management at Szent István University from 2004–2006, he was transferred to Hungarian Army Land Command in 2005, serving as First Deputy Commander. He became acting commander a year later. From 2007–2009, he was Deputy Commander at Hungarian Armed Forces Joint Command and from 2009–2010. During this period, he studied at the Zrínyi Miklós National Defense University Kossuth Lajos Faculty of Military Science, where he defended his doctoral dissertation on Reconversion as a Strategic Issue in the Management of Human Resources of Professional Armed Forces on September 2, 2010. From 6 June 2010 until 16 May 2018, he was Chief of the Defence Staff.

== In government ==
Following the 2018 parliamentary election, General Benkő was nominated by Prime Minister Viktor Orbán to serve as Minister of Defence, it was alleged that he would be both a soldier and a minister.

== Personal life ==
General Benkő is married and has two daughters. He speaks English and Russian in addition to Hungarian.

== Awards and decorations ==

1st row	Hungarian Order of Merit Commander's Cross with Star on military ribbon	Hungarian Order of Merit Officer's Cross on military ribbon	Hungarian Order of Merit Knight's Cross military ribbon	Merit Medal for Service with Laurel Wreath
2nd row	Merit Medal for Service Gold Cross	Medal for Service to the Country (HPR) Silver Medal	Service Medals for Officers 1st class	Medal for Service to the Country (HPR) Bronze Medal
3rd row	Meritorious Service Medal HPR (1964) for 10 years service	Service Medal for Flood Protection	Service Medal for Flood Protection	Service Medals for Officers 2nd class
4th row	Service Medals for Officers 3rd class	Commander of the Legion of Merit (2012)	Legion of Honour Officier	

Military offices
Preceded by Col. Gen. László Tömböl	Chief of the General Staff; 6 June 2010 – 16 May 2018	Succeeded by Lt. Gen. Ferenc Korom
Political offices
Preceded by István Simicskó	Minister of Defence; 2018–2022	Succeeded by Kristóf Szalay-Bobrovniczky
