= 11th Armoured Brigade =

11th Armoured Brigade may refer to:

- 11th Armored Brigade (People's Republic of China)
- 11th Armored Hajduk Brigade "István Bocskai", Hungary
- 11th Armoured Brigade (United Kingdom)

== See also ==
- 11th Brigade (disambiguation)
