= Kristóf Szalay-Bobrovniczky =

Hungarian diplomat and politician

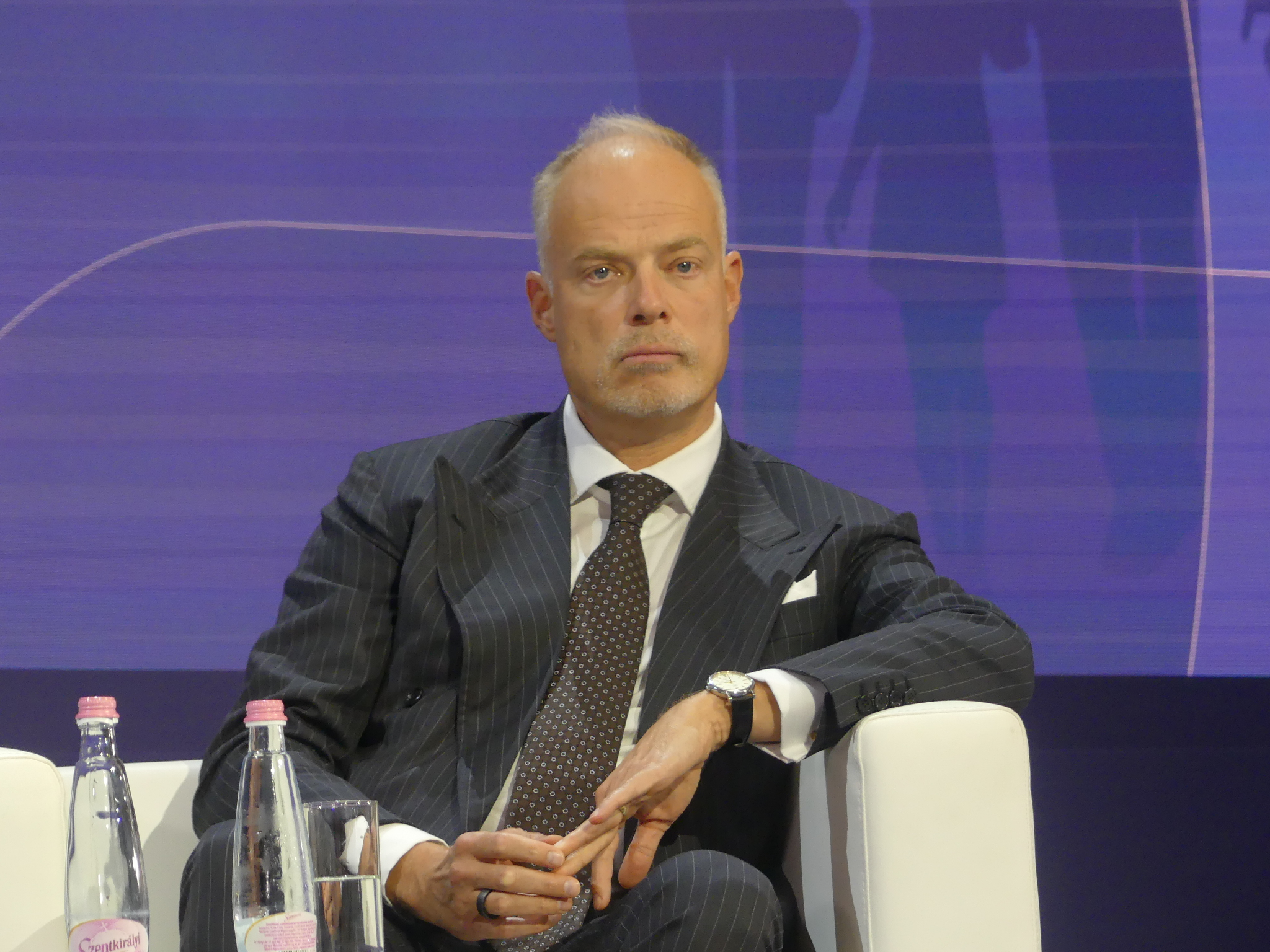
- Szalay-Bobrovniczky in 2023

Minister of Defence
- In office 24 May 2022 – 12 May 2026
- Prime Minister: Viktor Orbán
- Preceded by: Tibor Benkő
- Succeeded by: Romulusz Ruszin-Szendi

Hungarian ambassador to the United Kingdom
- In office 2016–2020
- Preceded by: Péter Szabadhegy

Personal details
- Born: 6 June 1970 (age 56) Budapest, Hungarian People's Republic
- Education: Programme Copernic; University of Gödöllő

Kristóf Szalay-Bobrovniczky (né Szalay; born 6 June 1970) is a Hungarian diplomat and politician who was the ambassador of Hungary to the United Kingdom from 2016 to 2020. He handed over his credentials to Elizabeth II on 15 November 2016 in Buckingham Palace. His wife is Alexandra Szentkirályi (Szalay-Bobrovniczky), government spokesperson. From 2022 to 2026, he was the minister of defence of Hungary.

== Biography ==
Kristóf Szalay-Bobrovniczky was born on 6 June 1970 in Budapest, Hungary.

His first known ancestor appears in a patent of 1286, one other was the representative to the national assembly in 1447. Most members of his family were military officers, county officials and land owners. All family property was confiscated under communist rule of Hungary.

He has one younger brother, Vince Szalay-Bobrovniczky, a career diplomat who currently serves in the Prime Minister's Office as Deputy State Secretary and used to be Hungary's ambassador to Finland and Estonia and earlier to Austria.

Szalay-Bobrovniczky graduated in 1993 from the University of Gödöllő, Hungary and completed Programme Copernic (post graduate management course of SciencePo and Collège des Ingénieurs) in Paris, France.

== Career ==
He worked in the financial sector for six years initially with Deloitte and then with Crédit Lyonnais Bank in Hungary. In 1999 he joined the telecom sector where he held different sales and marketing executive positions with Pantel Zrt. (owned by Dutch telco KPN) and Deutsche Telekom's online branch and became managing director of a Nasdaq listed internet service provider. During his business career he also was on the board of private equity funds. He is a member of the board of the largest state owned property development project of Budapest, the International Property Award winner Városliget Zrt. worth of Euro 0.5 bn.

He became involved with public affairs in 2004 as a publisher and chief editor of a leading Hungarian political weekly magazine. From 2011 until 2016 he was the executive vice president of Századvég Foundation, the largest and oldest Hungarian think tank. He co-owns Századvég Economy Research Institute, a strategic consultancy.

== Other activities ==
Szalay-Bobrovniczky is a captain in the reserves of the Hungarian Army and served on active duty with the Hungarian Palace Guards. He was the chairman of the Hungarian Reservist Association, and is now the honorary chairman of it. He was awarded for these services the Distinguished Award of Defence by the Hungarian Minister of Defence in 2016.

Szalay-Bobrovniczky competed in show jumping for several years. His interest in equestrian sports came from his great uncle Bert de Némethy, the famous show jumping coach of the US and the builder of the 1984 Los Angeles Olympic show jumping course.

Kristóf Szalay-Bobrovniczky is the chairman of the De Némethy Foundation.

Szalay-Bobrovniczky was also competing in martial arts, he was awarded 2nd dan in kendo.

Szalay-Bobrovniczky speaks Hungarian, English, French and German.

Political offices
Preceded by Tibor Benkő	Minister of Defence; 2022–2026	Succeeded by Romulusz Ruszin-Szendi
