= Nurol Ejder =

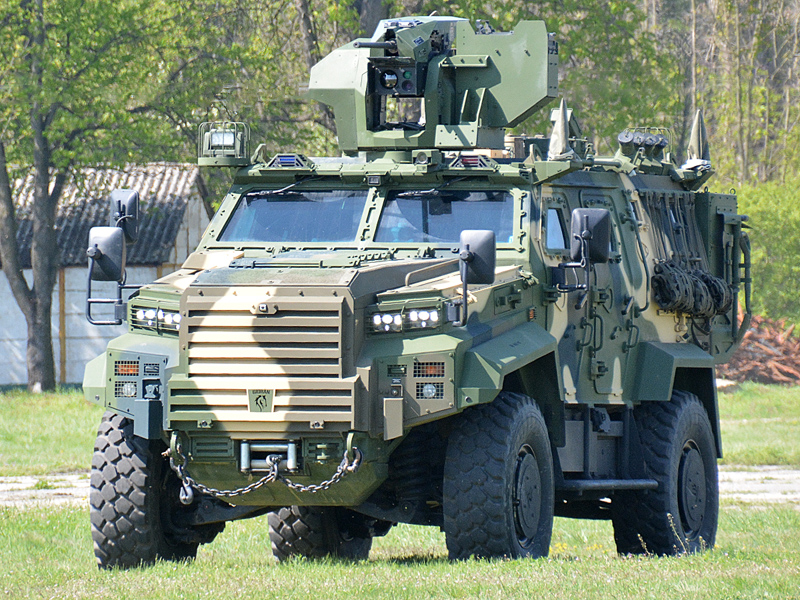
- Nurol Ejder (4x4).
- Type: IMV, MRAP
- Place of origin: Turkey

Service history
- Used by: See Operators
- Wars: Kurdish–Turkish conflict

Production history
- Manufacturer: Nurol Makina
- Produced: Ejder 6x6: 2008 Ejder Yalçın 4x4: 2014
- Variants: Armored personnel carrier, infantry fighting vehicle

Specifications
- Mass: Ejder 6×6: 18 tons, Ejder Yalçın 4×4: 14 tons
- Length: Ejder 6×6: 7.05 m, Ejder Yalçın 4×4: 5.4 m
- Width: Ejder 6×6: 2.69 m, Ejder Yalçın 4×4: 2.5 m
- Height: Ejder 6×6: 2.4 m, Ejder Yalçın 4×4: 2.3 m
- Crew: Ejder 6×6: 2+10, Ejder Yalçın 4×4: 2+9
- Armor: All welded steel armour up to STANAG-4569 level 4
- Main armament: 7.62mm / 12.7 mm machine gun
- Secondary armament: 25mm autocannon 40mm automatic grenade launcher
- Engine: Ejder 6×6: Cummins 6-cylinder turbocharged diesel, Ejder Yalçın 4×4: Cummins diesel engine Ejder 6×6: 402 hp, Ejder Yalçın 4×4: 375 hp
- Power/weight: Ejder 6×6: 22.33 hp/tonne
- Operational range: 700 km for both versions
- Maximum speed: 120 km/h for both versions

The Nurol Ejder (Turkish pronunciation: [nuɾˈoɫ ˈeʒˈdɛɾ]; lit. "Dragon") is a family of armoured vehicles produced by Turkish company Nurol Makina. Two versions exists under the Ejder name; being a 6x6 version and a more popular 4x4 version, referred to as Ejder Yalcin.

== Variants ==
=== Ejder 6×6 Armoured Combat Vehicle ===
Baseline 6×6 version is fitted with a remotely controlled 7.62 mm caliber machine gun and 40mm automatic grenade launcher. Supports integration of various weapon systems and armed turrets weighted up to 5 tons. V-shaped hull for improved protection against landmines and IEDs. It can withstand the blast from an 8 kg mine. Protection can be enhanced with modular add-on armor.

A number of these vehicles were sold to Georgia in 2008.

=== Ejder Yalçın 4×4 Armoured Combat Vehicle ===
Design studies on the vehicle were initiated in the last quarter of 2012 and a pre-prototype of the base vehicle was exhibited at the IDEF in 2013. Mass production of the vehicle began in May 2014.

It features a V-shaped hull design, integrating floating floor plates and blast mitigation seating to provide protection against mines and IED's. It can accommodate up to 11 personnel and can carry a payload of up to 4 tons.

The vehicle is equipped with optionally integrated, remote-controlled and manually operated weapon stations. It is fitted with two gun ports on the roof. The optional armament mounted on the vehicle includes 7.62mm and 12.7mm machine guns, a 25mm anti-aircraft gun and a 40mm automatic grenade launcher.

== Versions ==
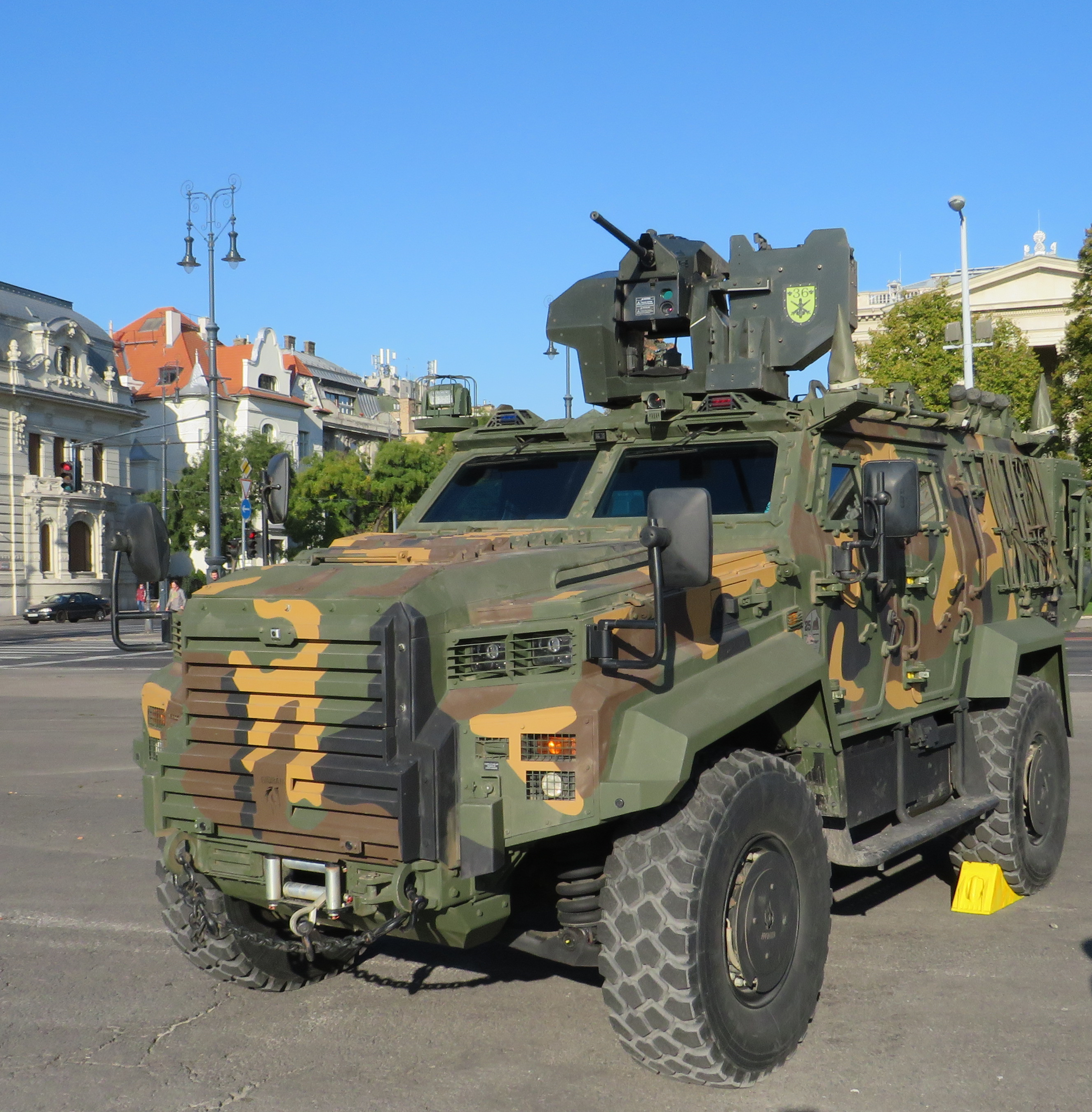
Gidran 4x4 of Hungary based on Ejder Yalcin.

Both vehicles can be configured to be used in a variety of roles including:

- Personnel carrier
- Reconnaissance
- Nuclear, biological and chemical warfare
- Fire support
- ATGM carrier
- IFV
- Mortar
- Command
- Recovery
- Medical evacuation
- Engineering

== Operators ==
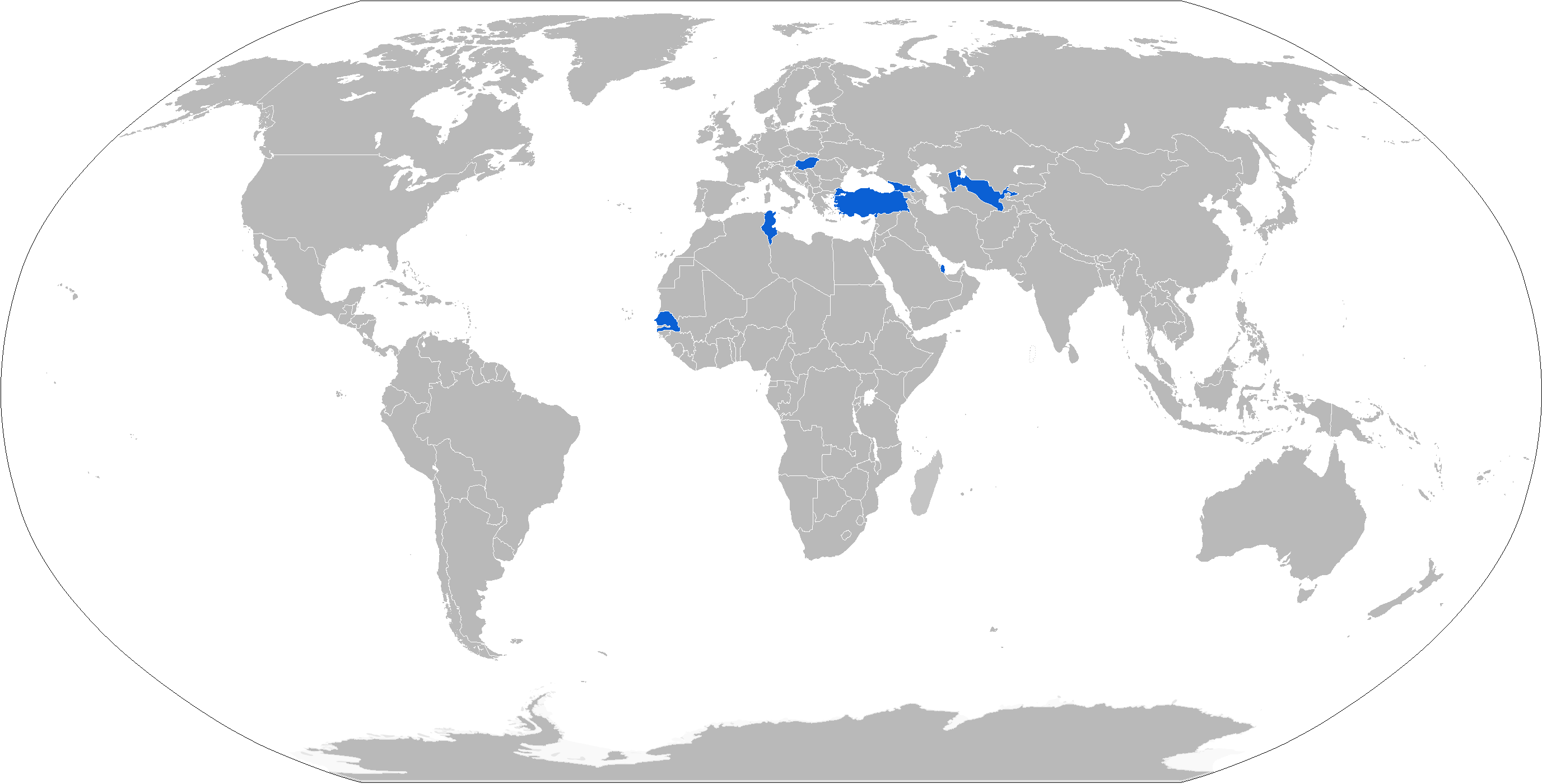
Map with Ejder operators in blue

=== Ejder 6×6 current operators ===
- Burkina Faso
- Syria: Received Nurol Ejder 6x6s from Turkey and Georgia in July 2025.
- Tunisia

=== Ejder Yalçın 4×4 current operators ===
- Burkina Faso
  - Army of Burkina Faso: in use since at least early 2022, first seen during January 2022 Burkina Faso coup d'état.
- Chad
  - Chadian Ground Forces: at least 20 in service, some were operated by the Chadian peacekeeping contingent of United Nations Multidimensional Integrated Stabilization Mission in Mali.
- Hungary
  - Hungarian Ground Forces: 10 in service, 40 more on order, plus up to 300 additional vehicles to be produced locally in Hungary under licence from Nurol Makina, with Hungarian variant receiving the name Gidran.
- Malaysia
  - Malaysian Army United Nations Interim Force in Lebanon contingent: 20 in service. Known as Panthera in Malaysian Army service.
- Morocco
  - Royal Moroccan Army: 30 Ejder Yalçıns in service.
- Niger:
  - Niger Army: unspecified quantity ordered in 2022.
- Qatar
  - Qatari Emiri Land Force: 342 on order.
- Senegal
  - National Gendarmerie: 25 units purchased in February 2018.
- Tanzania
  - Tanzanian Army: first seen in use in late 2025.
- Tunisia
  - Tunisian Army: 71 in service.
- Turkey
  - Turkish Land Forces: 360+.
  - Gendarmerie General Command: 200.
  - General Directorate of Security: 417.
- Uzbekistan
  - Border Troops of the State Security Service: 24 in service, 1000 more on order.
