= Nurol Makina ve Sanayi A.S. =

- Type: Subsidiary
- Industry: Defence
- Founded: 1976
- Headquarters: Sincan, Ankara, Turkey
- Area served: Worldwide
- Products: Armored combat vehicles Weapon systems
- Services: Upgrade & Modernisation; Integrated logistics support services
- Website: Official website

Nurol Makina ve Sanayi A.S. is a Turkish defense manufacturer founded in 1976. As of August 2026 the company is fully owned by Nurol Holding of Türkiye and operates facilities located in Sincan, Ankara. The company specializes in the design and production of 4×4 tactical armored vehicles. Its products are mostly used by Turkish Armed Forces and General Directorate of Security of Turkey and exported to over 20 countries.

== History ==
Nurol Makina was founded in 1976. In the beginning it was mostly operating in the general machinery and industrial sectors. The company shifted its focus to armored land vehicles in 1992. By the late 2000s company expanded its international operations by Nurol Ejder Yalçın 4×4.

In the 2020s, Nurol Makina expanded its operations in the European market. The company signed a contract with Estonia for the delivery of 100 NMS 4x4 vehicles. Deliveries of these vehicles were completed in March 2025 making Estonia Nurol Makina's second NATO and EU member user after Hungary.

== International Operations ==
Nurol Makina manages its international activities mostly through its subsidiaries in Hungary and the United Kingdom.

=== Hungary ===
Nurol Makina Hungary Kft. is a defence subsidiary of Nurol Makina. Its operations are mainly sales, engineering, production and sales support. Local production of Gidrán with Rába and delivery to the Hungarian Defence Forces is planned.

=== United Kingdom ===
NMS UK is a defence subsidiary of Nurol Makina based in Leamington Spa. The company signed an agreement to form a joint venture with NP Aerospace at the 2023 IDEF exhibition. The company is planning to start the production in UK in 2026.

== Products ==
- Nurol Ejder
  - Nurol Ejder Yalçın 4×4
  - Nurol Ejder Yalçın EWB 4×4
  - Nurol Ejder Kunter 4×4
  - Nurol Ejder Toma 4×4
- Nurol NMS
  - Nurol NMS 4×4
  - Nurol NMS EWB 4×4
- Nurol NMS-L 4×4
- Nurol PARS 4×4
- Nurol Ilgaz 4×4
