= General Directorate of Security (Turkey) =

Turkish national police force

Coordinates: 39°53′59″N 32°50′39″E

General Directorate of Security Emniyet Genel Müdürlüğü
- Badge of the Turkish General Directorate of Security
- Common name: Polis

Agency overview
- Formed: 10 April 1845
- Employees: 335,360 personnel

Jurisdictional structure
- National agency: Turkey
- Operations jurisdiction: Turkey
- Constituting instrument: Law on Duties and Powers of the Police
- General nature: Civilian police

Operational structure
- Headquarters: Ankara, Turkey
- Elected officer responsible: Mustafa Çiftçi, Interior Minister
- Agency executive: Mahmut Demirtaş, General Director
- Parent agency: Ministry of the Interior

Website
- www.egm.gov.tr

The General Directorate of Security (Turkish: Emniyet Genel Müdürlüğü, EGM), or the Turkish National Police, is the national civil police of Turkey primarily responsible for law enforcement in urban areas, whilst rural policing falls under the jurisdiction of the Gendarmerie General Command.

== History ==
Its creation dates back to the 19th century. Until the dissolution of the Janissaries in 1826, police services in the Ottoman Empire were carried out by local garrisons and public administrators.

The present-day TNP was then established in 1845, as part of the Tanzimat, with a law inspired by the Paris Police.

Though it faced massive changes in function and structure over the years, the institution itself remained the same and was not replaced by a successor during the Turkish Revolution.

== Function and mission ==
The Police Duties and Jurisdiction Law of 1934 (Turkish: Polis Vazife ve Salâhiyet Kanunu) establishes the fundamental mission of the TNP as to:

- Protect the public order, persons and the immunity of residence,
- Ensure the safety of the people, goods, and the public peace,
- Provide assistance to the children in need of help, disabled persons, and other disadvantaged groups.

== Structure ==
The TNP reports to the Ministry of the Interior and is composed of 81 divisions, each for respective provinces, that make up several police regions that are bolstered by specialist units.

In the provinces, it operates under the command of governors (Turkish: vali) and district governors (Turkish: kaymakam). Civil administrators (Turkish: mülki amir) are responsible for the security and well-being of towns and districts.

The Turkish National Police (TNP) operates within the network of the civil administration system and carries out its duties under the command and control of the civil authority. Town governors and heads of district administrations supervise the force.

As of 2024, the centralized structure as it follows:

- Inspection Board
- Private Security Inspection Board
- Executive Assistant Directorate
- Legal Affairs Directorate
- Personnel Directorate
- Special Operations Directorate
- Intelligence Directorate
- Traffic Directorate
- Presidential Protection Directorate
- Combating Smuggling and Organized Crimes Directorate
- Combating Narcotics Crimes Directorate
- Internal Audit Unit
- Police Academy

As of 2023, the TNP has 352,188 personnel in law enforcement and public service positions, making it one of the largest public employers in Turkey. It was allocated an $8.6 billion budget in 2024.

However, the government surged the "internal security" grants in the 2025 budget proposal, increasing the grand total for all law enforcement agencies to an all-time record of $19.5 billion.

== Units ==
All Turkish police officers wear navy-blue uniforms and caps.

Patrol cars can be identified by their unique blue-white design and the writing Polis (Turkish for "Police") on the side doors and hood.

Commissioners and police chiefs wear silver stars rank on their shoulders and police directors wear gold stars.

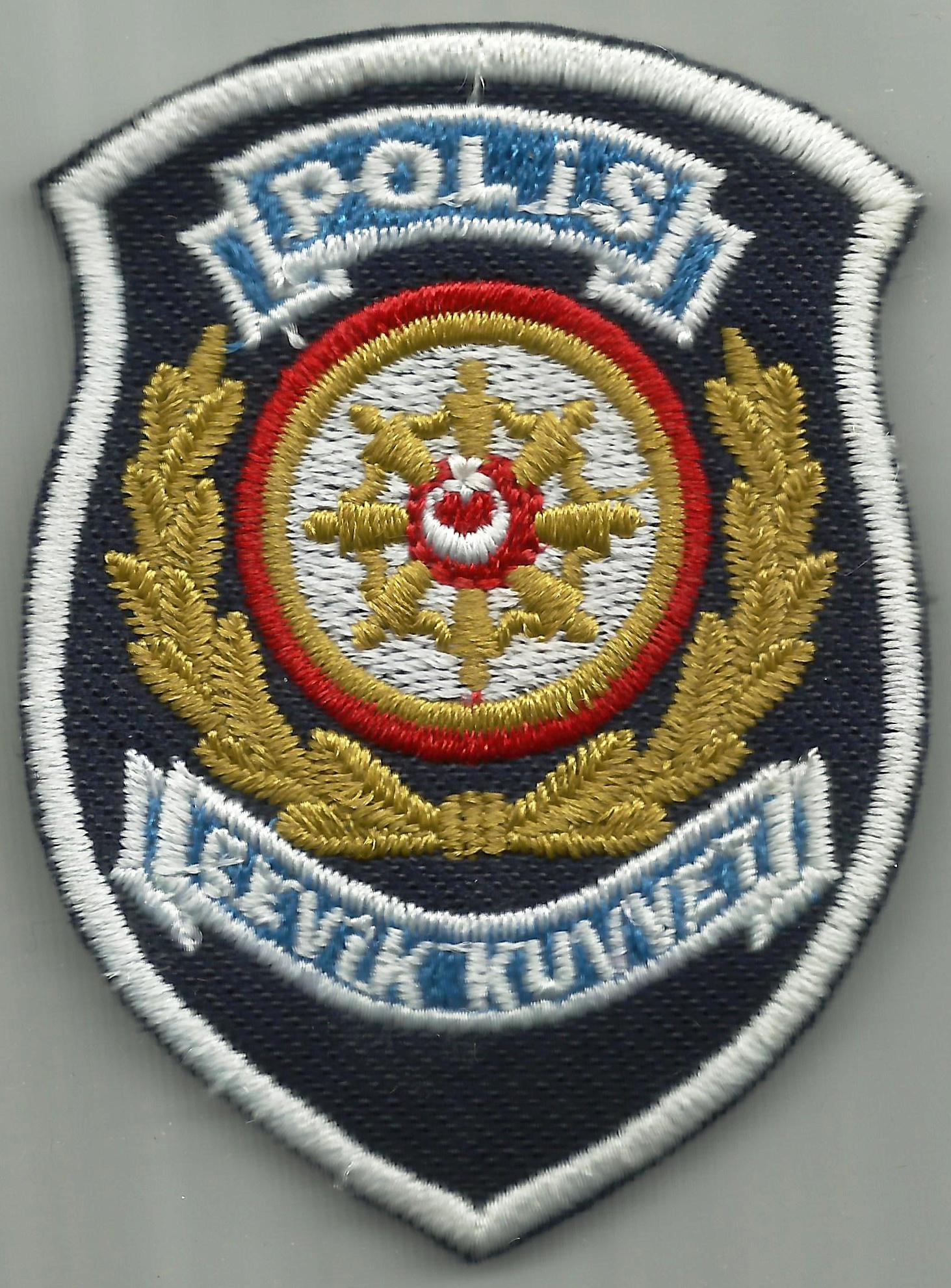
Çevik Kuvvet (riot squad) armpatch

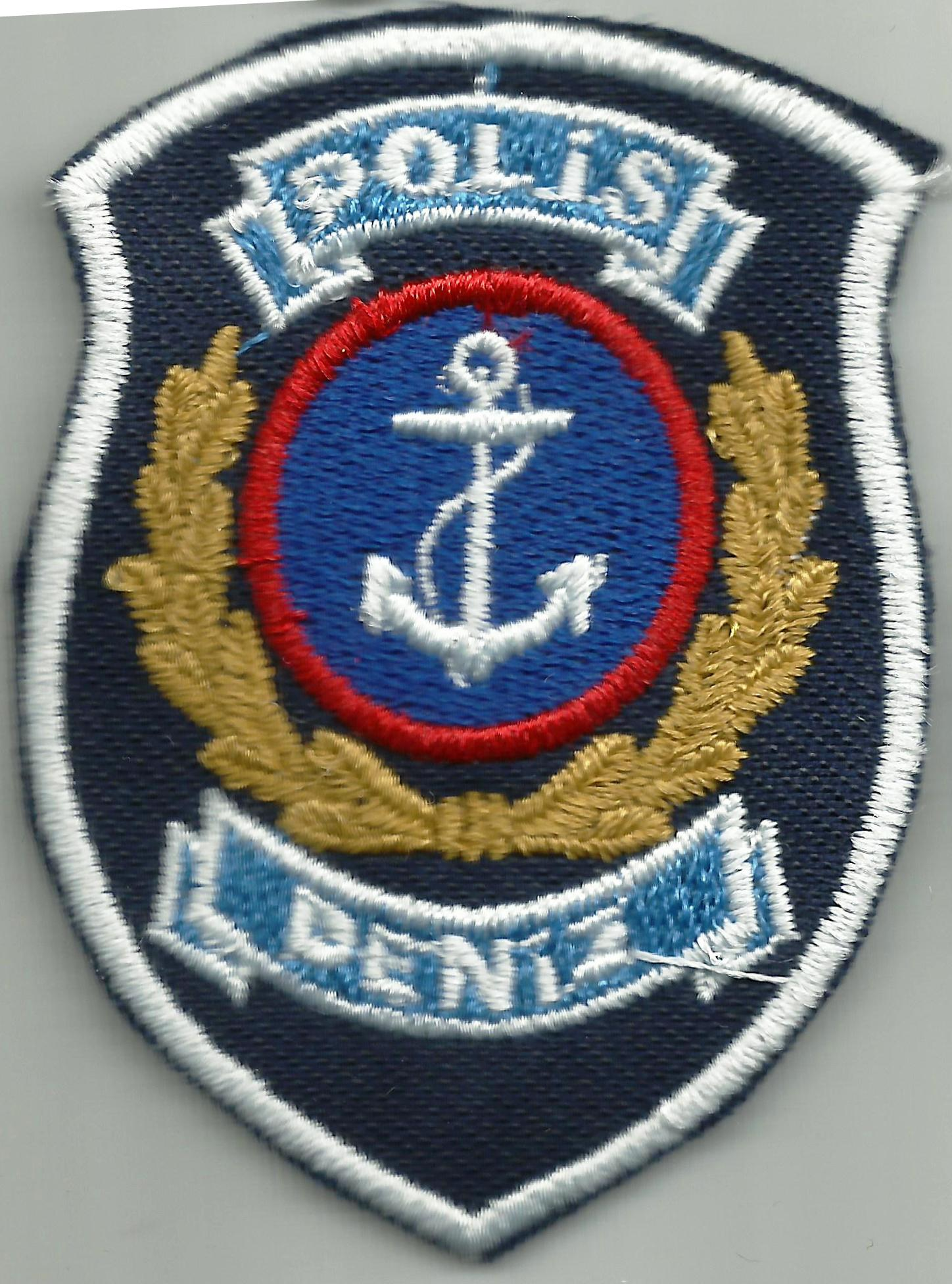
Naval armpatch

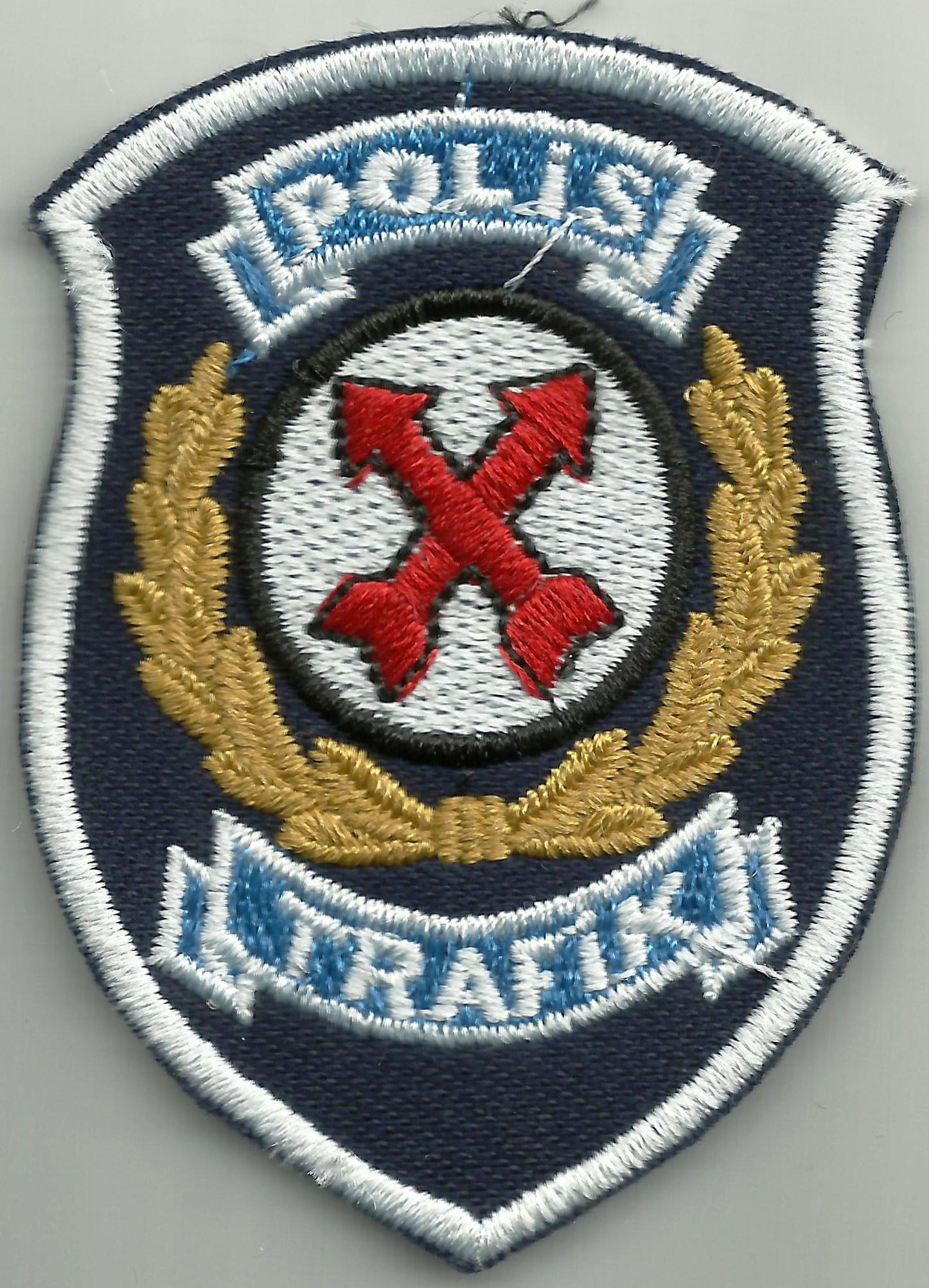
Traffic armpatch

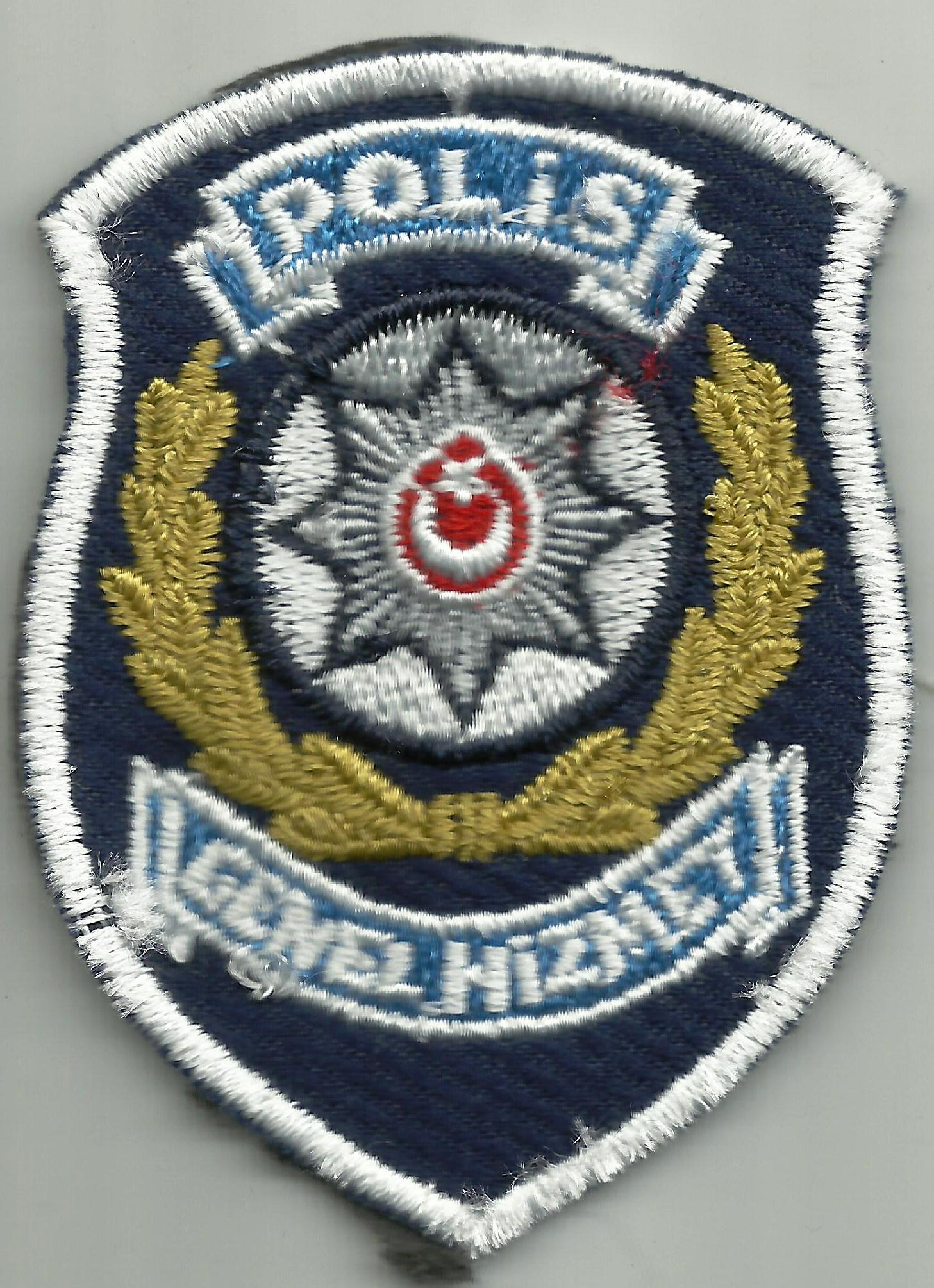
General Service armpatch

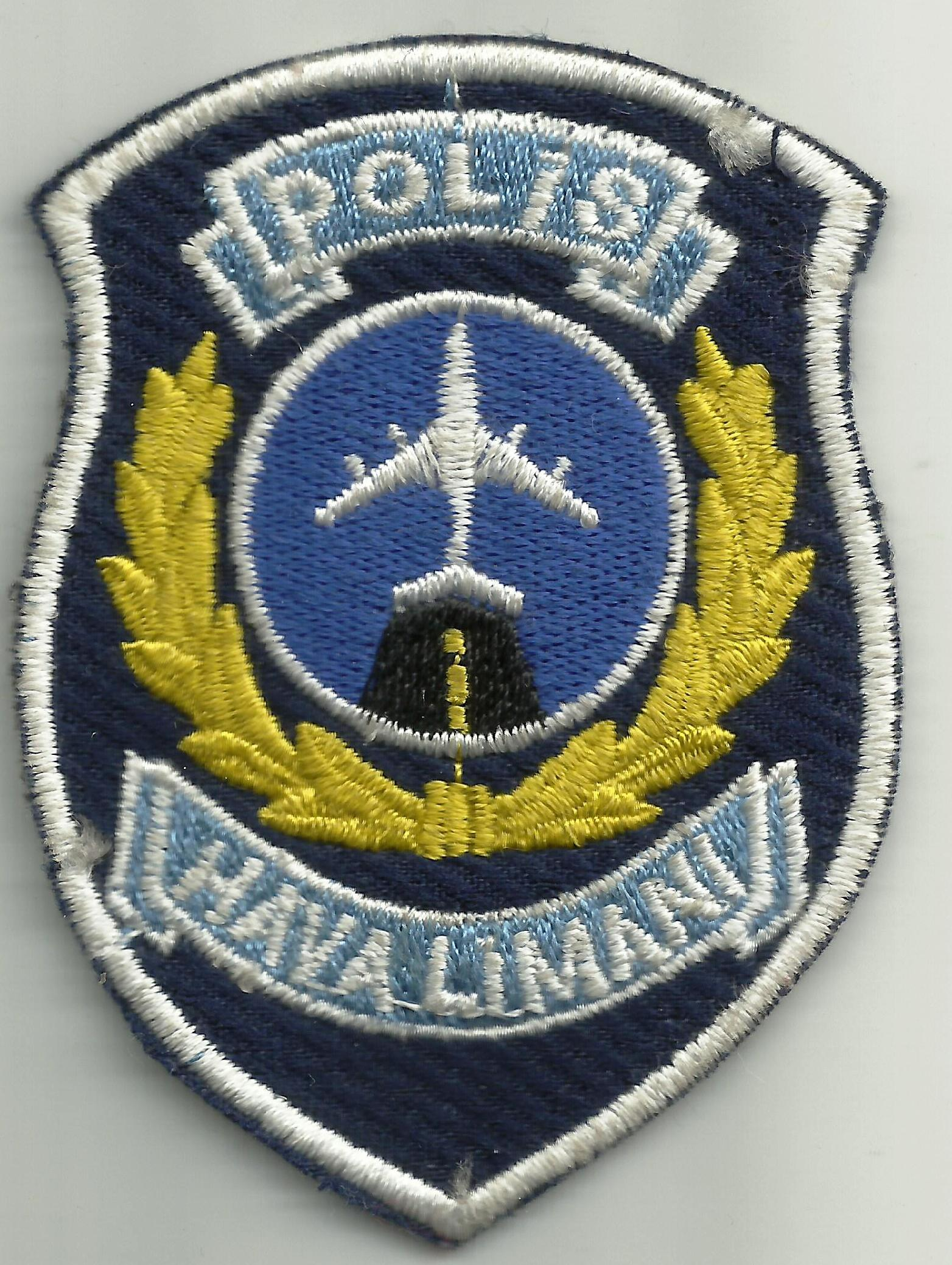
Airport armpatch

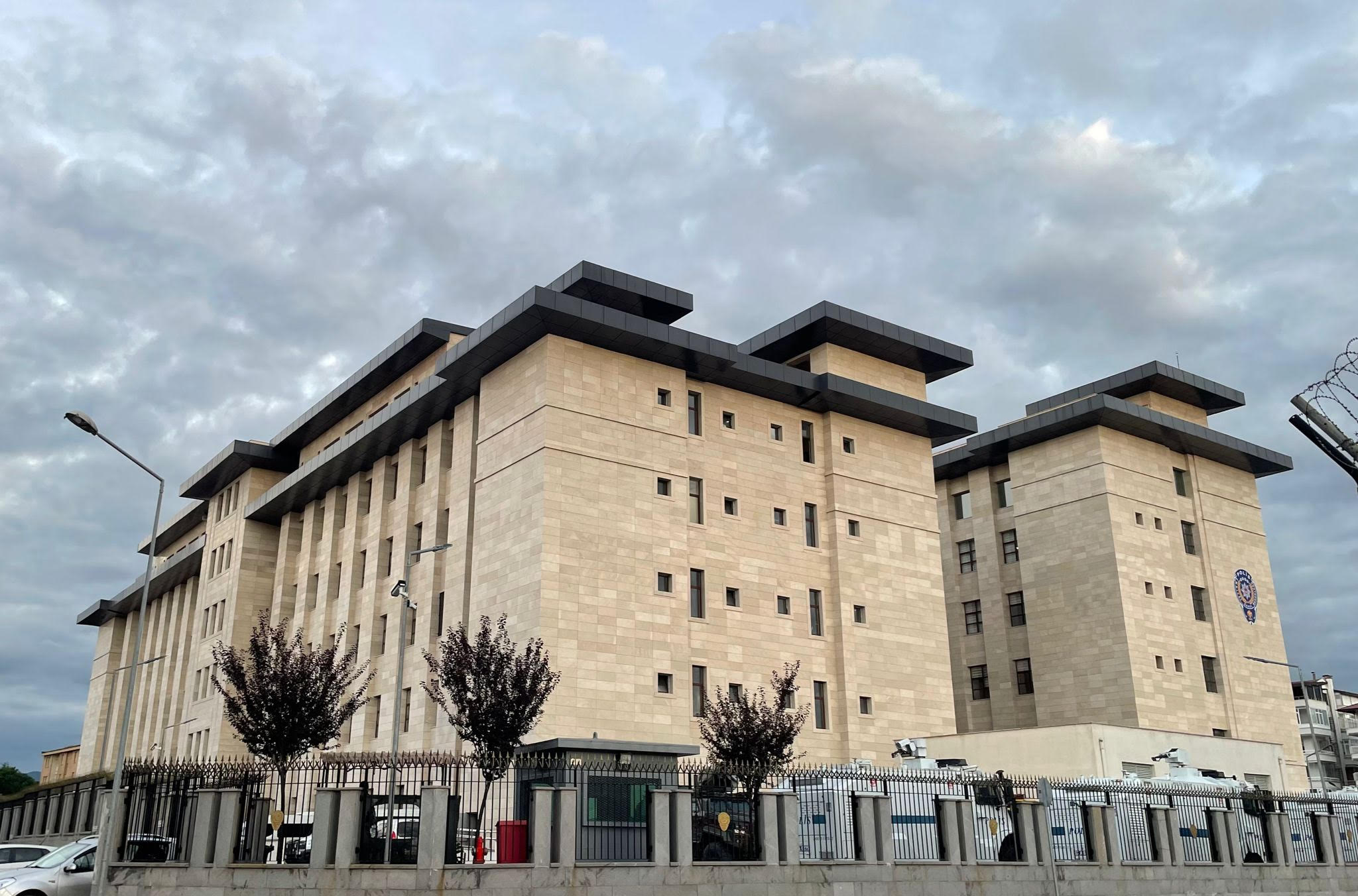
Provincial Police Headquarters in Ordu

Some well-known police units in Turkey are:

- Martılar (English: Gulls) bike patrol units
- Yunuslar (English: Dolphins) motorcycle units
- Şahinler (English: Falcons) motorcycle units of the traffic department
- TOMA armored water cannon designed for riot control
- Çevik Kuvvet (English: Agile Force) who handle riot control cases
- Özel Harekat (English: Special Operations) which is the special response unit of the directorate (quite like the American SWAT or the German GSG 9)
- Karşı Atak Timi (English: Counter Attack Team) close protection service for the president
- Aviation Department
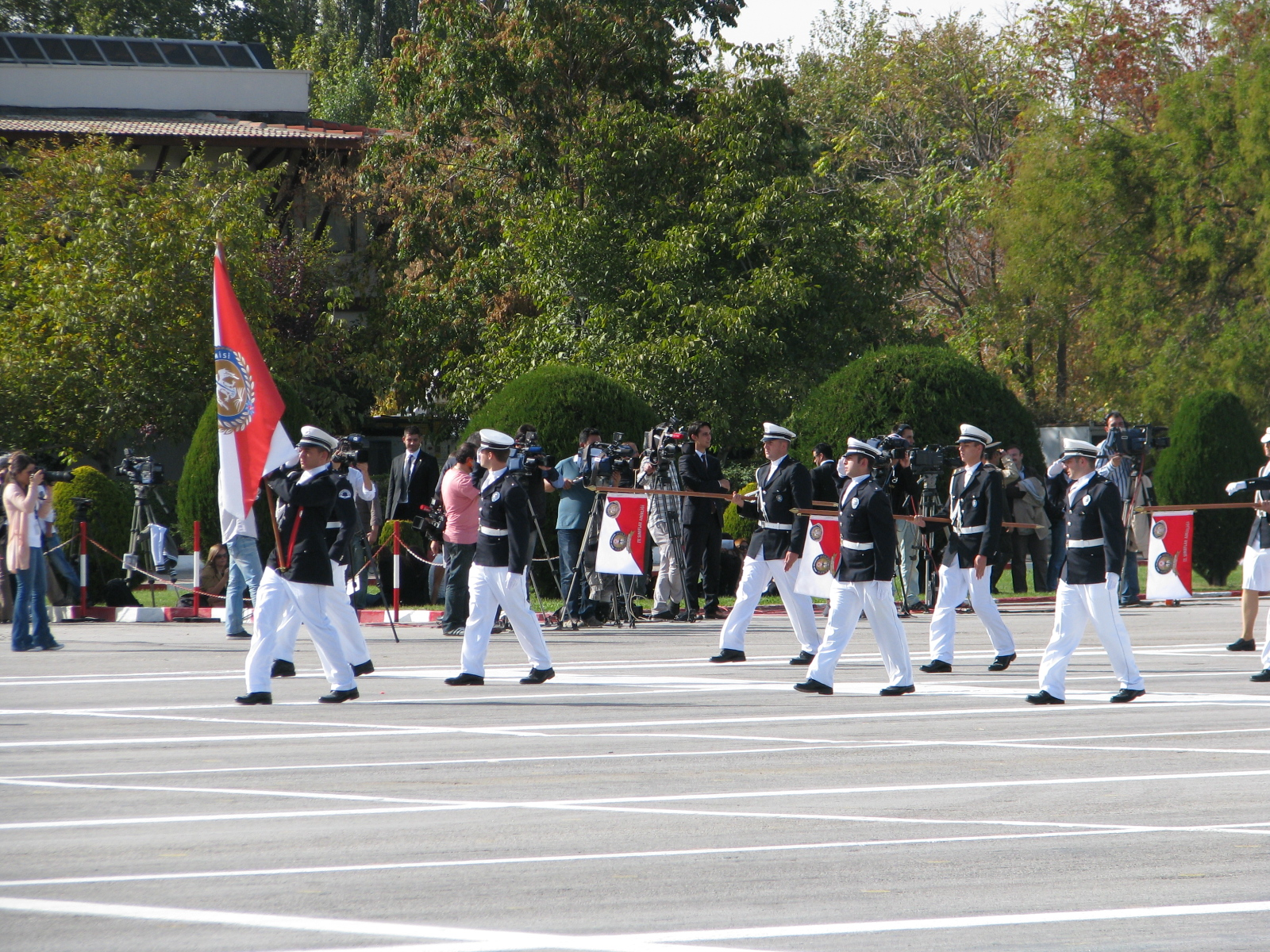
Police Academy during parade

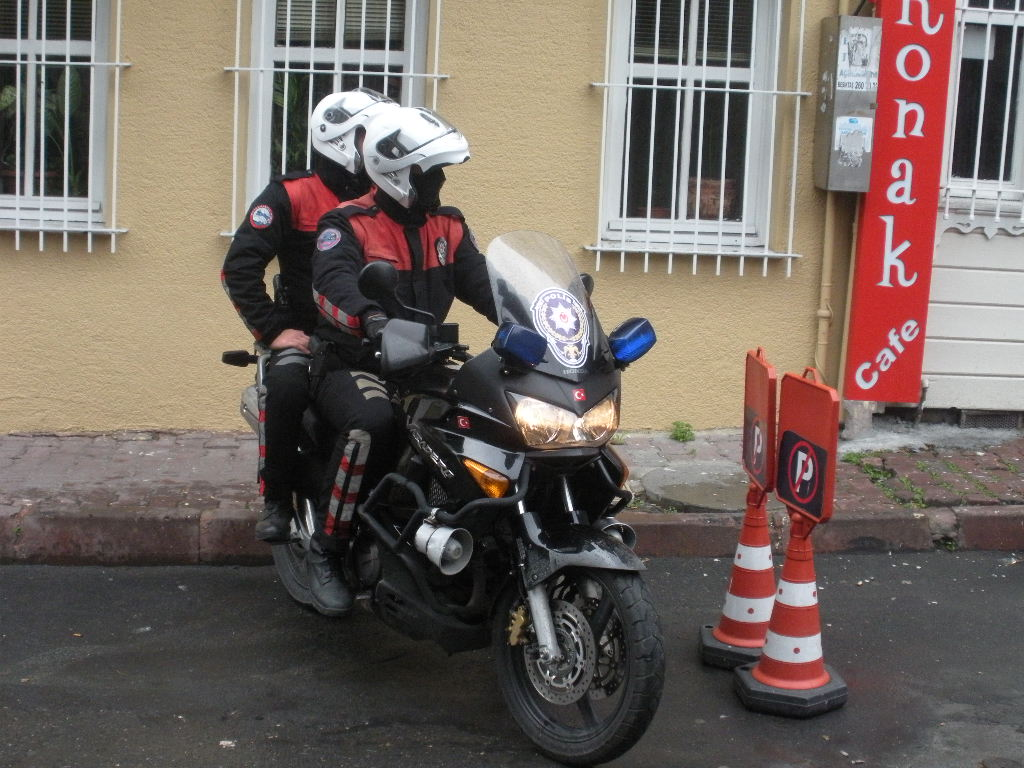
Motorcycle unit Yunuslar

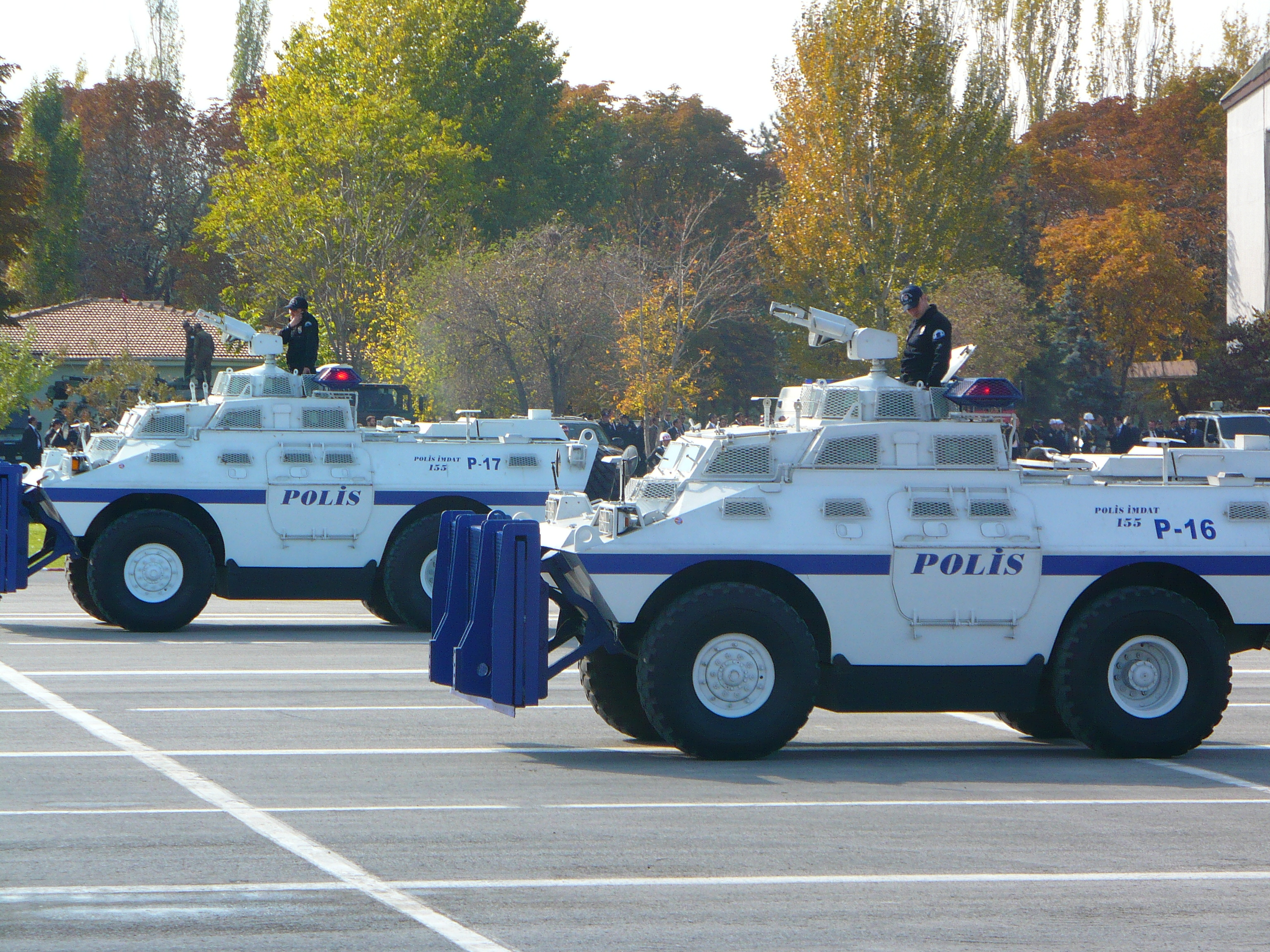
TOMA water cannon in Istanbul, 2013

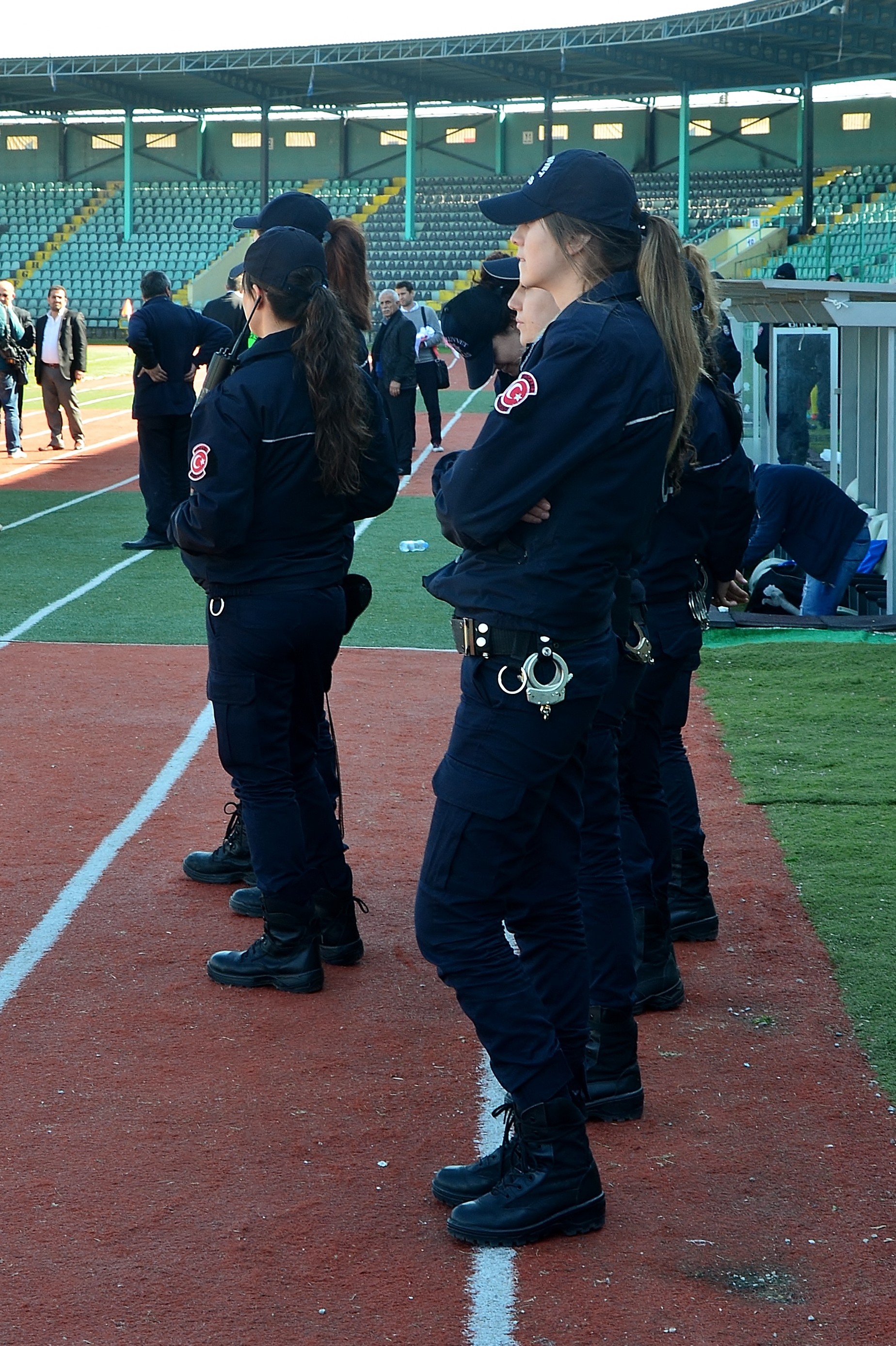
Female riot police squad (Çevik Kuvvet Polis)

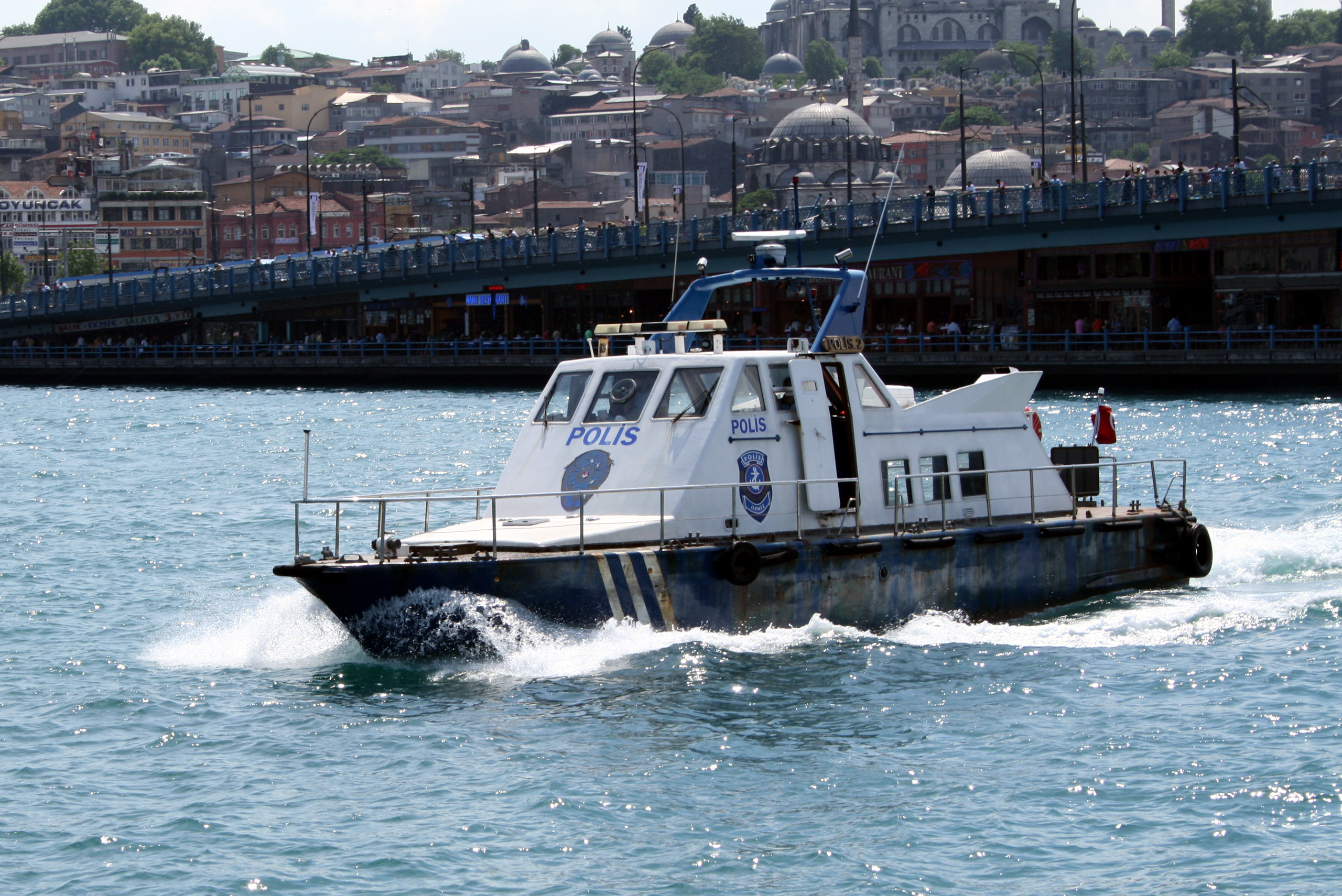
Police patrol boat

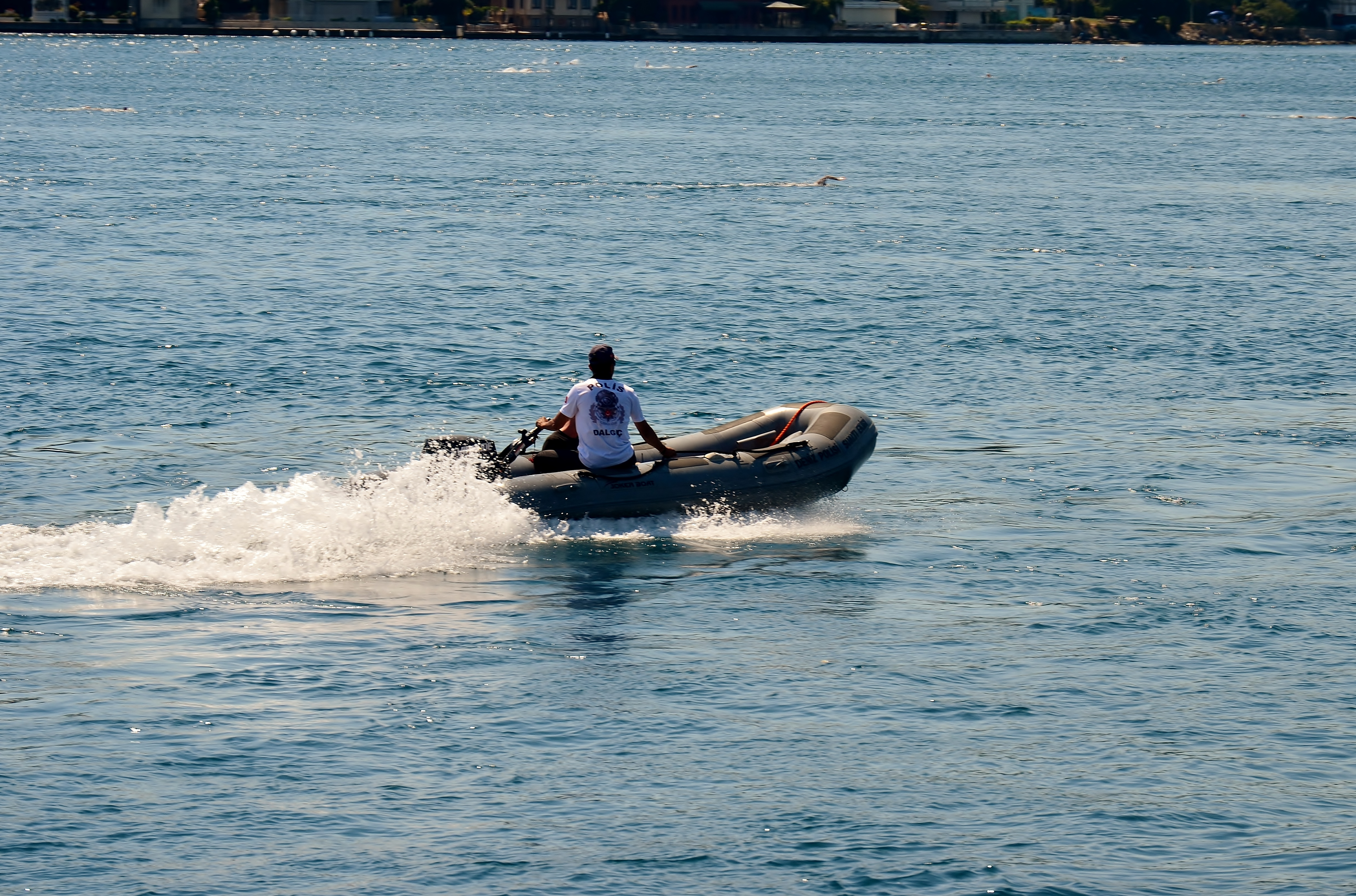
Police diver

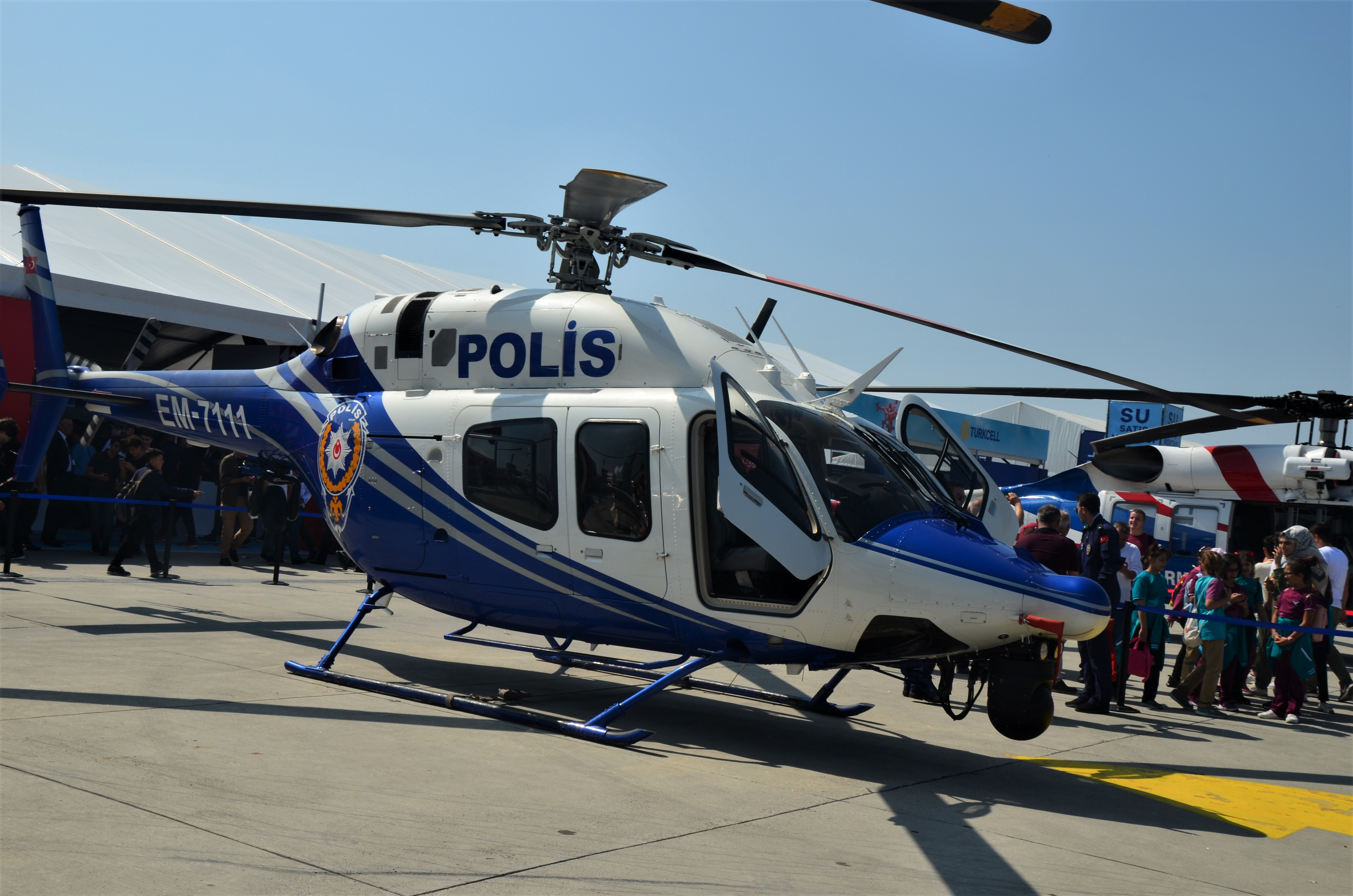
Bell 429 helicopter of Turkish Police Aviation Department

== Training ==
The TNP receives two categories of training, the first being in-service training provided by the Department of Education operating directly under the General Directorate of Security; whereas pre-profession training is provided by the Police Academy.

The Police Academy offers five different training programs:

- Police Schools (2 years)
- Police Training Centers (8 months)
- Police Chiefs Training Center (1 year)
- Security Sciences Institute
- Higher Level Management Training

There are other educational institutions that give expert in-service training, such as the Turkish International Academy Against Drugs and Organized Crime and the Crime Investigation and Research Education Center.

== Ranks and insignia ==
General Directorate of Security
General Directorate of Security	Director general Emniyet Genel Müdürü	1st Degree Police Chief; 1. Sınıf Emniyet Müdürü	2nd Degree Police Chief; 2. Sınıf Emniyet Müdürü	3rd Degree Police Chief; 3. Sınıf Emniyet Müdürü	4th Degree Police Chief; 4. Sınıf Emniyet Müdürü	Superintendent; Emniyet Amiri	Chief inspector Başkomiser	Inspector; Komiser	Deputy-inspector; Komiser Yardımcısı	Sergeant; Kıdemli Başpolis Memuru	Corporal; Başpolis Memuru	Police officer Polis Memuru

== Equipment ==
=== Firearms ===
Model	Origin	Type	References
Yavuz 16	Turkey	Semi-automatic pistol	
Sarsılmaz Kılınç 2000	Turkey	Semi-automatic pistol	
Girsan MC 28 SA	Turkey	Semi-automatic pistol	
TP9 SF Elite-S	Turkey	Semi-automatic pistol	
SAR 9 METE	Turkey	Semi-automatic pistol	
Sarsılmaz Cobra	Turkey	Shotgun	
Sarsılmaz Baba	Turkey	Shotgun	
USAS-12	South Korea	Shotgun	
Heckler & Koch MP5	West Germany	Submachine gun	
SAR 109T	Turkey	Submachine gun	
Uzi	Israel	Submachine gun	
MKEK MPT	Turkey	Rifle	
SAR 223T/P	Turkey	Rifle	
Heckler & Koch HK33	West Germany	Rifle	
Heckler & Koch G3	West Germany	Rifle	
AKM	Soviet Union	Rifle	
M16 rifle	United States	Rifle	
M4 carbine	United States	Rifle	
Heckler & Koch HK417	Germany	Rifle	
IMI Galil	Israel	Rifle	
SIG Sauer SIG516	United States	Rifle	
FN 303	Belgium	Riot control	
Milkor MGL	South Africa	Riot control	
M203 grenade launcher	United States	Riot control	
Penn Arms GL40	United States	Riot control	
TAC40	United States	Riot control	
Canik M2 QCB	Turkey	Machine gun	
M60E6	United States	Machine gun	
M249 SAW	United States	Machine gun	
FN MAG 58	Belgium	Machine gun	
LM8	Turkey	Machine gun	
KMG556	Turkey	Machine gun	
MMG556	Turkey	Machine gun	
SVD Dragunov	Soviet Union	Sniper rifle	
LMT MWS 308	United States	Sniper rifle	
IMI Galatz	Israel	Sniper rifle	
PCL-54C	Romania	Sniper rifle	
Steyr SSG 69PI	Austria	Sniper rifle	
Steyr SSG 08	Austria	Sniper rifle	
Accuracy International AX50	United Kingdom	Sniper rifle	
ASELSAN KANGAL	Turkey	Drone jamming system	
ALKA DEWS	Turkey	Directed energy weapon	
ÇETİN	Turkey	Unmanned ground vehicle	
Cankut-1	Turkey	Combat drones	

=== Patrol Vehicles ===
Vehicle	Image	Origin/Assembly	Type
Patrol cars
TOGG		Turkey	Electric patrol car
Ford Transit Courier		Turkey United States	Most common patrol car
Fiat Doblo		Turkey Italy	Most common patrol car
Renault Mégane		Turkey France	Traffic police car
Renault Symbol		Turkey France	Standard patrol and traffic police car
Hyundai Accent		Turkey South Korea	Traffic police car
Toyota Corolla		Turkey Japan	Traffic and motorway police car
Fiat Egea		Turkey Italy	Patrol car
Toyota Hilux		Turkey Japan	Traffic police car
Renault Fluence		Turkey France	Traffic police car
Renault Kangoo		Turkey France	Patrol car
Ford Transit Connect		Turkey United States	Patrol car
Dacia Duster		Turkey France Romania	Patrol car
Fiat Linea		Turkey Italy	Patrol car
Hyundai Elantra		Turkey South Korea	Traffic police car
Volkswagen Caddy		Turkey Germany	Patrol car
Opel Insignia		Turkey Germany	Traffic police car
Opel Combo Life		Turkey Germany	Patrol car
BMW 320i (F30)		Turkey Germany	Traffic police car
Subaru Impreza		Turkey Japan	Traffic police car
Toyota Prius		Turkey Japan	Patrol car/Traffic police
Mini Cooper		Turkey Germany United Kingdom	Patrol car/Traffic police
Audi A3		Turkey Germany	Patrol car/Traffic police
BMW 120i		Turkey Germany	Patrol car/Traffic police
Nissan Navara		Turkey Japan	Patrol car/Traffic police
Nissan Juke		Turkey Japan	Patrol car/Traffic police
Ferrari 458 Italia		Italy	Traffic police car
Bentley GT		United Kingdom	Traffic police car
Mercedes Benz CLA		Germany	Traffic police car
Mercedes Benz GLS		Germany	Traffic police car
Audi RS6		Germany	Traffic police car
Porsche Taycan		Germany	Traffic police car
Volvo XC90		Sweden	Traffic police car
Range Rover		United Kingdom	Traffic police car
Land Rover Freelander		United Kingdom	Traffic police car
Volkswagen Golf Mk8		Germany	Traffic police car
Peugeot 3008		France	Traffic police car
BMW 5		Germany	Traffic police car
Skoda Kodiaq		Czech Republic	Traffic police car
Ford Ranger		Turkey United States	Forensics car
GMC Yukon		Turkey United States	Presidential Guards car
Patrol motorbikes
BMW R1200 GS		Germany	Patrol motorbike
Honda Africa Twin		Japan	Patrol motorbike
Yamaha Fazer 1/6		Japan	Patrol motorbike
Honda VFR 800		Japan	Patrol motorbike
Vans and busses
Ford Transit		Turkey United States	Patrol van
Ford Transit Custom		Turkey United States	Patrol van
Fiat Ducato		Turkey Italy	Patrol van
Isuzu Turkuaz		Turkey Japan	Patrol bus
Otokar Sultan	-	Turkey	Patrol bus
Katmerciler Kiraç	-	Turkey	Criminal research vehicle

=== Armoured Vehicles ===
Vehicle	Image	Origin/Assembly	Type	Notes
Infantry mobility vehicles/MRAPs				
Otokar Akrep		Turkey	Infantry mobility vehicle	40 in service.
Otokar Cobra		Turkey	Infantry mobility vehicle	
Otokar Cobra II		Turkey	Infantry mobility vehicle	
BMC Kirpi		Turkey	Mine-resistant ambush protected	
BMC Vuran		Turkey	Mine-resistant ambush protected	
Nurol Ejder		Turkey	Mine-resistant ambush protected	417+ vehicles in service
Nurol Yörük		Turkey	Infantry mobility vehicle/Presidential Protection Department car	
Otokar Ural	-	Turkey	Infantry mobility vehicle	230+ vehicles in service.
BMC Amazon	-	Turkey	Multi-purpose armoured vehicle	
Nurol ILGAZ II	-	Turkey	Mine-resistant ambush protected	
Riot control				
TOMA		Turkey	Intervention Vehicle against Social Incidents	
Cadillac Cage Commando V-150S		United States	Amphibious armoured car/Armoured personnel carrier	124 total. Converted into TOMAs.
Dragoon 300		United States	Amphibious armoured fighting vehicle	80 in service Converted into TOMAs.
Unmanned Ground Vehicles				
Aselsan Aslan		Turkey	Medium-class unmanned ground vehicle	
Aselsan Kaplan		Turkey	Light-class unmanned ground vehicle	

=== Boats ===
- Ares 35 FPB -17 boats
- ASBOT KN-35
- 57 patrol boats

=== Coastal Directorate of Security ===
- Multi-purpose fast lifeboats - 16 on order.
- Emergency response tugboats - 2 on order.
- Pilotage service boats - 6 on order.

=== Aircraft ===
Vehicle	Image	Origin	Type	Notes
Aircraft
Beechcraft Super King Air		United States	Utility/Transport aircraft	2 B350i variant in use.
Cessna Citation XLS+		United States	Utility aircraft	1 in service.
Beechcraft C90		United States	Utility aircraft	2 in service.
Helicopters
Sikorsky S-92		United States	VIP Transport helicopter	3 S-92A Used by the Ministry.
Bell 206		United States Canada	Multi-purpose utility helicopter	2 Bell 206L-3 in service.
Bell 429		United States Canada South Korea	Multi-purpose utility helicopter	14 in service.
Sikorsky S-70 Black Hawk		United States Turkey	Medium transport/Utility helicopter	S-70A-D28 & 2 S-70i 18 T-70 on order. 2 T-70 in service
TAI T625 Gökbey		Turkey	Utility helicopter	First batch : 3 on order.
TAI/AgustaWestland T129 ATAK		Turkey Italy	Attack helicopter	4 in T129B service
Unmanned aerial vehicles
TAI Anka		Turkey	MALE UCAV	
Baykar Bayraktar TB2		Turkey	MALE UCAV	
ÇAĞATAY	-	Turkey	VTOL UAV	
UÇBEY	-	Turkey	VTOL UAV	
BULUT	-	Turkey	VTOL UAV	Developed by Havelsan.
Arcturus T-20		United States	Tactical reconnaissance UAV	

Planned Acquisition :

- New liaison and utility aircraft
- BMC Tulga SUV

== See also ==
- Gendarmerie General Command
- List of firefighting equipment of Turkey
