= Gábor Böröndi =

Hungarian military officer (born 1971)

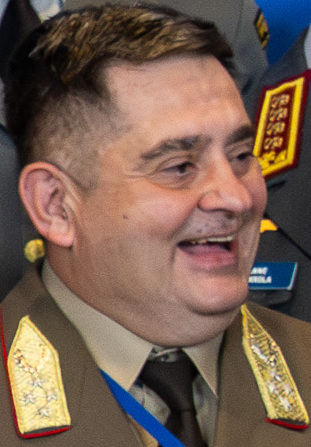
- Böröndi in 2024
- Born: April 6, 1971 (age 55); Kaposvár, Hungary
- Military career
- Allegiance: Hungary
- Branch: Mechanized infantry
- Service years: 1992–present
- Rank: Colonel General
- Commands: Chief of the General Staff
- Conflicts: War in Iraq; War in Afghanistan
- Awards: Ordre national du Mérite Knight's Cross; Officer's Cross of the Order of Merit of Hungary; Knight's Cross of the Order of Merit of Hungary; Commander of the Legion of Merit; Golden Merit Medal for Service with Laurel; Golden Merit Medal for Service; Silver Merit Medal for Service; Bronze Merit Medal for Service; Peacekeeping Service Medal; Service Medal for Flood Protection; Service Medal for Officers 2nd Class; Service Medal for Officers 3rd Class; Migration Crisis Management Service Medal

Gábor Böröndi (born 6 April 1971) is a Hungarian military officer.

Böröndi was promoted to the position of the Deputy Chief of the General Staff by President János Áder, as a Lieutenant General on January 1, 2019, and became Chief of the General Staff of Hungarian Defence Forces in April 2023. Polish ambassador addressed his remarks regarding the Invasion of Poland. On August 20, 2023. Katalin Novák, President of Hungary promoted him to Colonel General.

== Career ==
1992 – 1996 HDF 26th Mechanized Infantry Brigade "János Bottyán", Lenti

1996 – 1999 HDF 4th Mechanized Corps Command, Székesfehérvár

1999 – 2006 Ministry of Defence, Budapest

2006 – 2013 HDF 5th Infantry Brigade "István Bocskai", Debrecen

2013 – 2017 HDF Forces Command, Székesfehérvár

2018 – 2019 Ministry of Defence, General Staff, Budapest

2019 – Deputy Chief of the General Staff

2021 – Military Representative of Hungary in NATO

2023 – Chief of the General Staff, Budapest

== Awards and decorations ==

1st row	Hungarian Order of Merit Officer's Cross on military ribbon	Hungarian Order of Merit Knight's Cross military ribbon	Merit Medal for Service with Laurel Wreath	Merit Medal for Service Gold Cross
2nd row	Merit Medal for Service Silver Cross	Merit Medal for Service Bronze Cross	Peacekeeping Service Medal (Hungary) for service in Afghanistan	Peacekeeping Service Medal (Hungary) for service in Afghanistan
3rd row	Peacekeeping Service Medal (Hungary) for service in Cyprus (UNFICYP)	Peacekeeping Service Medal (Hungary) for service in Yugoslavia (SFOR)	Service Medal for Flood Protection	Migration Crisis Management Service Medal
4th row	Service Medals for Officers 2nd class	Service Medals for Officers 3rd class	Ordre national du Mérite	Commander of the Legion of Merit

Military offices
Preceded by Lt. Gen. Romulusz Ruszin-Szendi	Chief of the General Staff; 27 April 2023 –	Succeeded by
