= Gidrán (vehicle) =

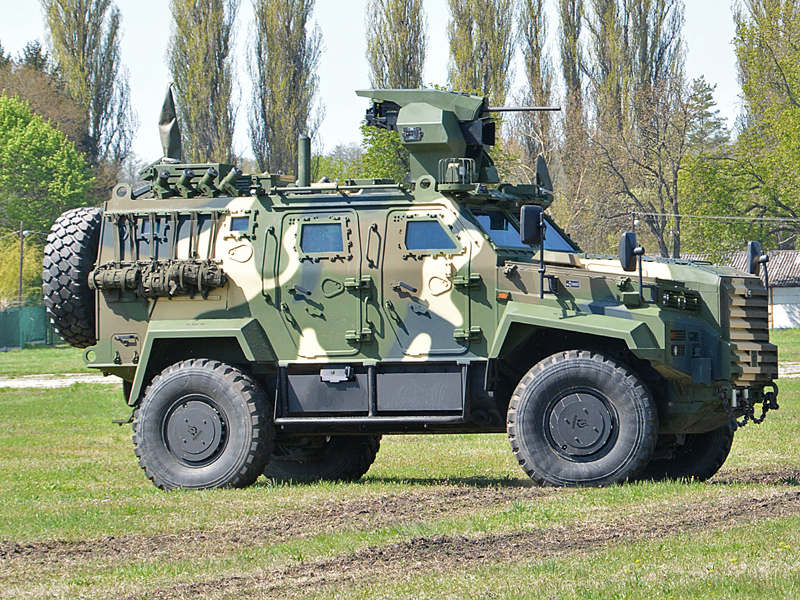
- Gidrán 4x4 in Hungarian service.
- Type: Armoured combat vehicle
- Place of origin: Hungary

Service history
- Used by: Hungary

Production history
- Manufacturer: Nurol Makina (first 50); Rheinmetall Hungary for any subsequent production
- Produced: 2021

Specifications
- Mass: 14,000 kg
- Length: 5.8m
- Width: 2.5m
- Height: 2.5m
- Crew: 1+7
- Armor: Up to STANAG-4569 Level 4
- Main armament: Aselsan’s Stabilised Advanced Remote Weapon Platform (SARP) (current deliveries) armed with light or heavy machine gun, or automatic grenade launcher
- Engine: 6-cylinder turbocharged Cummins diesel 375 hp
- Operational range: 700 km
- Maximum speed: 120 km/h

The Gidrán is a family of Hungarian armoured tactical vehicles, based on the Turkish Ejder Yalçın vehicles by Nurol Makina.

== History ==
=== Development ===
The development of the Gidrán platform by a new Hungarian joint venture was announced on December 21, 2020, in Budapest. According to the press release, the new company was founded by the Hungarian firm HT Division Zrt., a licensee of Nurol Makina, and Rheinmetall Hungary Zrt., itself a joint venture between Germany's Rheinmetall Defence and the Government of Hungary. The primary user of the Gidrán will be the Hungarian Defence Forces.

The first 50 vehicles are being built in Turkey as standard Ejder Yalçın 4×4, with the initial batch of 10 vehicles having been delivered and entered Hungarian service in December 2020.

Later vehicles will be designed in Rheinmetall Hungary's new development and manufacturing center in Zalaegerszeg, the same plant where the Lynx KF41HU tracked infantry fighting vehicles are also being developed. The first locally developed prototypes are expected to enter testing in 2021 and manufacturing will start at a new plant near Kaposvár.

=== Description ===
The Hungarian vehicles technically constitute a 4th generation Ejder Yalçin with specific modifications for the Hungarian Defence Forces including LED lighting and improved ergonomics. Examples already delivered by Nurol Makina are fitted with an auxiliary power unit on the rear left of the vehicle, as well as Aselsan's Stabilised Advanced Remote Weapon Platform (SARP) featuring SEDA directional gunshot detection system.

== Operators ==
- Hungary: The Hungarian Army is expected to receive 300+ Gidráns. On February 9, 2021, the first 10 fully integrated Gidrán 4x4 vehicles were delivered to the 25th Infantry Brigade "György Klapka" in Tata.

== See also ==
- Ejder Yalçın 4×4
- Lynx KF41
