= ILGAZ II 4X4 =

ILGAZ 4x4 is a Turkish made Mine-Resistant Ambush Protected vehicle built by Nurol Makina. ILGAZ is designed and manufactured by the Turkish armored vehicle manufacturer Nurol Makina. to meet the requirements of the Turkish Land Forces.

== Operators ==
- Ivory Coast
- Rwanda
