= 1st Armored Brigade "György Klapka" =

- MH Klapka György 1. Páncélosdandár
- Active: 1 March 2007 – present (in current form); October 1950 - present (with predecessors)
- Country: Hungary
- Branch: Hungarian Ground Forces
- Type: Mechanized infantry
- Locations: Tata
- Mottos: "Hittel, Becsülettel!"
- Engagements: War in Afghanistan

The 1st Armored Brigade "György Klapka" (Hungarian: MH Klapka György 1. Páncélosdandár), is a brigade of the Hungarian Defence Forces.

== History ==
The brigade has been restructured several times since its inception more than six decades ago. The predecessor of the brigade was the 17th Heavy Tank and Assault Gun Regiment. The formation of this regiment began in October 1950, and then the actual training of the troops began in November in Székesfehérvár. It was deployed to Baj in 1953, when it was renamed the 31st Heavy Tank and Assault Gun Regiment. In 1957, the regiment moved to its current location, Tata.

In 1961, the T-34 tanks were replaced by T-34M tanks, then in 1962, for the first time in the Hungarian People's Army, the unit was equipped with T-55 tanks. In 1978, the regiment was equipped with T-72 tanks. In 1987, the regiment was reorganized as a tank brigade and renamed 25th Tank Brigade "György Klapka". In 1997, the brigade was renamed 25th Mechanized Rifle Brigade "György Klapka". In May 2004, the brigade was renamed 25th Light Infantry Brigade "György Klapka". On 1 March 2007, the brigade was renamed to 25th Infantry Brigade "György Klapka".

With the Hungarian Defence Forces military modernization program, several new types of vehicles and equipment have been delivered to the brigade: twelve Leopard 2A4HU were delivered to the brigade's tank battalion to serve as a training platform for the incoming Leopard 2A7+ vehicles and on 9 February 2021, ten Gidrán vehicles were delivered to the brigade's 36th Anti-tank Missile Battalion.

On 1 January 2023, the 25th Infantry Brigade "György Klapka" was reorganized and renamed 1st Armored Brigade "György Klapka".

== Organization ==
- 1st Armored Brigade "György Klapka", in Tata
  - Command and Signals Company, in Tata
  - 1st Rifle Battalion, in Tata; with BTR-80 armored personnel carriers (being replaced by KF41 Lynx infantry fighting vehicles)
  - 2nd Rifle Battalion, in Kaposvár; with BTR-80 armored personnel carriers (being replaced by KF41 Lynx infantry fighting vehicles)
  - 11th Tank Battalion "Ervin Tarczay", in Tata; with Leopard 2A7+ main battle tanks
  - 36th Anti-tank Missile Battalion, in Tata; with Gidrán vehicles and Spike LR2 anti-tank guided missiles
  - 1st Self-Propelled Artillery Battalion "József Barankay", in Tata; with Panzerhaubitze 2000 155 mm self-propelled howitzers
  - Logistics Battalion, in Tata
