= 11th Armored Hajduk Brigade "István Bocskai" =

Hungarian military unit

- MH Bocskai István 11. Páncélozott Hajdúdandár
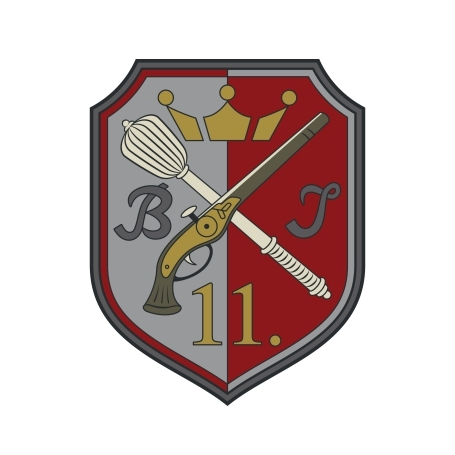
- Brigade coat of arms
- Active: 1 November 1951; 74 years ago to present
- Country: Hungary
- Branch: Hungarian Ground Forces
- Type: Mechanized infantry
- Size: Regiment (1951-1987); Brigade (1987-Present)
- Locations: Mezőtúr (1951-1991); Debrecen (1991-Present)
- Patron: István Bocskai

The 11th Armored Hajduk Brigade "István Bocskai" (Hungarian: MH Bocskai István 11. Páncélozott Hajdúdandár), is a brigade of the Hungarian Defence Forces.

== History ==
On 1 November 1951, the brigade was formed as a motor rifle regiment in Mezőtúr. In 1987, the regiment was reorganized as a mechanized infantry brigade and in 1990-91 the brigade moved to Debrecen.

On September 29, 1990, the brigade adopted the name of István Bocskai. In 2004, the sub-units previously located in Nyíregyháza moved to Debrecen and Hajdúhadház. At the same time, two mixed light battalions belonging to the 62nd Mechanized Infantry Brigade "Miklós Bercsényi" based in Hódmezővásárhely, were assigned to the brigade.

The brigade was again reorganized in 2007. On 1 March 2007, the Minister of Defence established the 5th Infantry Brigade "István Bocskai" of the Hungarian Defense Forces. The same year, a reconnaissance battalion located in Eger moved to the Debrecen and was assigned to the brigade.

On 1 January 2023, the 5th Infantry Brigade "István Bocskai" was reorganized and renamed 11th Armored Hajduk Brigade "István Bocskai". On the same date the brigade's battalions in Hódmezővásárhely were transferred to the newly formed 30th Armored Infantry Brigade "Pál Kinizsi".

== Organization ==
- 11th Armored Hajduk Brigade "István Bocskai", in Debrecen
  - Command and Signals Company, in Debrecen
  - 39th Rifle Battalion, in Debrecen; with BTR-80 armored personnel carriers (being replaced by Gidrán vehicles)
  - (A second rifle battalion will be formed)
  - Logistics Battalion, in Debrecen
  - Combat Support Engineer Company, in Debrecen

== See also ==
- List of military units named after people
