= Hungarian Ground Forces =

Land branch of the Hungarian Defence Forces

- Magyar Szárazföldi Haderő
- Unit colour
- Country: Hungary
- Allegiance: Hungarian Defence Forces
- Branch: Ground Forces
- Size: 32,000 active duty personnel
- Part of: Hungarian Defence Forces
- Garrison/HQ: Székesfehérvár
- Colors: Red, White and Green
- Anniversaries: 29 September

Commanders
- Current commander: Brig. Gen. Gábor Lőrincz

The Hungarian Ground Forces (Hungarian: Magyar Szárazföldi Haderő, Hungarian pronunciation: [ˈmɒɟɒr ˈsaːrɒzføldi ˈhɒdɛrøː]) constitute the land branch of the Hungarian Defence Forces, responsible for ground activities and troops, including artillery, tanks, Armoured Personnel Carriers (APCs), Infantry Fighting Vehicles (IFVs), and ground support. The ground forces have a history of service in Iraq and are currently engaged in the KFOR (Kosovo Force) operation.

The predecessors of the Hungarian ground forces include the Royal Hungarian Landwehr, the Royal Hungarian Army, and the ground force components of the Hungarian People's Army. During the Cold War, Hungary was aligned with the Soviet Union and was a member of the Warsaw Pact. However, following the fall of the Soviet Union in 1991, Hungary significantly reduced the number of tanks and troops and closed several garrisons. The Hungarian Army now focuses on national security, peacekeeping, and international conflicts. Notably, Hungary became a member of NATO in 1999.

== History ==
In 1963, the Ground Forces of Hungary comprised the 5th Army, established in 1961 at Székesfehérvár. This formation included the 7th Motor Rifle Division in Kiskunfélegyháza, the 8th Motor Rifle Division in Zalaegerszeg, the 9th Motor Rifle Division in Kaposvár, and the 11th Tank Division in Tata. Additionally, the 34th Special Reconnaissance Battalion in Székesfehérvár operated as a sub-unit of the 5th Army. Another significant combat formation was the 3rd Army Corps in Cegléd, which comprised the 4th Motor Rifle Division in Gyöngyös and the 15th Motor Rifle Division in Nyíregyháza.

According to Michael Holm, the 3rd Army Corps stationed at Cegléd, designated as Military Unit Number 6639, was established on 1 November 1966. It maintained the same organizational structure in 1970 and 1980. However, by 1988, it underwent restructuring, now comprising four mechanized infantry brigades, one tank brigade, one artillery brigade, and three artillery regiments (AA Missile, Anti-Aircraft Artillery, and Anti-Tank Artillery), alongside other smaller units.

Following the dissolution of the Warsaw Pact in 1991, both the 5th Army and the 3rd Mechanized Corps were disbanded. The Hungarian Defense Forces inherited the assets and personnel of the Hungarian People's Army. However, owing to the altered geopolitical landscape and economic constraints, the Army underwent substantial force reduction and asset adjustments.

After Hungary's accession to NATO, the procurement of newer and more modern multi-purpose equipment began. This included various vehicles, communication equipment, unmanned aerial vehicles, and the modernization of existing assets such as radar locators and anti-aircraft missile complexes. However, the lack of resources in the armed forces limited significant improvements until the mid-2010s.

In 2021, the Hungarian Ground Forces completed their mission in Afghanistan and announced the conclusion of evacuations on August 26, 2021. Airlift operations successfully evacuated 540 people, including Hungarian citizens, Afghans, and their families who had previously worked for Hungarian forces. Before the withdrawal, the number of Hungarian troops present in Afghanistan had already been reduced to ten.

== Structure ==
As of January 2025, the primary formations of the Hungarian Ground Forces are:

- Joint Forces Operations Command, in Székesfehérvár
  - 1st Armored Brigade "György Klapka", in Tata
    - Command and Signals Company, in Tata
    - 1st Rifle Battalion, in Tata; with BTR-80 armored personnel carriers (being replaced by KF41 Lynx infantry fighting vehicles)
    - 2nd Rifle Battalion, in Kaposvár; with BTR-80 armored personnel carriers (being replaced by KF41 Lynx infantry fighting vehicles)
    - 11th Tank Battalion "Ervin Tarczay", in Tata; with Leopard 2A7+ main battle tanks
    - 36th Anti-tank Missile Battalion, in Tata; with Gidrán vehicles and Spike LR2 anti-tank guided missiles
    - 1st Self-Propelled Artillery Battalion "József Barankay", in Tata; with Panzerhaubitze 2000 155 mm self-propelled howitzers
    - Logistics Battalion, in Tata
  - 11th Armored Hajduk Brigade "István Bocskai", in Debrecen
    - Command and Signals Company, in Debrecen
    - 39th Rifle Battalion, in Debrecen; with BTR-80 armored personnel carriers (being replaced by Gidrán vehicles)
    - (A second rifle battalion will be formed)
    - Logistics Battalion, in Debrecen
    - Combat Support Engineer Company, in Debrecen
  - 30th Armored Infantry Brigade "Pál Kinizsi", in Hódmezővásárhely
    - Command and Signals Company, in Hódmezővásárhely
    - 3rd Rifle Battalion "Miklós Bercsényi", in Hódmezővásárhely; with KF41 Lynx infantry fighting vehicles
    - 62nd Rifle Battalion, in Hódmezővásárhely; with BTR-80 armored personnel carriers (being replaced by KF41 Lynx infantry fighting vehicles)
    - Logistics Battalion, in Hódmezővásárhely
  - 1st Explosive Ordnance Disposal and River Flotilla Regiment "Honvéd", at Újpest military port in Budapest
    - Explosive Ordnance Disposal and Minesweeper Battalion
    - 1st Explosive Ordnance Disposal Company
    - 2nd Explosive Ordnance Disposal Company
    - River Flotilla
    - Logistics Company
  - 2nd Reconnaissance Regiment "Gergely Bornemissza", in Debrecen
    - Command and Signals Company, in Debrecen
    - Reconnaissance Company, in Debrecen
    - Long-range Reconnaissance Company, in Debrecen
    - Tactical Intelligence (HUMINT) Company, in Debrecen
    - Electronic Warfare Company, in Debrecen
    - Unmanned Aerial Vehicles Company, in Debrecen
    - Logistics Company, in Debrecen
  - 14th Engineer Regiment "Ferenc Rákóczi II", in Szentes
    - Command Support Company, in Szentes
    - Operational Support Engineer Battalion, in Szentes
    - Bridge Building Battalion, in Szentes
    - Technical Support Battalion, in Szentes
    - Logistics Company, in Szentes
  - 102nd Chemical Warfare Regiment "László Sodró", in Székesfehérvár
    - Command Support Platoon
    - CBRN-Defence Battalion
    - CBRN-Defence Company
    - CBRN-Support Company
    - Disaster Management Department
    - Operational Evaluation Department
    - Hungarian Defence Forces Laboratory
    - Chemical Safety Information Center

== Ranks and insignia ==
=== Commissioned officer ranks ===
The rank insignia of commissioned officers.

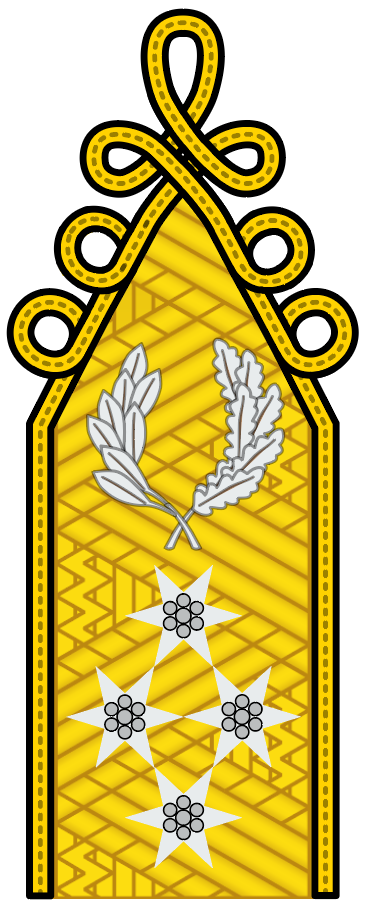
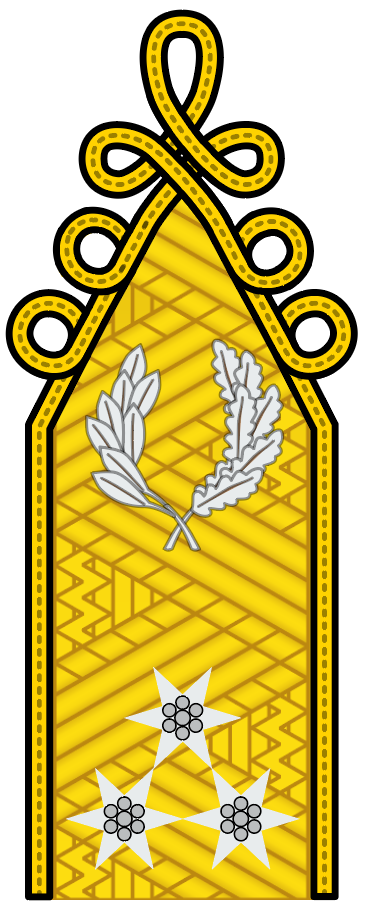
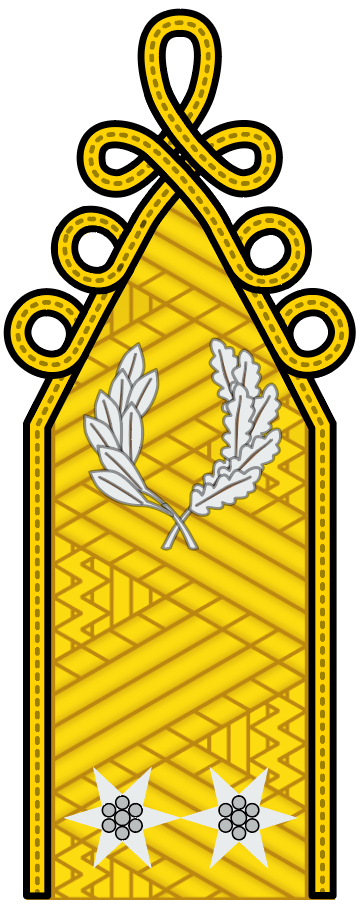
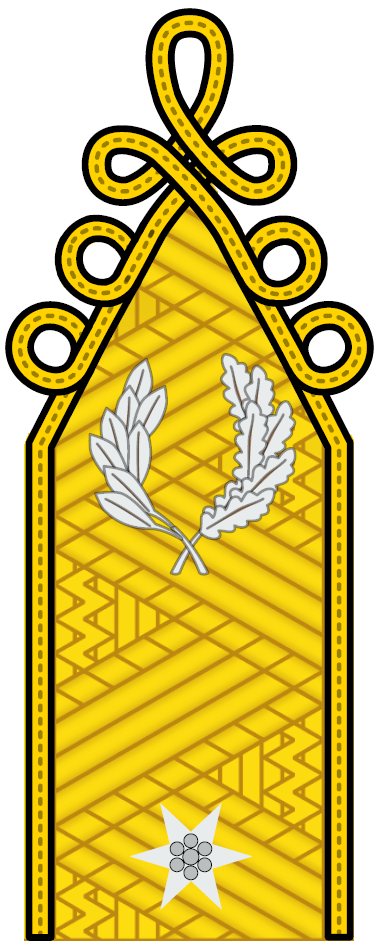
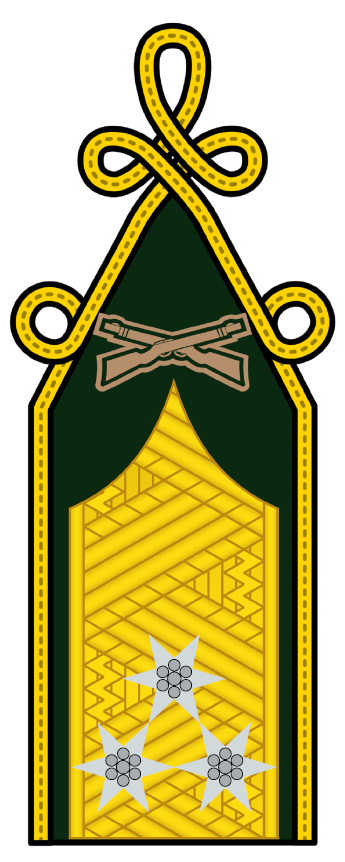
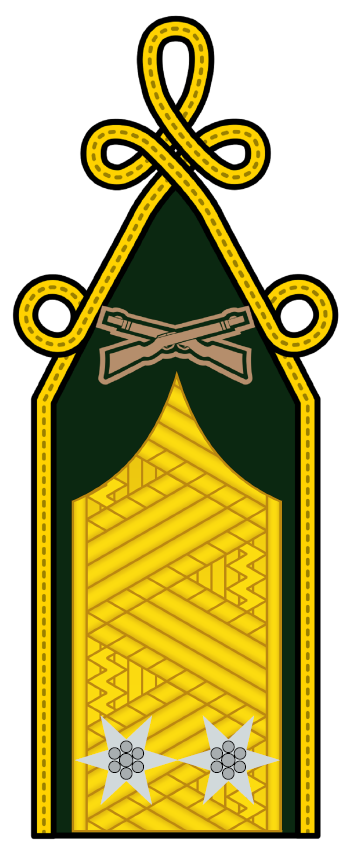
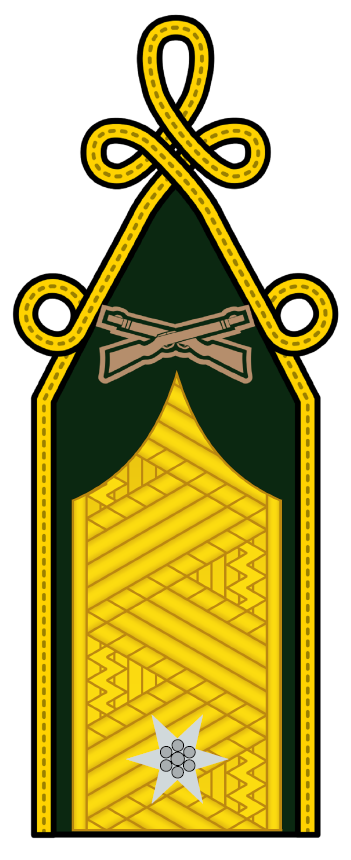
NATO code	OF-10	OF-9	OF-8	OF-7	OF-6	OF-5	OF-4	OF-3	OF-2	OF-1
Hungarian Ground Forces
Hungarian Ground Forces		Vezérezredes	Altábornagy	Vezérőrnagy	Dandártábornok	Ezredes	Alezredes	Őrnagy	Százados	Főhadnagy	Hadnagy

=== Other ranks ===
The rank insignia of non-commissioned officers and enlisted personnel.

NATO code	OR-9	OR-8		OR-7	OR-6	OR-5	OR-4	OR-3	OR-2	OR-1
Hungarian Ground Forces
Hungarian Ground Forces	Főtörzszászlós	Törzszászlós	Zászlós	Főtörzsőrmester	Törzsőrmester	Őrmester	Szakaszvezető	Tizedes	Őrvezető	Közkatona

== See also ==
- Military of Hungary
- Royal Hungarian Army (1922–1945)
- Royal Hungarian Landwehr (1867–1918)
