= Vehicle registration plates of Hungary =

Hungary
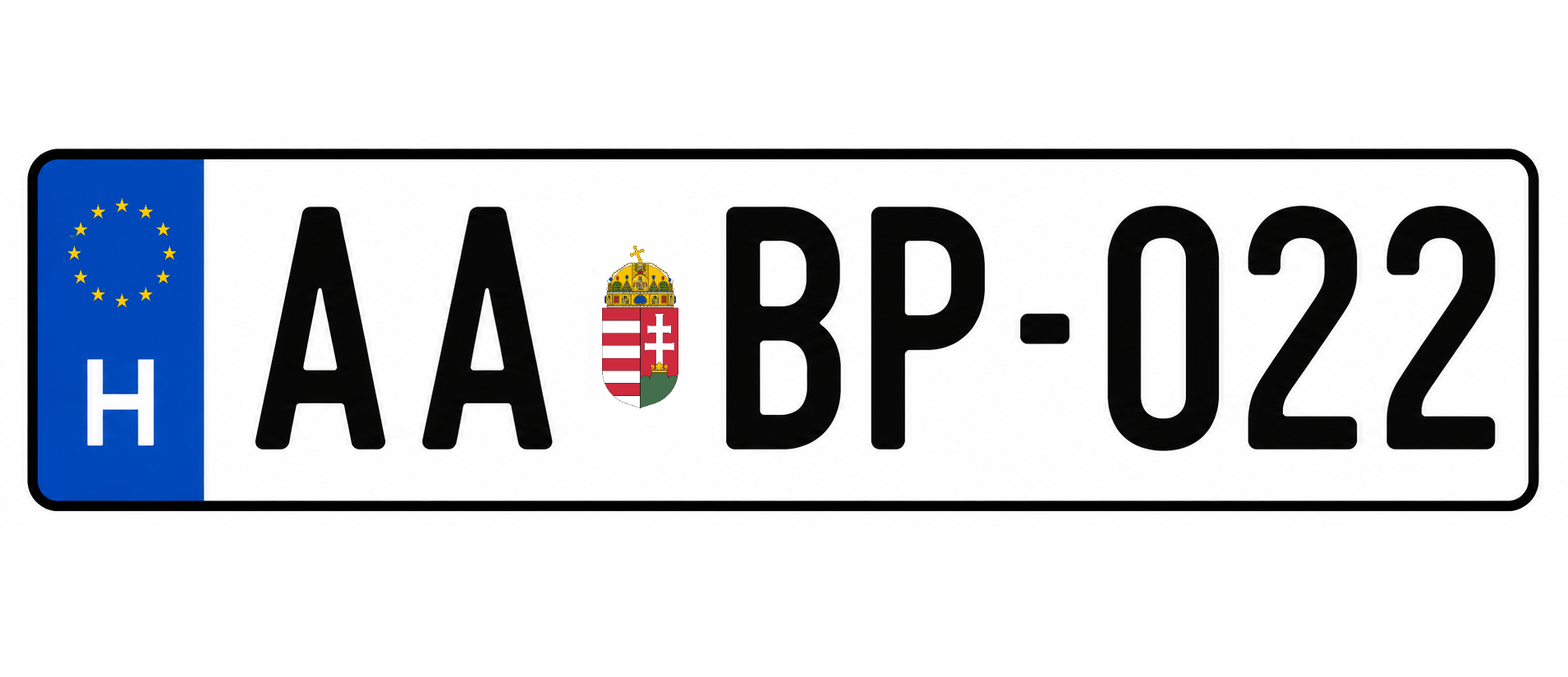
- New standard plate from 1 July 2022.
- Country: Hungary
- Country code: H

Current series
- Size: 520 mm × 110 mm 20.5 in × 4.3 in
- Serial format: AAAA–123
- Colour (front): Black on white
- Colour (rear): Black on white

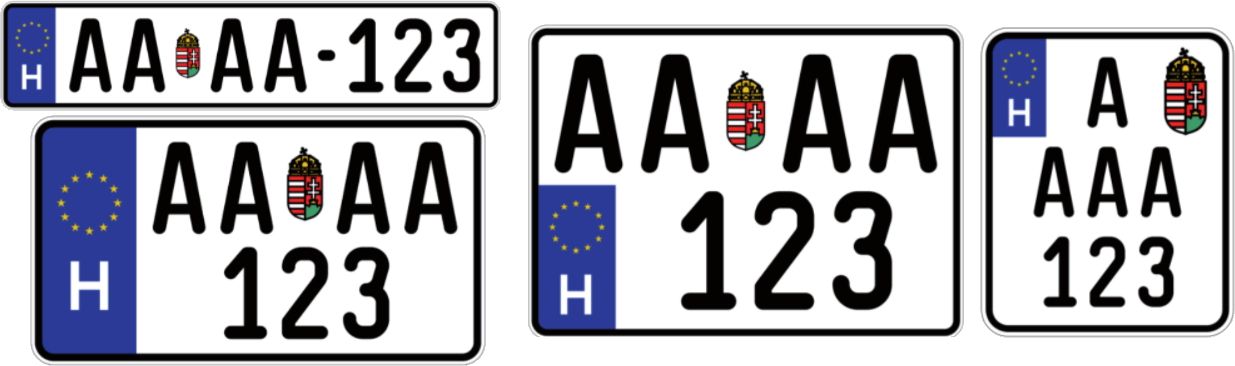
New standard license plate from 1 July 2022

Vehicle registration plates in Hungary usually consist of seven characters on white background with black letters. The current system was introduced on 1 July 2022 (e.g. AA AB 123). The standard license plates for private vehicles carry four letters and three numbers, separated with coat of arms between the letters and hyphen before the numbers. The combination has no connection with geographic location.

== The current system ==
In 2012 the Hungarian government wanted to replace the license plates with a new system that would indicate the geographical area where the car was registered. The idea of this new system was permanently discarded. Based on the number of license plates issued in a year, the previous system would have enough combinations approximately until 2025. Rumors have started in May 2021 about a system which would consist of four letters and three numbers and would be introduced in 2022.

On 1 June 2021 a new Ordinance was published by the Government. This determines the new format which was introduced on 1 July 2022. Ordinary plates will consist of four letters and three numbers and will use a new font type as well. Plates will include the Hungarian coat of arms after the first two letters. The first two letters may only be either both vowels or both consonants. Green and grey plates will be available, just as in the previous system. Some special plate types ceased to exist and were replaced with a general "I" plate (see special plates below). Also, there are several types with special prefixes: TX - Taxi, OT - Old Timer, CD - Diplomatic (same as the previous, except for the font type), BA - Prison Service, RA - Police, HA - Military, MA - Ambulance, NA - National Tax and Customs Administration.

Series	First issued on	Range	Notes
AA	July 1, 2022	AA AA-001 to AA MH-999	AA AA-001 can be seen in the Transportation Museum along with the last plate of the previous system, THW-647
AE	1 March 2023	AE AA-001 to AE MZ-999	
AI	March 2024	AI AA-001 to AI MZ-999	
AO	February 2025	AO AA-001 to AO TZ-999	
AU	April 2026	AU AA-001 to present	Initially not issued for passenger vehicles.

== History ==
Many different license plate formats were in use in Hungarian history. Below is just a short summary of the different systems before the one used nowadays.

=== Early times, World Wars and the Rákosi era: 1901–1958 ===
The first registration plates were handed out in 1901, when Hungary was part of the Austro-Hungarian Empire. This contained numbers only and just a couple of hundred vehicles were registered until 1910. In 1910 a new system was introduced which divided the country into 15 districts. Regional codes were followed by numbers on the plates. Owing to the larger number of vehicles, from 1922, plates also included the year of issue next to the regional code. The same regional system was maintained until 1933, even though the territory of Hungary was significantly reduced after the Treaty of Trianon. In 1933 the regional system was changed to a two letter - three number format. Front plates were rectangle, rear plates were square shaped. In the 1940s, in and shortly after the years of the World War II the format was temporarily changed to one letter - four number. From 1948 the previous two letter - three number format returned. In the years of the harsh communism there were only a few private cars, most of the vehicles were owned by the state, there was no need of expanding the number of characters.

=== Socialist era: 1958–1990 ===
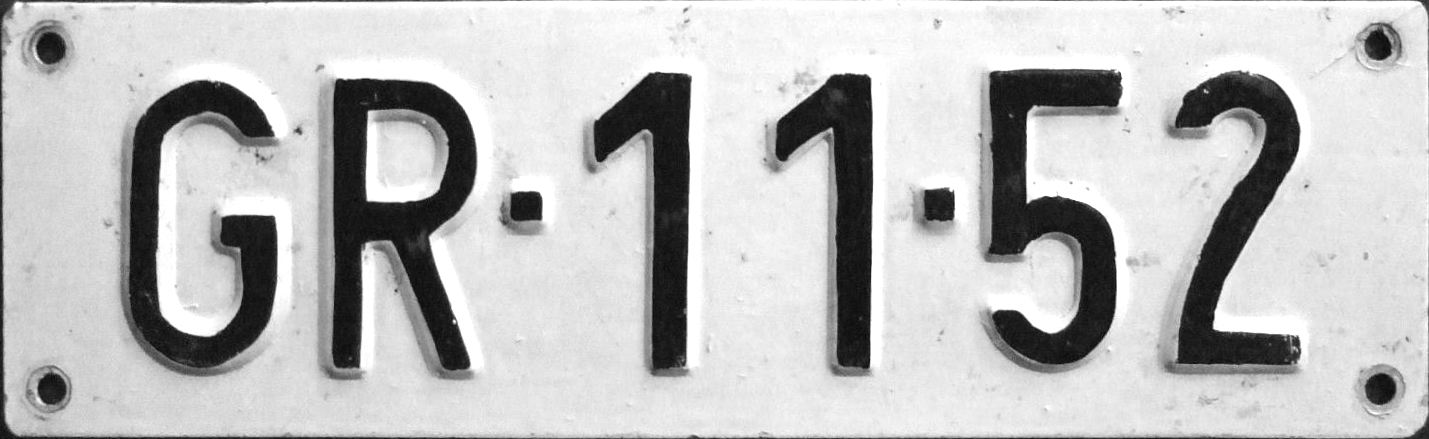
1958–1990 plate

From 1958 citizens were allowed to buy a vehicle for private purposes, the format was changed to two letter and four number, with short dashes between them (e.g.: AB·12·34). The letters were in connection with the type/nature/owner of the vehicle. Standard plates had black characters on white background, commercial vehicles had so called "inverse" plates, white characters on black background. Diplomatic plates had blue background (just as nowadays).

=== The previous system: 1990–2022 ===
EU section used after May 2004

There were almost 2 million cars in traffic in 1990 which required the introduction of a new system. The previous three letter - three number format was introduced in 1990 with the Hungarian flag above ‘H’ on the left side of the plate, separated by a black vertical line. This was slightly modified from May 1, 2004 (when Hungary joined the European Union ) the EU stars are shown above the ‘H’ on a blue stripe. However, some plate types are still issued in the pre-2004 format.

==== Ordinary plates ====
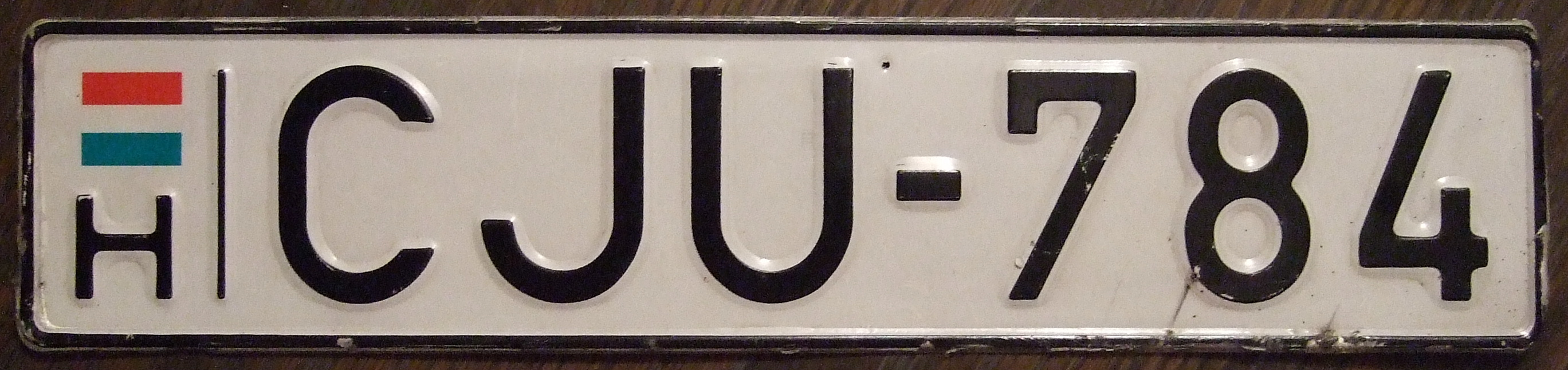
Ordinary series (1990–2004 style)

Ordinary series (2004–2022 style)

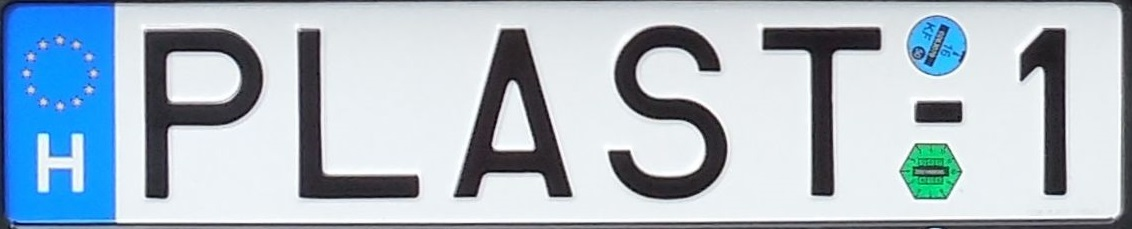
Personalised plate

Green electric vehicle plate

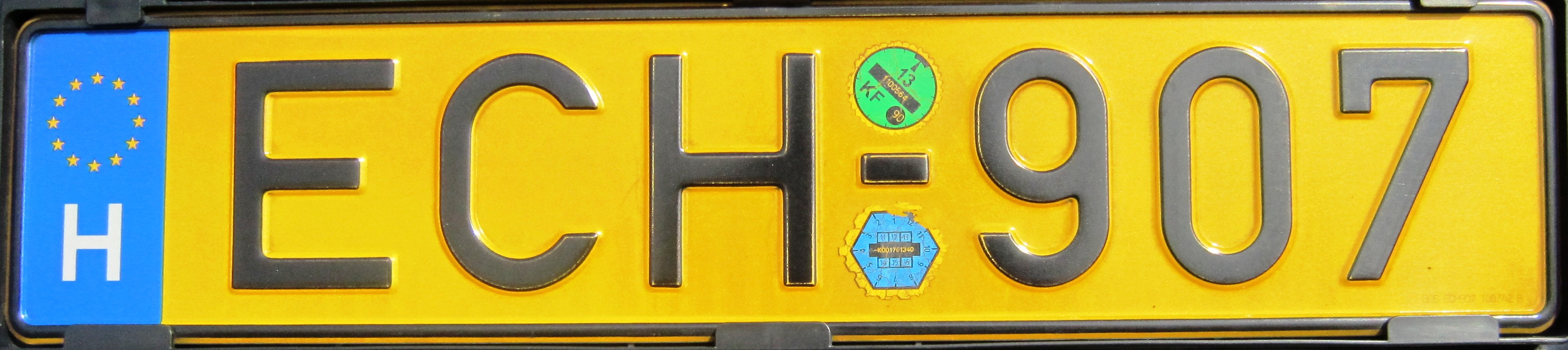
Taxi plate

Commercial truck plate (note the different shade of yellow)

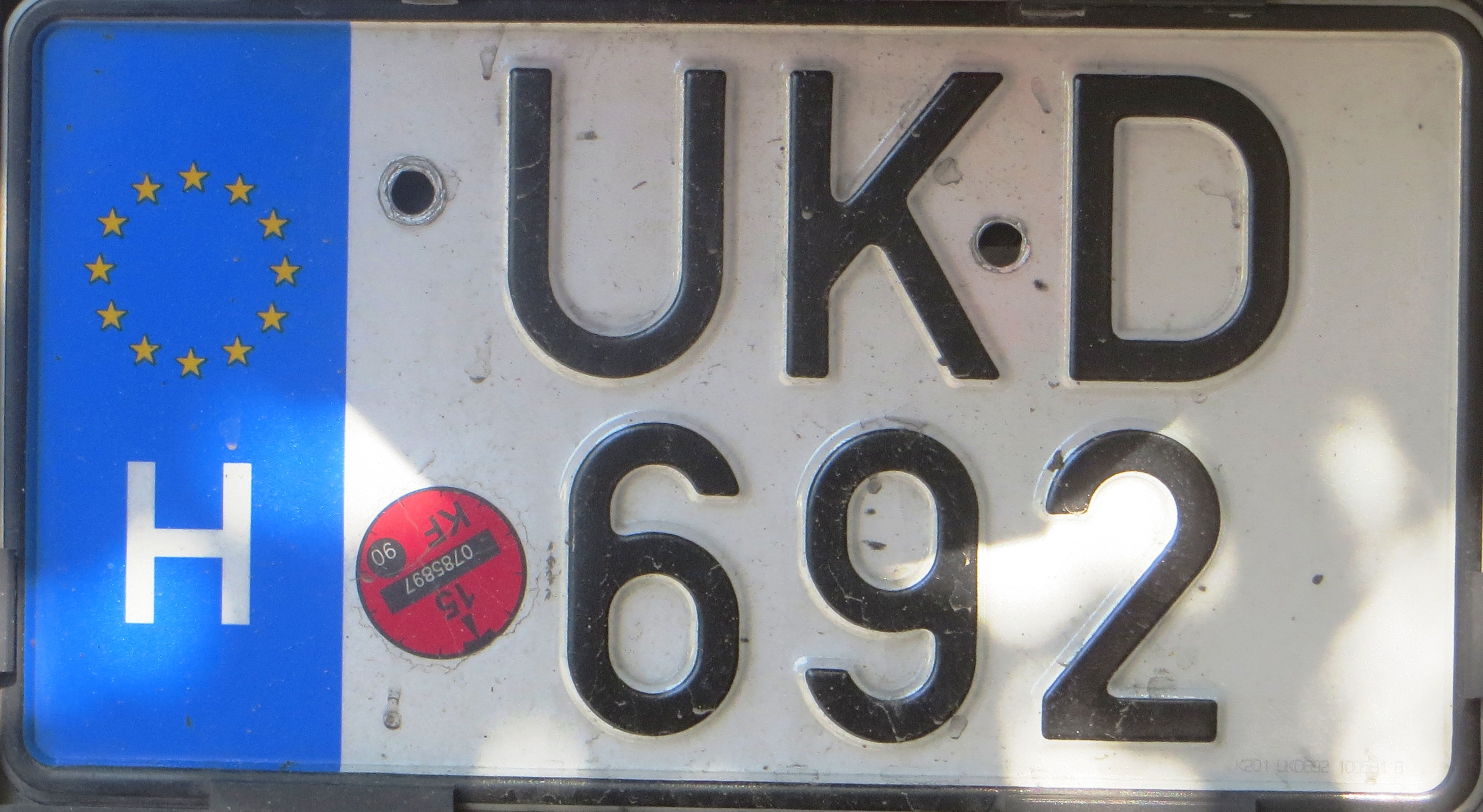
Motorcycle plate

Trailer plate

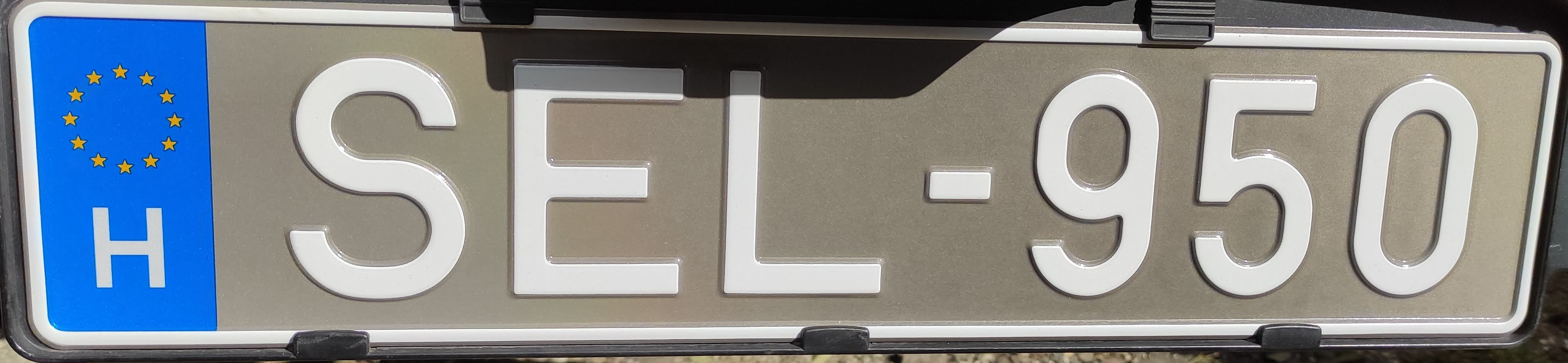
Bike rack repeater plate

Ordinary plates carry six characters, three letters and three numbers (except for personalised plates).

- Since May 2004, all plates are issued with a blue EU stripe on the left side instead of the Hungarian tricolor (old plates still valid).
- Validation stickers were used on the rear plate, below and above the hyphen from 1999, but they are no longer in use since January 2016.
- Every vehicle has to have a validation sticker at the bottom right corner of the windscreen. It contains the plate number of the vehicle and a bar code. Its usefulness is highly questionable.

==== Normal series ====
The plate consists of three letters and three numbers (form 001 to 999), separated with a hyphen. It has a reflective white background, black frame and black characters. The series are given out in alphabetical order, so the approximate age of the license plate (and sometimes of the car, if it was registered for the first time) can be determined.

First letter	First issued in	Notes
A	1990	
B	1991	BPI and BPO are reserved for Budapesti Közlekedési Zrt (BKV) buses
C	1991	
D	1992	
E	1993	From EAA to EDZ (Taxis, yellow plates)
F	1994	From FIA to FZZ (cargo carriers, yellow plates)
G	1996	
H	1999	
I	2001	
J	Dec 2003	EU stripe from JDA-001
K	Dec 2005	
L	Nov 2007	
M	Dec 2011	
N	Dec 2014	
P	Dec 2016	
R	Jul 2018	
S	Jan 2020	Green S plates: Dec 2019
T	Oct 2021	Last plate issued is THW-647

- Note, that the series starting with ‘O’ is not given out as it can be confused with 0. For similar reasons ‘I’ and ‘O’ cannot be the last letter (the last one given out in normal series was ACO and ACI), ‘Q’ cannot be used at all (last one within the normal series was AWQ). This rule is also valid for commercial, taxi, trailer and motorcycle plates. Nevertheless, ‘I’, 'O’ and ‘Q’ can be at any position in case of personalised plates.
- Personalised plates can be bought in the format of three letter-three number (~€350 ) and four letter-two number or five letter-one number (~€1300 ). Plates are linked to the buyer and may be transferred to a new vehicle. Offensive or misleading texts are not allowed.
- Since October, 2015 it is possible to ask for green backgrounded plates for plug-in hybrids and electric cars which meet certain criteria. Owners of these cars enjoy some benefits (e.g.: free parking in Budapest and some other cities). Usually certain letter combinations are dedicated from the normal series which are all green plates from 001 to 999. These letter combinations are: NLE, NNB, PAV, PDA, PMY, PPZ, PUL, PXA, PYA, REW, RIA, RKZ, RMY, RMZ, RNY, RPZ, RVZ, RZZ, SAA, SAB, SDZ, SEA, SEZ, SFZ, SHA, SIZ, SJZ, SMZ, SNY, SNZ, SPY, SRA, SRZ, SSA, STZ, SUZ, SVZ, SXA, SXZ, SYS, SZX, TAA, TBA, TBZ, TCA, TCZ, TDZ, TEA, TEB, TEZ, TFA, TFB, and TGJ. White plates from the normal series can be requested to be remade as a green plate, if the car meets the requirements.
- In April, 2017 grey plates were introduced. The plate is identical with the car's original plates, but the background color is gray and with EU stripe in all cases. The aim was to create a 3rd plate for bike rack users, as the law did not allow the rear plate to be moved to the bike rack. The process of getting a grey plate was quite complicated and expensive, thus the system was simplified just after 2 months of its introduction. Since June 2017 the rear plate can be transferred to the bike rack, which makes grey plates practically unnecessary, can be still requested though.

==== Taxi and commercial ====
The system is similar to the normal series, but the background colour is yellow. Taxi plates are ranging from EAA to EDZ. Sometimes plates from the normal series are remade as a yellow taxi plate. Commercial plates are ranging from FIA to FZZ. Changing normal white plate to yellow commercial could be requested before 2004 (yellow plates with for instance G, H or I first letters often occur). Since 2008 yellow plates are not a requirement for trucks and buses, new yellow plates starting with 'F' are rare nowadays.

==== Motorcycle ====
Similar to normal plates, but small size and two-line format is used. Also consisting of three letters and three numbers, but without a hyphen and the first letter is ‘U’. Some cars can have plates from the ‘U’ series, where there is only room for motorcycle-sized plates both on the front and the back (typically American cars).

==== Trailer ====
Same format as the normal series, but the first letter is X (all combinations were used up in 2014) or W (used until 2022).

==== Special plates ====
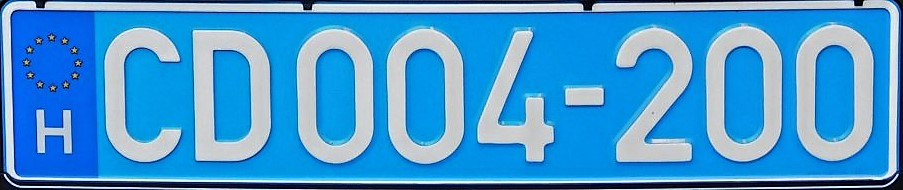
Diplomatic plate, 004 denotes Germany

Old timer plate

Military plate

Customs plate

Ambulance plate

Motorsport vehicles plate

The common format for special plates is mostly two letters followed by two numbers and two numbers, separated with a hyphen.

==== Diplomatic ====
Since May 2017 diplomatic corps plates carry the letters CD and six numbers, separated with a hyphen. The plate has white characters on light blue background. First three numbers are matched to countries, numbers are arranged in chronological order of the first diplomatic contact with each country. 001 belongs to Vatican City, 020 belongs to the United States. The complete code list is not known yet. Last three numbers are in connection with the diplomatic person's working position (ambassador, consul, embassy staff, etc.). Before 2017 plates starting with CD were for diplomats, who are leaving the country permanently, valid for 30 days. This plate has black letters (2 letters, 4 numbers) on white background, and the Hungarian tricolor on the left, still issued.

==== Old timer vehicles ====
For antique cars plate starts with OT, followed by four numerals. There is no EU version of this plate. The vehicle has to be at least 30 years old, still has its original technical specifications.

==== Military ====
Military plates start with H followed by one letter and four numbers. Mostly tricolor plates, with some euroband exceptions. Letters seen in use: A (cars), B (buses, minibuses), E, F (minibuses), I, K (minibuses, jeeps), M, N (motorcycles), P, R, S (military ambulance), T (trucks), V, X (trailers).

==== U.S. Forces in Hungary plates (Pápa Air Base) ====
The U.S. military presence in Hungary is centered primarily around Pápa Air Base, which supports NATO operations and hosts units like the Heavy Airlift Wing (HAW). Vehicles used by U.S. military personnel stationed there before 2017 were similar to vehicle registration plates of the United States Army in Germany. Plates for Pápa Air Base U.S. military personnel began with "CDA" and were sequentially numbered with the NATO insignia above the USA country code on a blue background. In around 2017, those service members having these distinctive USA plates on their private vehicles shifted to regular Hungarian plates.

Currently, U.S. military personnel stationed in Pápa use ordinary Hungarian plates. Often, service members who have shipped a car as part of their relocation (Permanent Change of Station or PCS) household goods allowance will keep their American plates for the duration of their stay in Pápa while others will register the car with ordinary Hungarian plates, sometimes needing a different shape to accommodate the size difference between U.S. and European license plantes.

There are some distinctive Hungarian military plates at the Pápa Air Base. These special military plates typically follow this format:

- “HAW” + 3 digits

Example: HAW-123 - HAW standing for Heavy Airlift Wing, the NATO unit operating out of Pápa.

These plates usually appear with white background and black characters, similar to standard Hungarian plates but without the EU blue band and sometimes feature a small NATO flag or base-related sticker for identification purposes on the windshield rather than the plate itself.

12 nations are part of the Heavy Airlift Wing and personnel from several other countries support the program. Other than the United States, these nations are all in Europe, so personnel and their families often drive their vehicles from their home countries to use in Pápa for several years without registering them in Hungary. All of these countries' license plates can be seen around Pápa as well as Hungarian diplomatic plates for NATO support staff.

==== Police and customs ====
It starts with R, next to one letter and four numerals. Most common for police is RB, but nowadays plates from the normal series are generally used. Letters seen in use: A (cars), B (cars), F (trucks), K (motorcycles). RR 00–01 to 49-99 is used by law enforcement and RR 50–00 to 99-99 is used by National Tax and Customs Administration.

==== Ambulance ====
Ambulance vehicles’ plates start with MA, then four numbers. This type was introduced in 2006, before that normal plates were in use.

==== Motorsport ====
Vehicles used for motorsport purposes can ask for SP plates since October, 2012. The format is same as the others above. No euroband version. This plate cannot be used to drive in regular traffic on an everyday basis. SP plates will be replaced with general temporary I plates according to an Ordinance, accepted in 2019. Date of introduction was moved from Jan, 2021 to Jul, 2022.

==== Others ====
- Mopeds have license plate since 2014, starts with S, followed by three letters and two numbers.
- Agricultural vehicles plates start with M, then six numerals. Characters are green on white background, no europlate version. Expires after 3 years and cannot be renewed. May only be used in Hungary.
- Slow vehicles plate has the same style as the normal series, but starts with ‘Y’ and the characters are red on white background.

According to an Ordinance, accepted in 2019, plates from the normal series will be issued instead of 'Y' plates. 'M' plates will be replaced by 'I', general temporary plates. Date of introduction was moved from January 2021 to July 2022.

==== Temporary plates ====
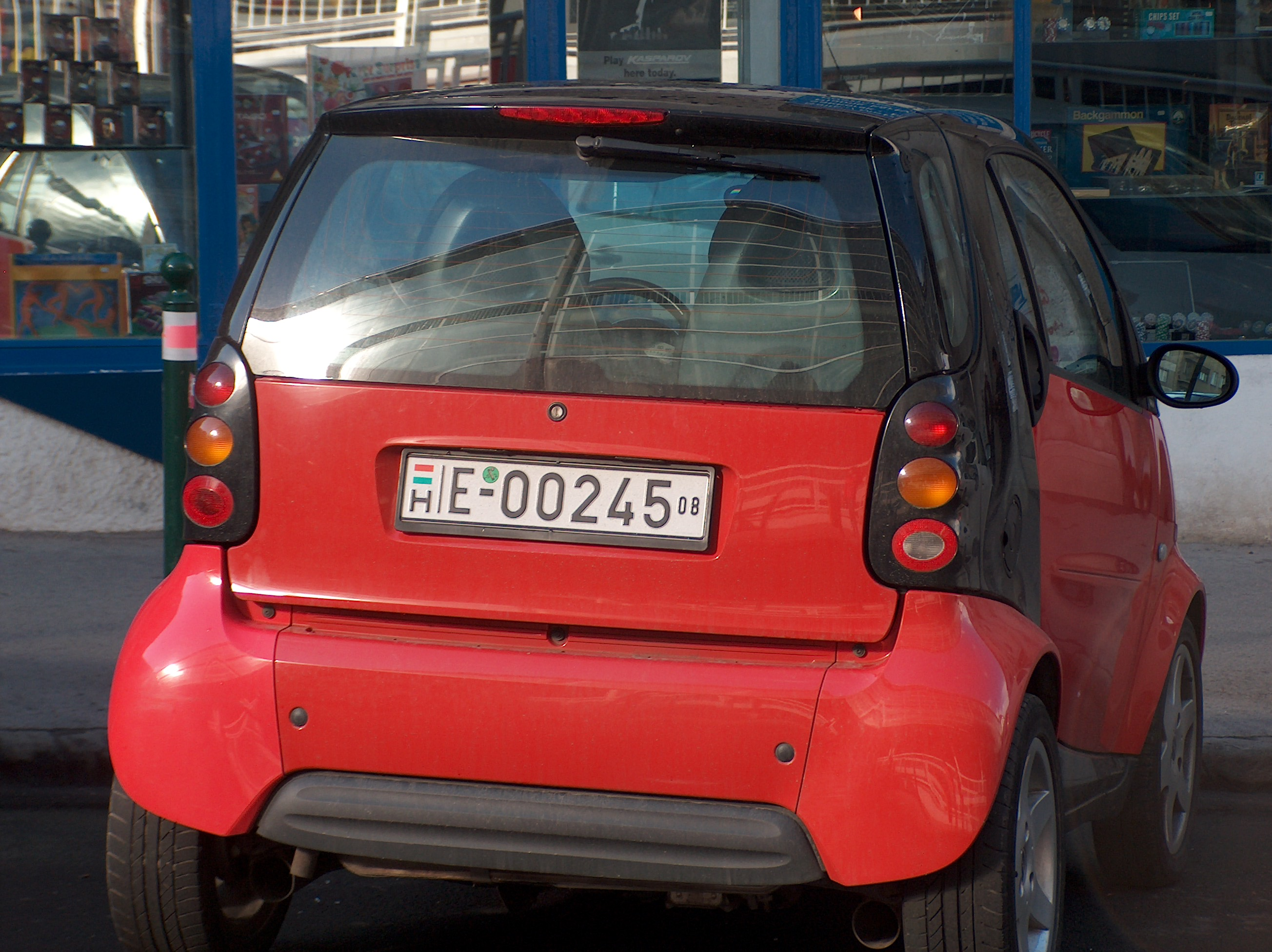
E plate on a Smart Fortwo (issued in 2008)

The format is one letter and five numbers, separated with a hyphen. On the right side two small numbers are indicating the year of issue (E, P, Z plates) or the year when it is valid (V plates). For instance, 16 means 2016. No EU version of these plates. E, P and Z plates will be replaced with general I plate according to a new Ordinance, accepted in 2019. V plates will be ceased. Date of introduction was moved from Jan, 2021 to Jul, 2022.

- Common temporary plates start with E. Maximum valid for 180 days, date is indicated in the car's registration and may only be used in Hungary.
- Car under customs process begins with V.
- Export plates start with Z. Valid for 30 days, date is indicated in the car's registration.
- Trial or experimental plates start with P. Usually used by car dealers. May carry only one person unless otherwise authorised.

==== Others ====
Rent-a-car plate (no longer in use)

- Rental cars used to have the format X followed by one letter and four numerals, but no longer used since July 2004.
- Foreign residents have the plate C followed by one letter and four numbers. Not issued since April 2009, however the ones already given out are still valid.
- Honorary consuls used to have HC plates but were withdrawn in 2003.
- Diplomats, consuls and their families who are enjoying immunity according to international treaties had plates starting with DT, followed by four numbers. This plate had white characters on dark blue background (light blue on the 1990-2004 style). Plates starting with CK, followed by four numbers were given out to non-Hungarian embassy staff. This had red characters on white background. The first two numbers were connected to the country. Some examples: 00/01 – United States, 02 – United Kingdom, 04 – Germany, 05 – France, 06 – Italy. DT and CK plates were not issued after May 2017 and were valid until the end of the same year.

== Gallery ==
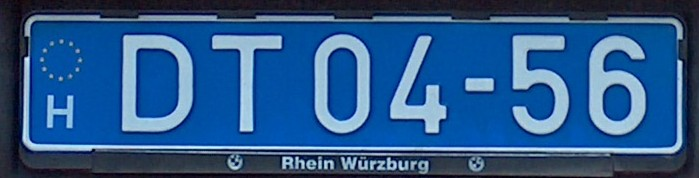
Diplomatic (1990–2017) 04–Germany

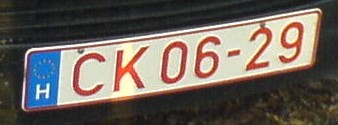
Embassy staff (1990–2017) 06–Italy

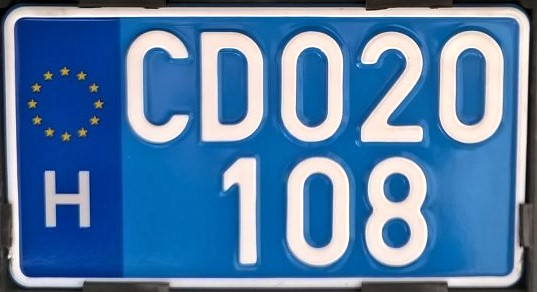
Diplomatic corps (2017–) 020–United States

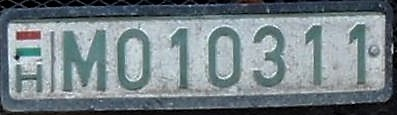
Agricultural vehicles

Car dealer/trial/experimental vehicles (2016)

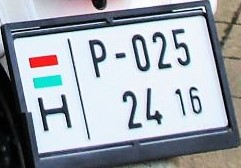
Car dealer/trial/experimental vehicles (2016, US-size)

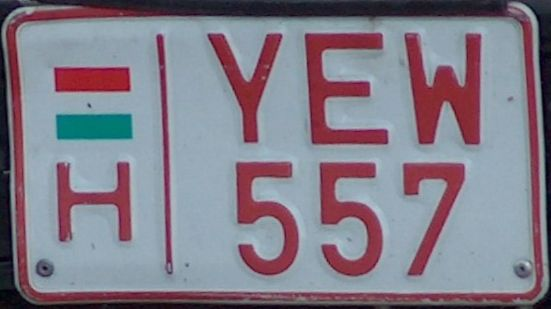
Slow vehicle plate

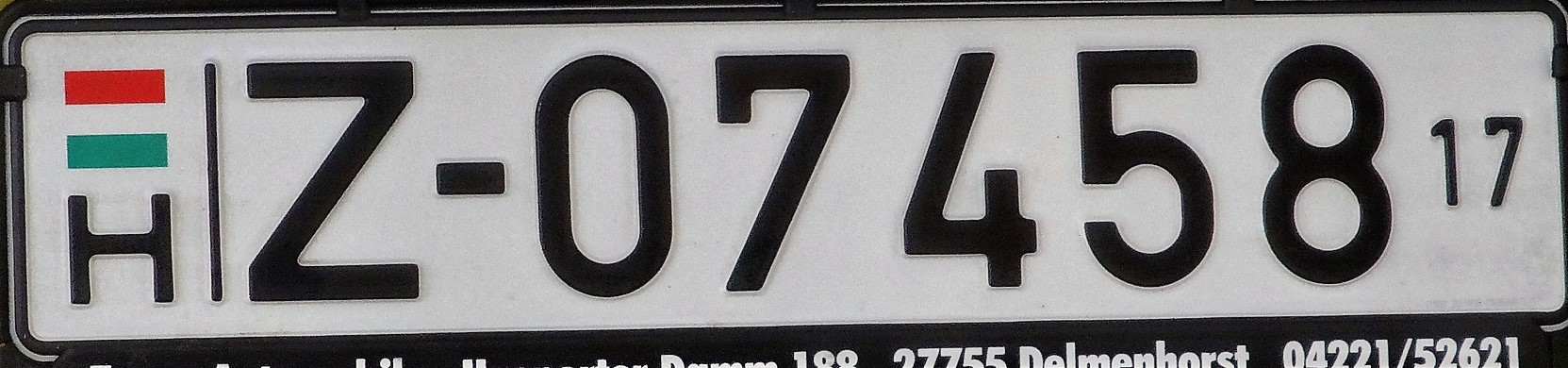
Export plate (2017)

Foreign residents plate (no longer issued since 2009)

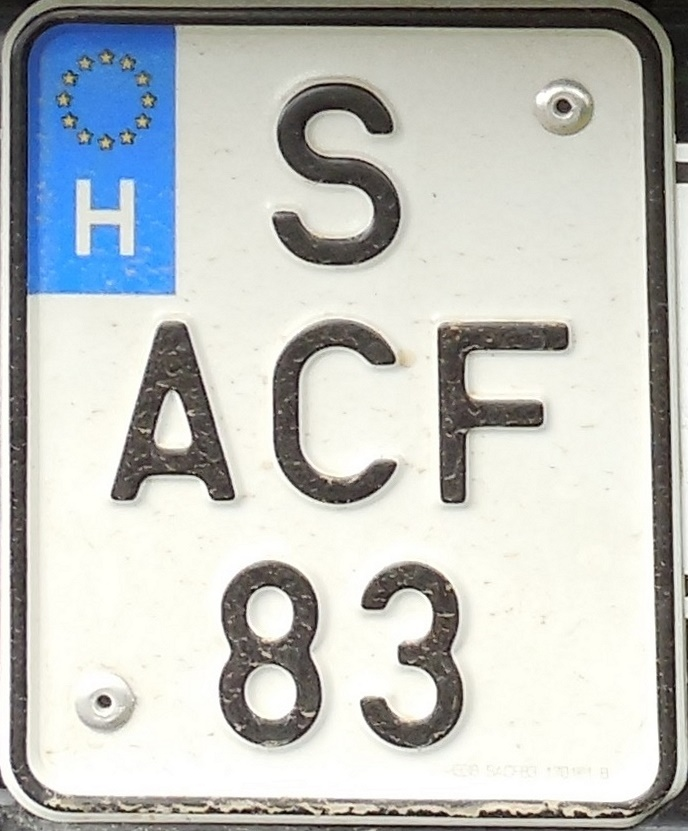
Moped plate

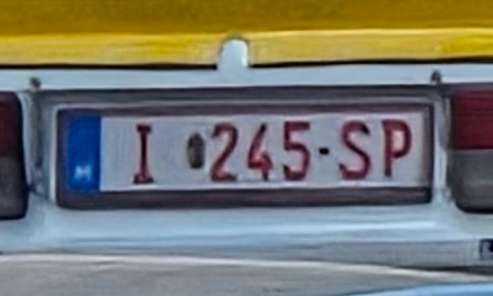
New sporting plate
