= NSPA =

NSPA may refer to:

- National Scholastic Press Association
- NATO Support and Procurement Agency

== Political parties ==
- National Socialist Party of America
- National Socialist Party of Australia
