= Heinkel HD 22 =

HD 22
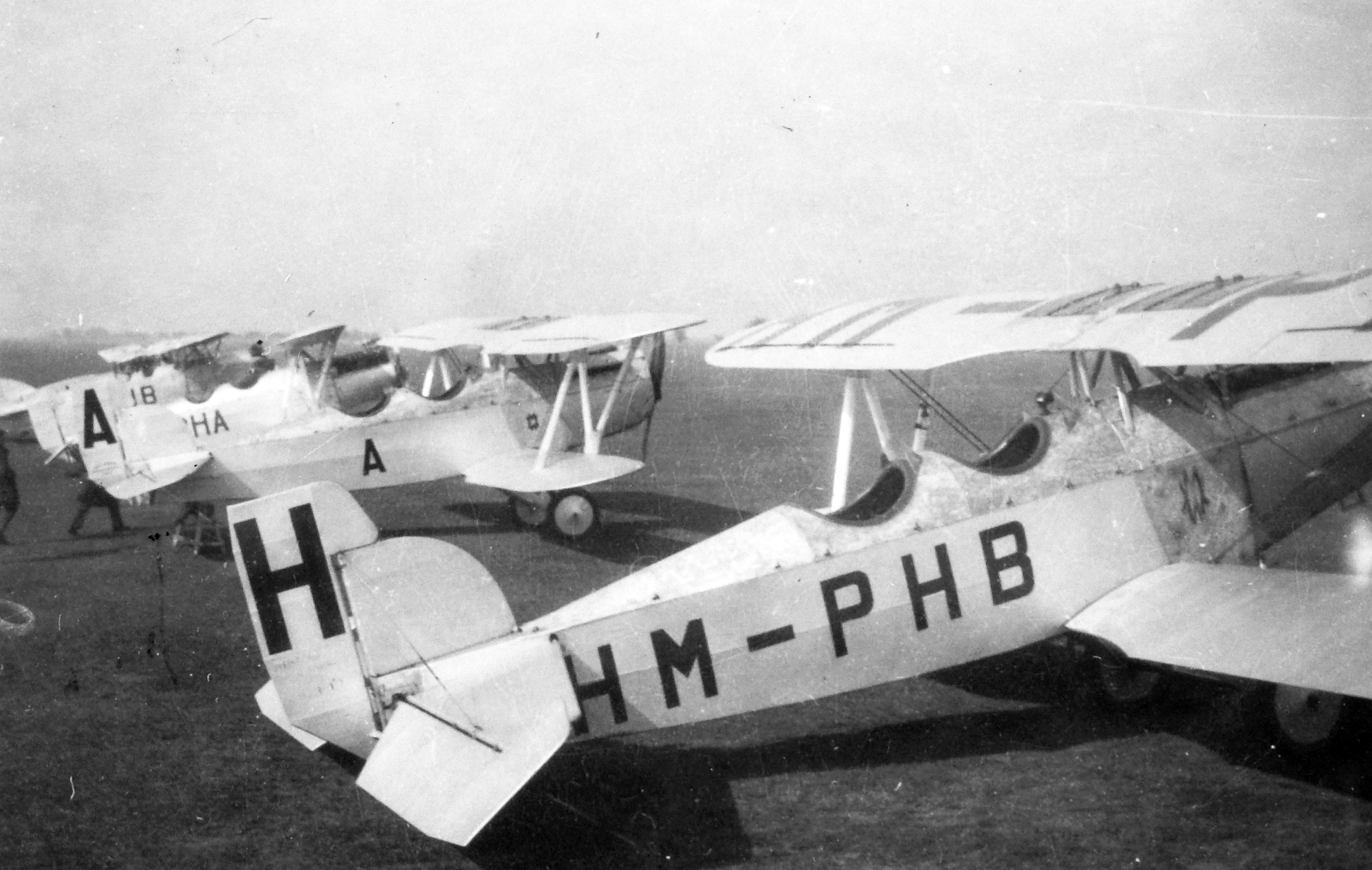
- Hungarian HD-22s in 1933

General information
- Type: Civil trainer
- National origin: Germany
- Manufacturer: Heinkel, Manfred Weiss
- Primary users: Hungarian Air Force U.S. Army Air Corps

History
- First flight: 1926

The Heinkel HD 22 was a trainer designed in Germany during the 1920s. It was a conventional single-bay biplane with staggered wings braced with N-type interplane struts. The pilot and instructor sat in tandem, open cockpits, and the main units of the fixed, tailskid undercarriage were linked by a cross-axle.

The main producer of the type was Manfred Weiss in Hungary, which built the design to equip the Hungarian Air Force, which was at that time masquerading as civil flying clubs. Around 30 aircraft were purchased, making this the most significant user of the type.

One HD 22 was purchased by the US Army Air Corps for use by the US military attaché in Germany.

== Operators ==
Hungary

- Hungarian Air Force

United States

- United States Army Air Corps

== Specifications ==
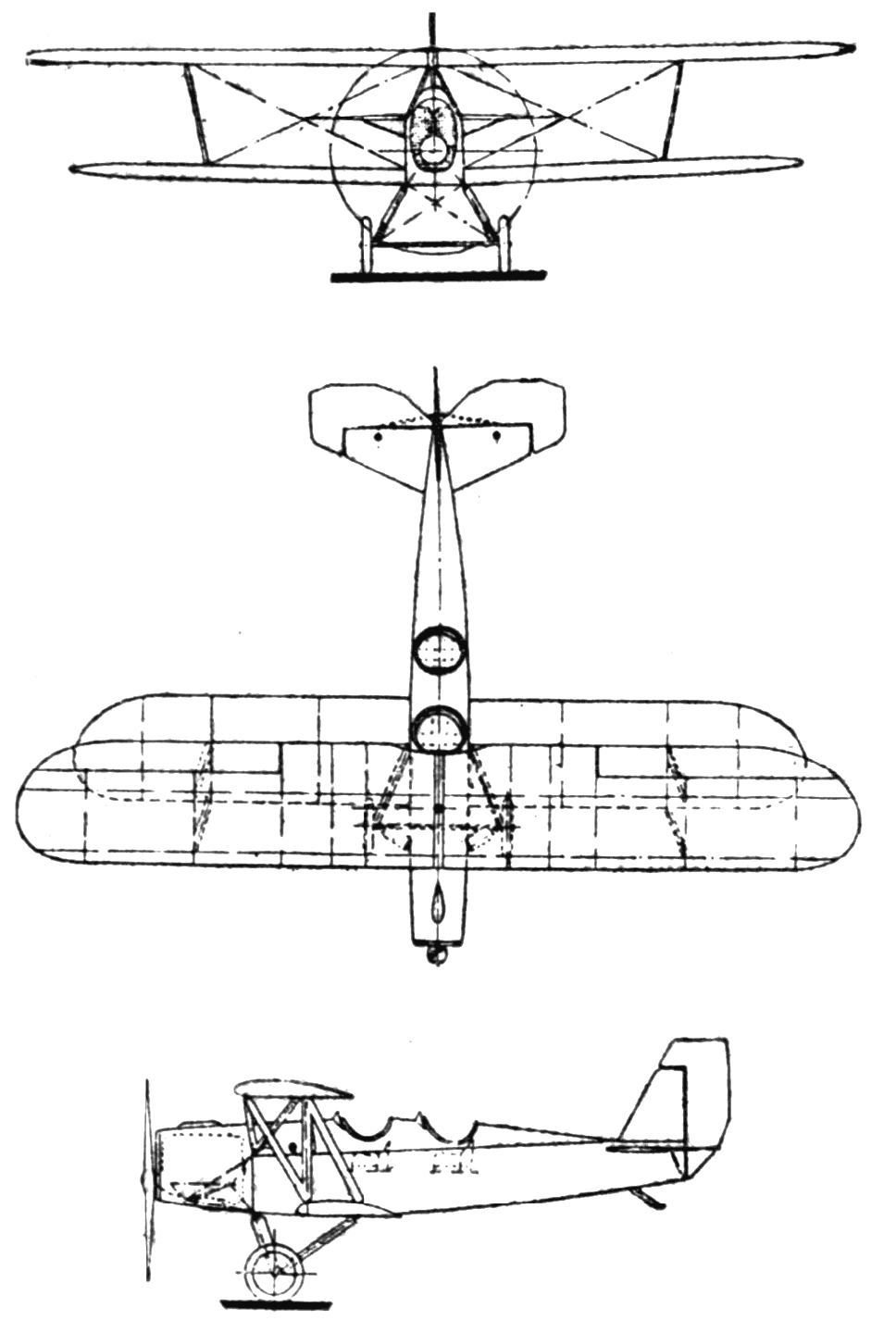
Heinkel HD 22 3-view drawing from Le Document aéronautique January,1927

Data from Jane's all the World's Aircraft 1928.

General characteristics

- Crew: 2
- Length: 8.3 m (27 ft 3 in)
- Upper wingspan: 12 m (39 ft 4 in)
- Lower wingspan: 10.4 m (34 ft 1 in)
- Wing area: 34.8 m^{2} (375 sq ft)
- Empty weight: 1,200 kg (2,646 lb)
- Gross weight: 1,700 kg (3,748 lb)
- Fuel capacity: 400 L (110 US gal; 88 imp gal)
- Powerplant: 1 × BMW IV 6-cylinder water-cooled in-line piston engine, 170 kW (230 hp)
- Propellers: 2-bladed fixed pitch propeller

Performance

- Maximum speed: 204 km/h (127 mph, 110 kn)
- Landing speed: 86 km/h (53 mph; 46 kn)
- Service ceiling: 6,000 m (20,000 ft)
- Rate of climb: 4.5 m/s (890 ft/min)
- Wing loading: 48.8 kg/m^{2} (10.0 lb/sq ft)
- Power/mass: 0.1236 kW/kg (0.0752 hp/lb)

== See also ==
Related lists

- List of military aircraft of the United States
