= Hungarian Air Force =

Air warfare branch of Hungary's military

- Magyar Légierő
- Emblem of the Hungarian Air Force
- Founded: 1914; 112 years ago
- Country: Hungary
- Type: Air force
- Role: Aerial warfare
- Size: 5,750 active duty personnel 74 aircraft
- Part of: Hungarian Defence Forces
- Headquarters: Budapest
- Anniversaries: 15 August

Commanders
- Current commander: Major General Nándor Kilián

Insignia
- Roundel

Aircraft flown
- Fighter: JAS 39 Gripen
- Helicopter: Airbus H225M, Airbus H145M
- Trainer: Zlín Z 42, Airbus H125, L-39 Skyfox
- Transport: Airbus A319, Dassault Falcon 7X, Embraer KC-390

The Hungarian Air Force (Hungarian: Magyar Légierő, Hungarian pronunciation: [ˈmɒɟɒr ˈleːgijɛrøː]) is the air force branch of the Hungarian Defence Forces.

The primary focus of the present Hungarian Air Force lies in defensive operations. The flying units operate are organised into a single command; under the Air Command and Control Centre.

== History ==
=== 1918 to pre–World War II ===
Following the dissolution of the Austro-Hungarian Monarchy in 1918, a small air arm was established, operating surviving aircraft from Hungarian factories and training schools. This air arm became the Hungarian Red Air Force under the short-lived Hungarian Soviet Republic, but was disbanded upon its downfall.

=== World War II ===
Under the Treaty of Trianon (1920), Hungary was forbidden from owning military aircraft. However, a secret air arm was gradually established under the cover of civilian flying clubs. During 1938, as a result of the Bled agreement, the existence of the Royal Hungarian Air Force (Hungarian: Magyar Királyi Honvéd Légierő (MKHL) lit. "Royal Hungarian Home Guard Air Force"), was made known. The army's aviation service was reorganised and expanded.

In late 1938, the army aviation was once again reorganised. Admiral Horthy, the head of state, ordered that the army aviation should become an independent service effective 9 January 1939. Colonel Ferenc Feketehalmi Czeydner became the Air Section Chief in the Honvéd Ministry; Major General Waldemar Kenese became Inspector of the Air Force; Colonel Ferenc Szentnémedy became Chief-of-Staff, and Colonel László Háry was appointed head of the Magyar Királyi Honvéd Légierő (MKHL).

It subsequently participated in clashes with the newly established Slovak Republic and in the border confrontation with the Kingdom of Romania. In April 1941, operations were conducted in support of the German invasion of Yugoslavia and, on 27 June 1941, Hungary declared war on the Soviet Union.

In 1940, the decision was made to unite the Air Force, the anti-aircraft forces, and the civilian air defense organizations under one central headquarters. Colonel László Háry was retired 24 December 1940, and on 1 March 1941 the new organization was constituted. General András Littay became Air Sub-Department Chief, and Colonel Géza Vörös was appointed Head of the Air General Staff. On 1 June 1941, the Air Defense Corps was established, and Lieutenant General Béla Rákosi became Commander of Army Aviation. In effect the Air Force had once again become part of the Army.

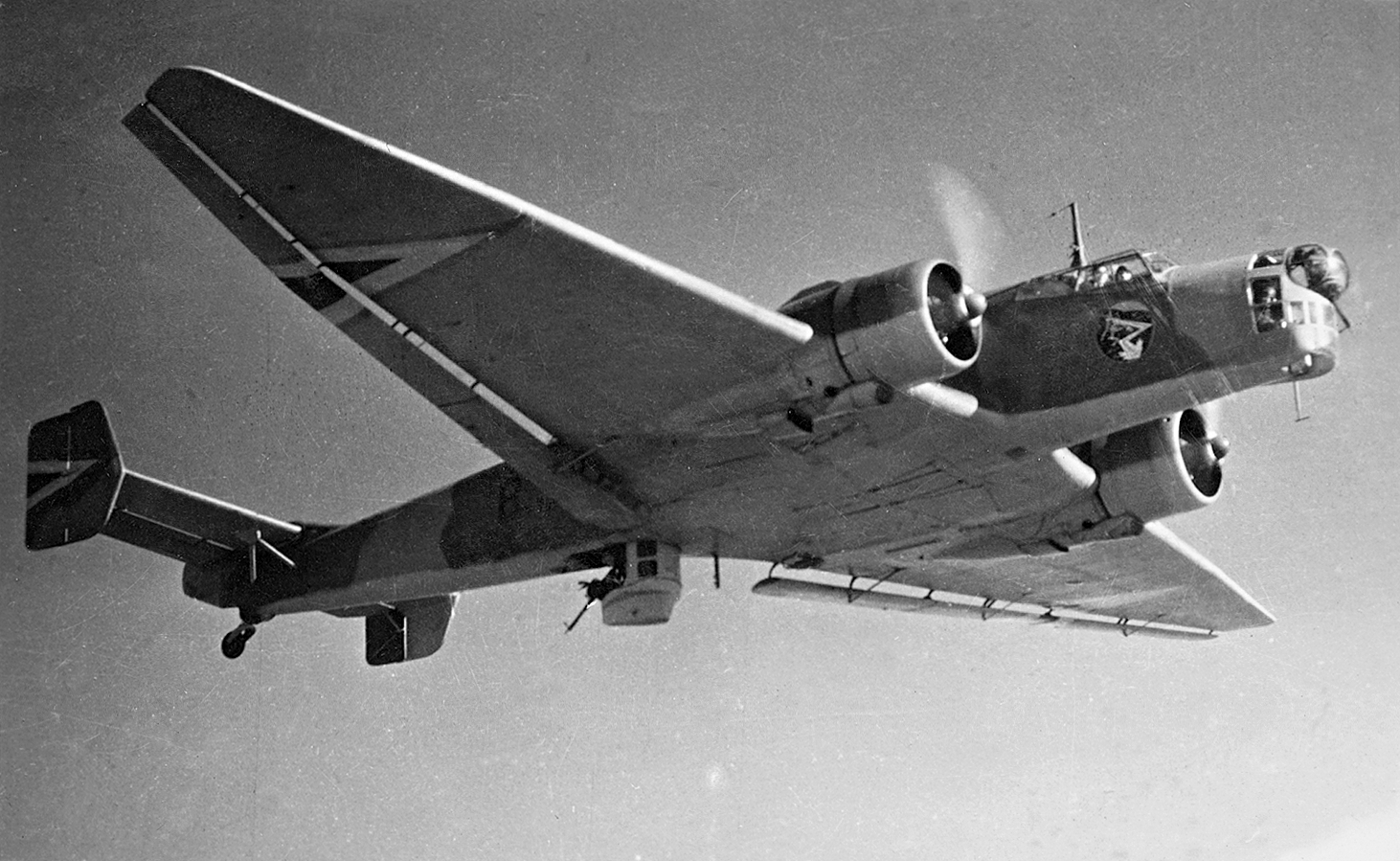
A Royal Hungarian Air Force Junkers Ju 86 1942

In the summer of 1942, an air brigade was attached to the Luftwaffe's VIII. Fliegerkorps on the Eastern Front. Beginning March 1944, Allied bomber raids began on Hungary and progressively increased in intensity. The 101st "Puma" fighter group (later wing) was the elite unit of the MKHL (its name and insignia are carried on by the "Puma" fighter squadron of the Hungarian Air Force of today). Late in 1944 all efforts were redirected towards countering the advancing Red Army, but to no avail. All fighting in Hungary ended on 16 April 1945.

=== Post–World War II to present ===
A small air arm was organised along Soviet lines during 1947. Following the communist takeover, Soviet military aid was stepped up and a major expansion program initiated. By 1956 the Hungarian Air Force consisted of the 25th Fighter Division (25. Vadászrepülő Hadosztály, HQ in Taszár), the 66th Fighter Division (66. Vadaszrepülő Hadosztály, HQ in Kecskemét), the 82nd Separate Bomber Division (82. Önálló Bombázó Hadosztály, HQ in Kunmadaras), the 28th Ground Attack Division (28. Csatarepülő Hadosztály, HQ in Székesfehérvár) and a training air division. When Soviet forces invaded to suppress the Hungarian Revolution of 1956, sections of the Hungarian Air Force attacked Soviet forces and resisted Russian attempts to occupy their bases. The resistance was short-lived and the entire Hungarian air force was demobilized soon after. A reconstituted air arm was reformed in the following year as part of the Hungarian People's Army, but initially only as an internal security force. The remaining Hungarian air force assets were organised in the Aircraft Training Center (Repülő Kiképző Központ (RKK)) on 1 April 1957, with one mixed aircraft types squadron each at the main fighter air bases at Pápa, Taszár and Kecskemét. Gradually, starting in 1959 as Hungary became stable, the air force was expanded again, but it remained an integral part of the army and was essentially a defensive force.

During the Cold War period communist Hungary had numerous SA-2, SA-3 and also SA-5 (one unit) batteries and a large number of radar installations, mostly tasked with defending the Danube line against NATO air strikes. Army air defense was equipped with the SA-4, SA-6 Kub and SA-9, SA-13 systems besides conventional AAA units.

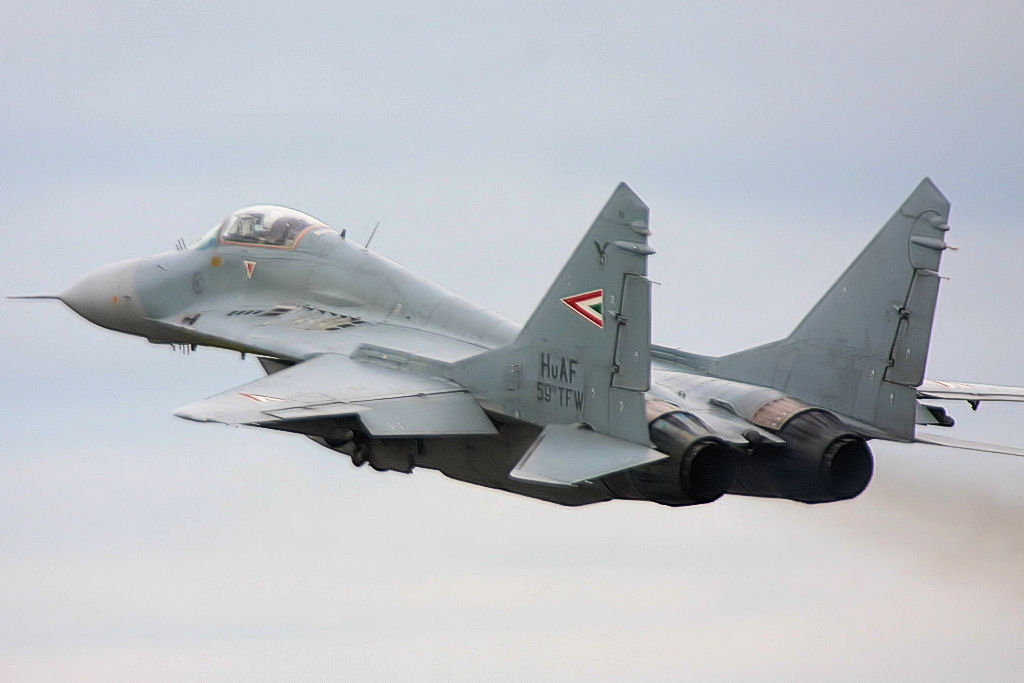
A Hungarian MiG-29 over RIAT 2008

The Hungarian People's Army Air Force operated the Yak-9, Tu-2, Il-10, Il-28, MiG-15, MiG-17, MiG-19, MiG-21, MiG-23 and Su-22 combat aircraft during its existence. In the 1980s it had three fighter regiments (wings) at the three main bases with three squadrons each, with a total of approximately 100 active supersonic fighter aircraft. From 1989 the force was downsized several times until the early 2000s when only one active fighter squadron was remaining with often only 2–4 flyable alert ready aircraft at a given time.

In mid-1993, three batches of 28 MiG-29s were delivered from Russia as a payment in kind of government debt. They were based at Kecskemét. In 1995, a German gift of 20 Mi-24D/V's arrived.

For most other former Warsaw Pact member countries, pilot training was not a big deal. Each nation maintained an independent aviation technical college, an academy for training military aircraft pilots, and technical personnel. After the Second World War, Hungary created György Kilián Aviation Technical College in 1949, but in the 1960s domestic pilot training was discontinued and the 18 then modern Aero L-29 Delfin jet trainers were handed over to the Soviet Union. The training of pilots was conducted in several schools and bases in the USSR in the following years, and also in Czechoslovakia, in Košice. In Hungary, only helicopter pilots and technicians were trained at Szolnok.

In 1993, Hungary commenced its first pilot training course since 1956 at the Szolnok Aviation Academy. For this, 12 Yak-52 primary trainers were purchased from Romania. The German Government also donated 24 Aero L-39 Albatros jet trainers. The cost of domestic pilot training was later deemed too high after a change of government, and was halted after the completion of only one course. Also in 1997 the MIG-23s and Su-22s were withdrawn from service, the later type was retired just after an overhaul. During the 1990s all combat aircraft were fitted with new Identification Friend or Foe (IFF) systems to enable operations in Western airspace. In April 2002, Hungary joined the NATO Flying Training in Canada (NFTC) pilot training program.

Shortly after Hungary joined NATO in 1999, a push was made to replace the Air Force's MiG-29 fleet with a NATO-compatible fighter force. By 2001, several offers had been received, a Swedish offer with 24 JAS 39C/D, the USA offered 24 used F-16's and multiple other offers had been received for the commissioning of various used aircraft. Despite the fact that the professional committees favored the F-16, on 10 September 2001, the Swedish bid won, and on 20 December Hungary signed a contract with the Swedish Government. The contract included leasing 14 JAS 39 Gripens, two of which are two-seaters, for 12 years beginning in 2006 (later extended until 2026). By December 2007 all 14 jets had been delivered. After the lease period expires in 2026, Hungary will own the remaining Gripens. On 23 February 2024, alongside the delivery of four additional Gripens of the same type, a further support and logistics contract for these aircraft was extended until 2036.

A large-scale modernization program was launched in 2016 under the name "Zrinyi 2026". Its first significant step was the order of 36 Airbus helicopters in 2018. 20 H145M was ordered for light utility, SAR, and light attack roles. Later that year 16 H225M helicopters were ordered for heavy transport and SOF roles. All 20 H145Ms were delivered by the end of 2021.

In June 2020, the last plane from the Antonov An-26 fleet was retired from service, temporarily leaving the Hungarian Air Force without tactical airlift capability. Two KC-390 were ordered to fill this role in late 2020. The first aircraft is to arrive in 2023, the second in 2024.

The ground-based air defence arm also got a big boost in 2020 by ordering of the NASAMS missile system and the 11 ELM-2084 radars. The Mistral short range air defence system was also modernized.

As part of the modernization program, the Hungarian Air Force became interested in obtaining new advanced training aircraft. The Air Force performed evaluation flights of the L-39 Skyfox during Aero Vodochody's visit on 17 November 2021. In April 2022, Hungarian officials and Aero jointly announced that Hungary has signed an agreement to purchase 12 L-39 Skyfoxes, expected to be delivered in 2024.

In August 2021, a contract was signed with SAAB to modernize the Gripen fleet, to include an improved PS-05/A Mk4 radar and new armament. After implementing the MS20 Block 2 software upgrade, the Hungarian Gripens would be able to launch Meteor, IRIS-T missiles, and GBU-49 bombs. All of these weapons are under procurement as of 2022.

The Hungarian Air Force plans to keep its upgraded Gripen fleet well into the 2030s and even acquire enough fighters for a second fighter squadron. 5th generation aircraft like the F-35 are too expensive, and their advanced capabilities are not necessary for the defense needs of Hungary. Airstrike capability (where stealth has a great advantage) is not a priority for the Hungarian Air Force, and no potential foe has stealth fighters in the region. Most likely, the Hungarian Air Force will skip on the 5th generation of fighter aircraft and plans to participate in one of the European fighter development projects in one way or another.

== Structure ==
Hungarian Air Force locations 2025:
JAS 39C/D Gripen Helicopters other flying units
Air Defence Missile unit Command & Control Center RAT-31DL radar
other sites

The following units are part of the Hungarian Air Force, but, like all other operational units of the Hungarian Defence Forces, fall under operational control of the Joint Forces Operations Command in Székesfehérvár:

- Joint Forces Operations Command, in Székesfehérvár
  - Air Operations Command and Control Center, in Veszprém
    - Air Operations Center, in Veszprém
      - Operations Shift
      - Air Operations Planning Group
      - Airlift Group
      - Military Air Traffic Management Group
    - Air Traffic Control Center, in Veszprém
      - Operations Shift
      - Meteorological Center
      - Operations Support Meteorological Center, in Budapest
      - Operations Training Group
      - Training and Reserve Command Center, at Kecskemét Air Base
    - Air Reconnaissance Center
    - 11th Radar Company, in Kup
    - 12th Radar Company, in Juta
    - Radar Measuring Point, in Békéscsaba; with RAT-31DL
    - Radar Measuring Point, in Medina; with RAT-31DL
    - Radar Measuring Point, in Bánkút; with RAT-31DL
    - Information Technology Center
    - Regional CBRN Monitoring Center
    - Signals Battalion
    - Support Battalion
  - 47th Air Base, at Pápa Air Base
    - Air Base Operations Battalion
    - NATO Heavy Airlift Wing (NATO Strategic Airlift Capability); with 3x C-17 Globemaster III
      - Air Base Operations and Maintenance Company
      - Aviation Support Squadron
      - Ground Flight Control Service Platoon
      - Firefighting and CBRN-Defence Platoon
      - Air Traffic Control Center
      - Meteorological Group
      - Passenger Terminal Operating and Loading Section
    - Support Battalion
      - Guard and Military Police Company
      - Human Resources Support Office
      - CBRN-Defence Section
      - Search and Rescue Section
      - National Training Reception and Preparation Support Group
    - Base Operations Battalion
      - Logistics Squadron
      - Warehouses
  - 86th Helicopter Brigade "József Kiss", at Szolnok Air Base
    - Base Operations Center
    - Combat Helicopter Battalion; with Mi-24V/P attack helicopters (being replaced with armed H145M helicopters)
    - Transport Helicopter Battalion; with H225M helicopters
    - Special Air Operations Squadron; with H145M and H225M helicopters
    - Operations Support Battalion
    - Aviation Maintenance Battalion
    - Logistics Battalion
  - 101st Aviation Brigade "Dezső Szentgyörgyi", at Kecskemét Air Base
    - Base Operations Center
    - Tactical Fighter Squadron; with 12× JAS 39C Gripen and 2× JAS 39D Gripen (4× additional JAS 39C Gripen on order)
    - Transport Aircraft Squadron; with 2× Airbus A319, 2× Dassault Falcon 7X, 1× Embraer KC-390 (1× additional KC-390 on order)
    - Tactical Training Squadron; with 6× Zlin Z–242L, 2× Zlín Z–143LSi, 3× L-39 Skyfox (9× more on order) trainer aircraft)
    - Air Combat and Operations Support Battalion
    - Operations Support Battalion
    - Aviation Maintenance Battalion
    - Logistics Battalion
  - 205th Air Defence Missile Regiment "Tibor Dánielfy", in Győr
    - Air Defence Missile and Operations Center
    - 1st Air Defence Missile Battalion, in Isaszeg; with NASAMS 3 surface-to-air missile systems
    - 2nd Air Defence Missile Battalion; with Mistral short range air defence systems
    - Logistic Battalion
    - Weapons Training and Simulation Center

The Hungarian Air Force Aircraft Repair Facility at Kecskemét Air Base falls under the Hungarian Defense Forces Logistics Center in Budapest.

=== Aircraft armament ===
Type	Origin	Role	Aircraft	Quantity	Note
Thales FZ231	Belgium	70 mm rocket pod	H145M	5 pcs	
Nexter NC621	France	20 mm cannon pod	H145M	5 pcs	
IRIS-T	Germany	Short range Air-to-Air Missile	JAS 39 Gripen	N.A.	Hungary ordered unknown number of IRIS-T missiles in late 2021 for 13.6 million EUR. More to be purchased later.
AIM-9M Sidewinder	United States	Short range Air-to-Air Missile	JAS 39 Gripen	N.A.	
AIM-9L Sidewinder	United States	Short range Air-to-Air Missile	JAS 39 Gripen	N.A.	
AIM-120 AMRAAM	United States	Medium range Air-to-Air Missile	JAS 39 Gripen	40 AIM-120C-5 120 AIM-120C-7	In 2004 40 AIM-120C-5 missiles were purchased along with 10 CATM-120 training missiles for a total of 25,389,904 USD. In 2020 180 AIM-120C-7 missiles were purchased for both the Gripen fleet and the NASAMS 3 launchers of the air defence forces.
AGM-65 Maverick	United States	Guided Air-to-Ground Missile	JAS 39 Gripen	20 pcs AGM-65G 20 pcs AGM-65H	
GBU-12	United States	Laser guided aerial bomb	JAS 39 Gripen	N.A.	
Mk-82	United States	Unguided aerial bomb	JAS 39 Gripen	N.A.	

Meteor air-to-air missiles and GBU-49 guided bombs are planned to be purchased for the Gripen fleet.

=== Air defence assets ===
Name	Origin	Type	In service	Notes
SAM systems and radars
Mistral	France	SAM system	45 launchers + 9 MCPs	Hungary has 45 ATLAS launchers on UNIMOG 4x4 vehicles and 9 radar-equipped MCP mobile firecontrol centeres on the same platform. New Mistral 3 missiles were purchased in 2017 and all launchers were equipped with Safran Matis thermal imaging cameras. The MPCs are also being upgraded.
NASAMS 3	Norway / United States	SAM system	7 batteries	Kongsberg Defence Systems and Raytheon were awarded a 410 million euro contract to deliver the NASAMS 3 system to the Hungarian Defence forces. Hungarian Air Force operates 6 active and 1 reserve NASAMS 3 battery. 180 AIM-120C-7 AMRAAM and 60 AMRAAM-ER were purchased in 2020.
P–18 Spoon Rest	Soviet Union	2D VHF radar	N.A.	Upgraded and modernized by the HM Arzenál Zrt. It is scheduled to be replaced by the new EL/M-2084 system from 2022.
EL/M-2084	Israel	Multi-mission radar (MMR)	5+6	The Hungarian government have ordered multiple ELM-2084 radar systems from Israel Aerospace Industries with Rheinmetall's Canadian subsidiary to start replacing Soviet-made but modernized radars from 2022. Rheinmetall Canada is also establishing assembly and future manufacturing site in Nyírtelek.
Skyranger 30	Germany	Anti-aircraft defense	N.A.	Hungary is looking to buy Lynx-based SHORAD systems. The Skyranger 30 turret is equipped with 30 millimeter KDE cannon and Mistral missiles. Beside the electrooptics the turret will have searching and tracking radar as well. A development was signed in late 2023 for adapting the Skyranger 30 system to the locally made Lynx armoured fighting vehicle.

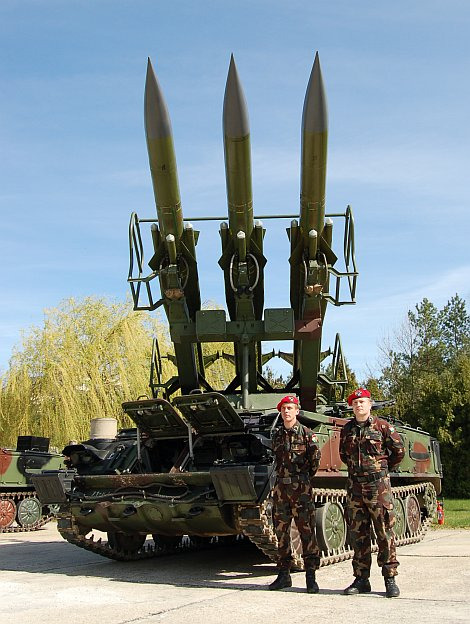
SA-6 Kub in Hungarian service

== Equipment ==
Aircraft	Origin	Type	Variant	In service	Notes
Combat aircraft
JAS 39 Gripen	Sweden	Multirole	EBS HU C	17	Leased from Sweden. 1 crashed 24th August 2026.
Transport
Airbus A319	Germany	Transport		2	Former Air Berlin airliner.
Dassault Falcon 7X	France	Transport		2	
Embraer C-390	Brazil	Aerial refueling / Transport	KC-390	2	
Helicopters
Airbus H145M	France / Germany	Utility		19	
Airbus H225M	France / Germany	Transport		16	
Trainer aircraft
Zlín Z 42	Czech Republic	Basic trainer	242	6	
Zlín Z 43	Czech Republic	Basic trainer	143	2	
Aero L-39 Skyfox	Czech Republic	Advanced trainer / Reconnaissance	8	4 on order	
JAS 39 Gripen	Sweden	Conversion trainer	EBS HU D	2	Leased from Sweden.
Airbus H125	France	Rotorcraft trainer		2	2 acquired from OMSZ Légimentő in 2016.

NOTE: Three C-17 Globemaster IIIs are stationed at Pápa Air Base in Hungary to support NATO's Strategic Airlift Capability operations.

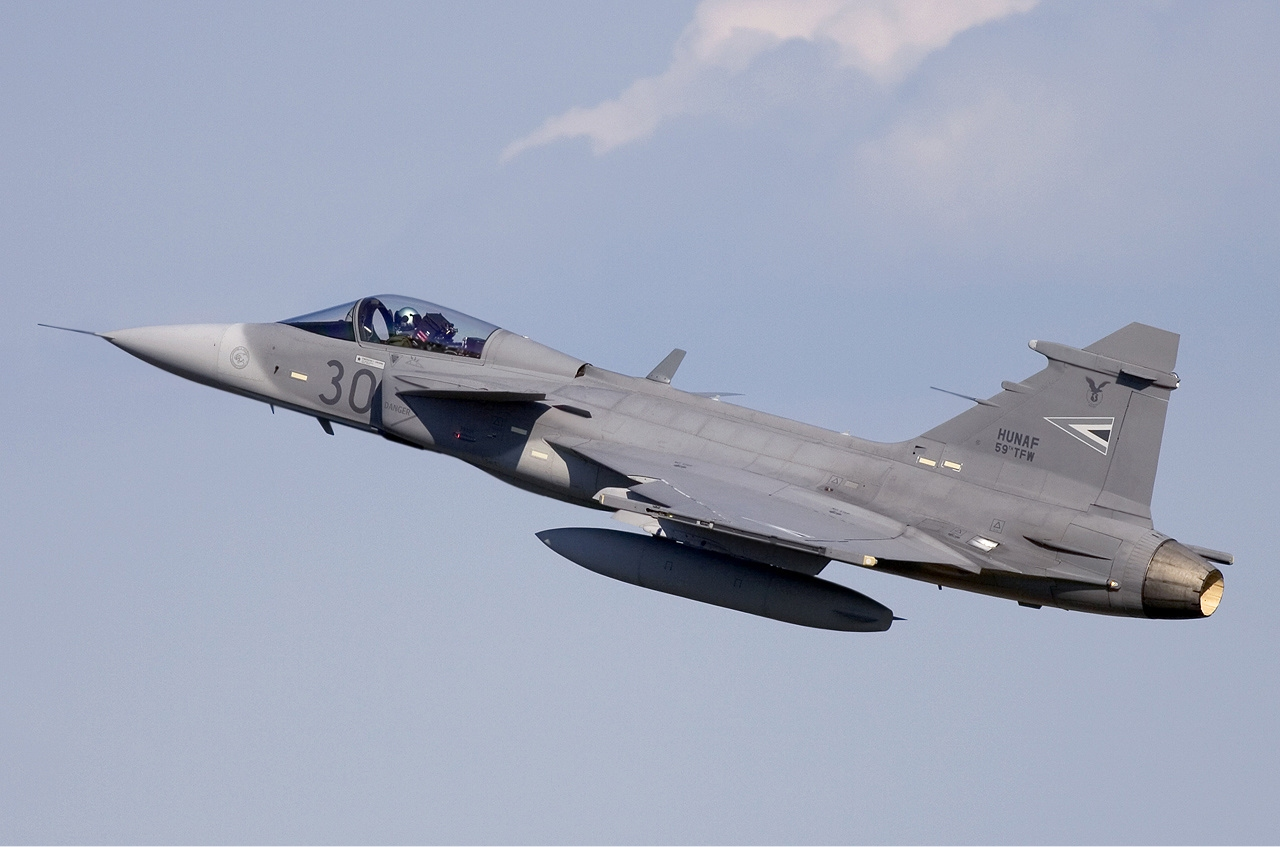
Gripen fighters are the backbone of the HunAF

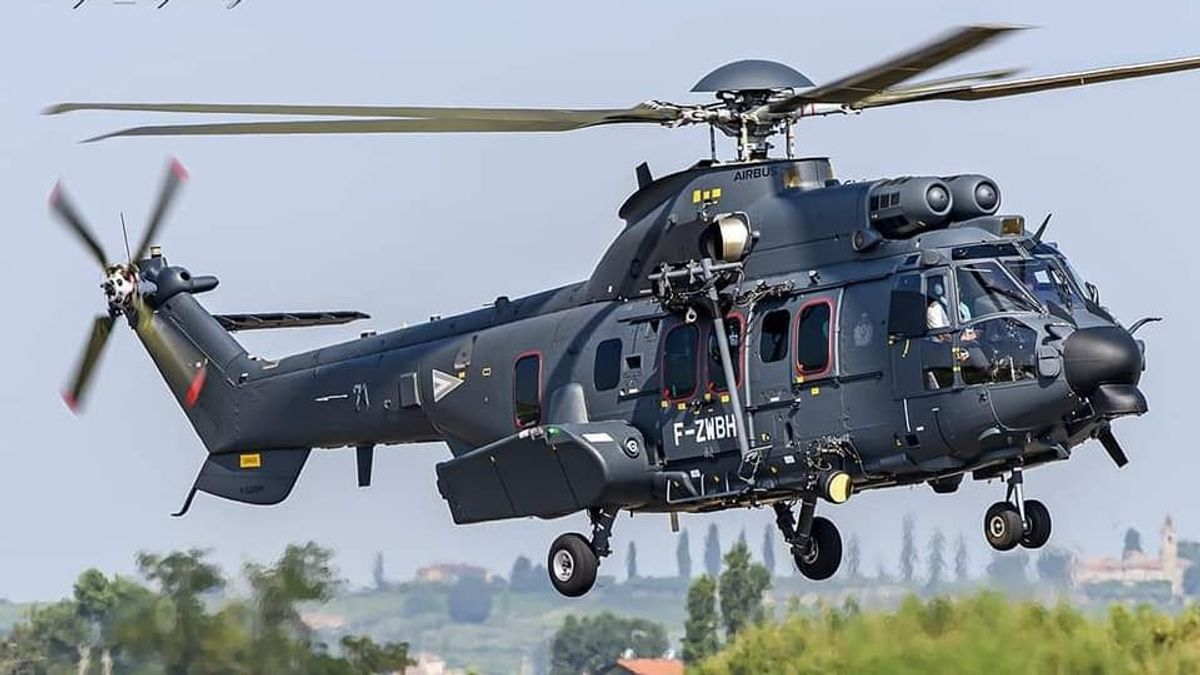
The first Hungarian H225M

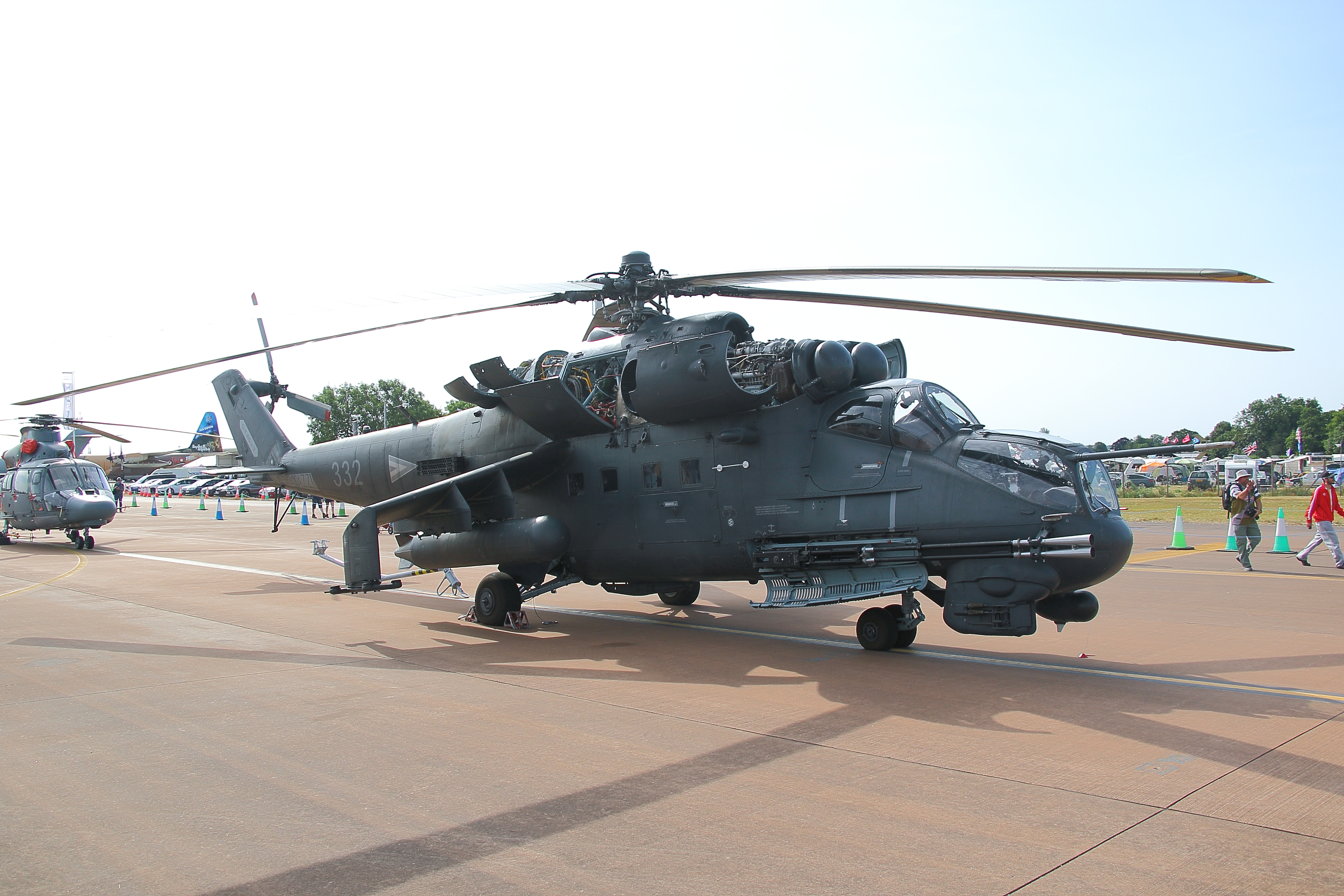
The Mi-24 is phased out per 2026

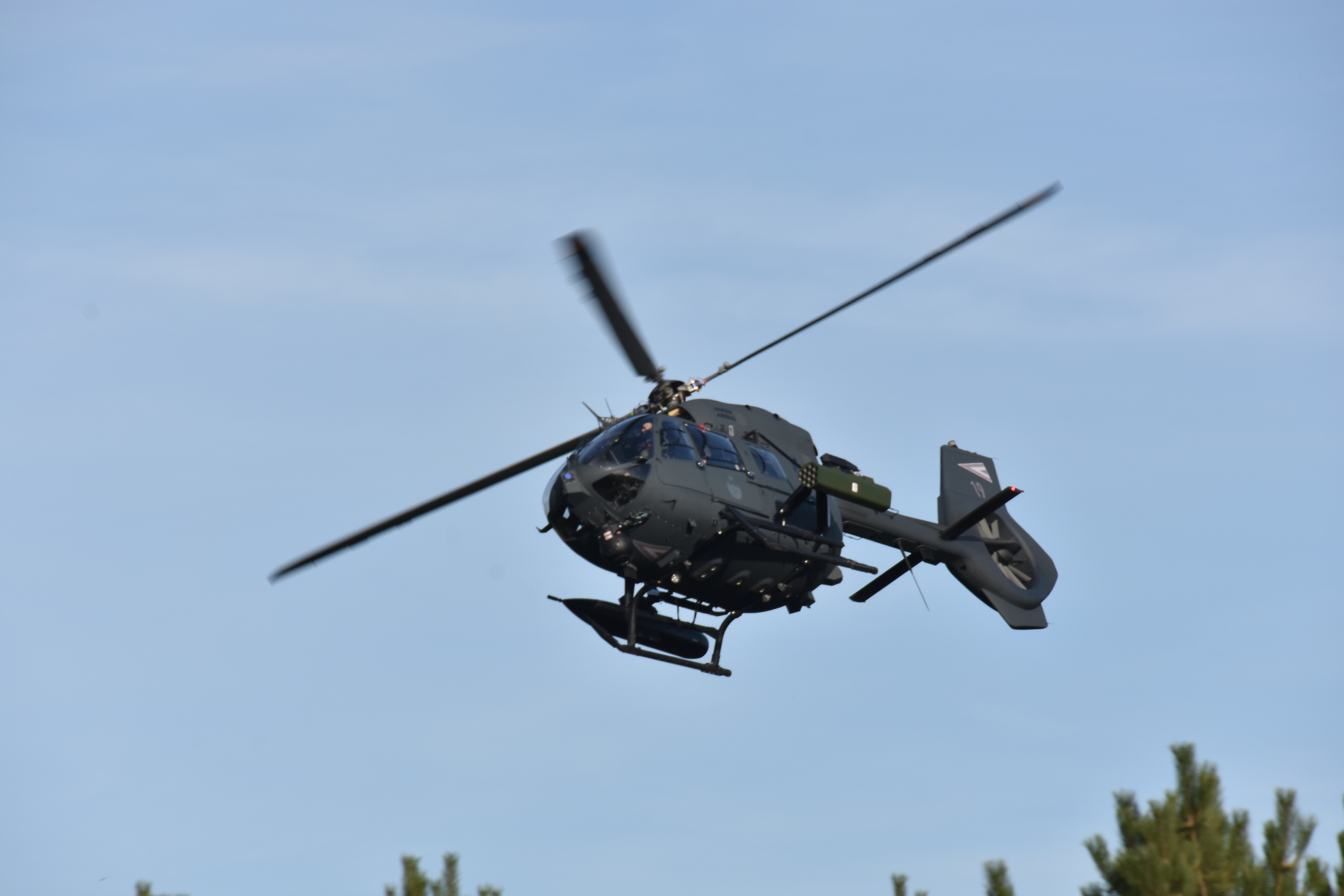
H145M is also used as light attack helicopter with 20 mm cannon pod and 70 mm rockets

== Aircraft markings ==
The Hungarian aircraft marking is a set of aligned triangles which points toward the front of the aircraft. They are the same colour as the Hungarian flag, red, white, and green. The innermost triangle is green, follow by white, and then red. It is displayed on the side of helicopters and in the standard four wing positions on aircraft. It was used by the Royal Hungarian Air Force until 1942, and then reinstated after the Second World War. The new Gripen fighters wear a NATO standard compliant grey-on-grey (low-visibility) version of the Hungarian triangle insignia.

First roundel of the Hungarian Red Air Force
1919

Hungarian Red Air Force
1919

Royal Hungarian Air Force
(1938–1941)

Royal Hungarian Air Force
(1942–1945)

Hungarian People's Army Air Force
(1948–1949)

Hungarian People's Army Air Force
(1949–1951)

Hungarian People's Army Air Force
(1951–1990)

Hungarian Air Force
(1990–1991)

Hungarian Air Force (from 1991-)

Hungarian Air Force low visibility version (since 2007-)

== Ranks and insignia ==
=== Commissioned officer ranks ===
The rank insignia of commissioned officers.

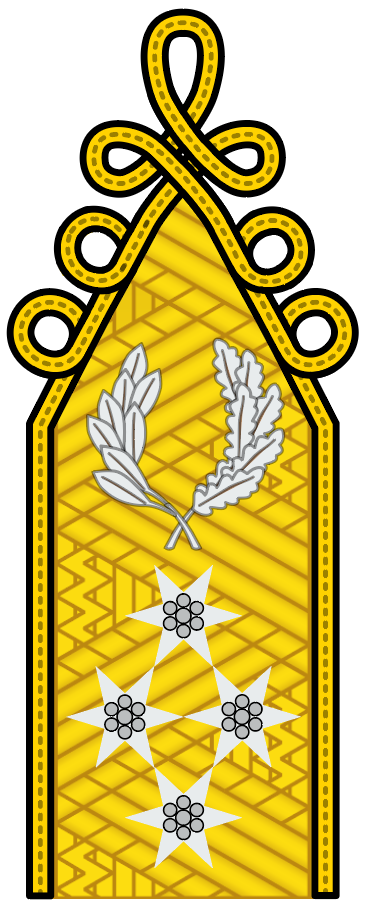
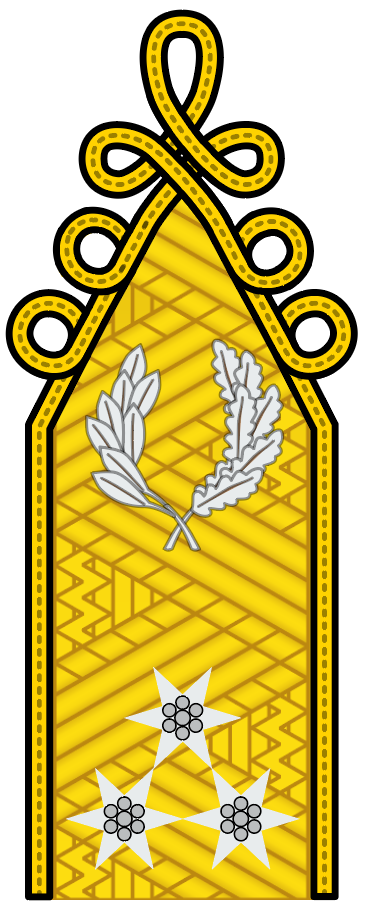
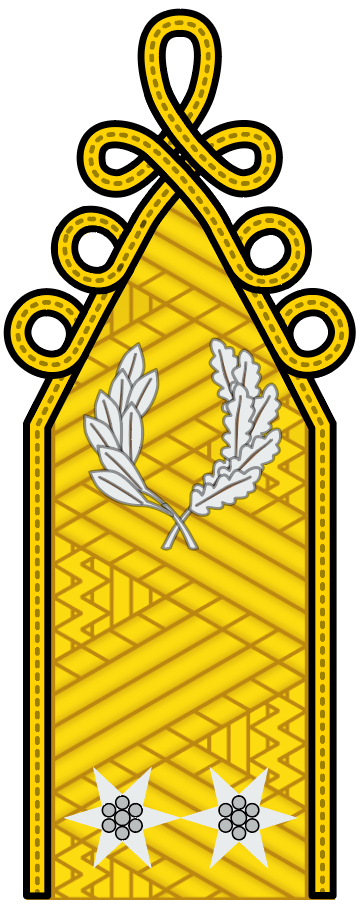
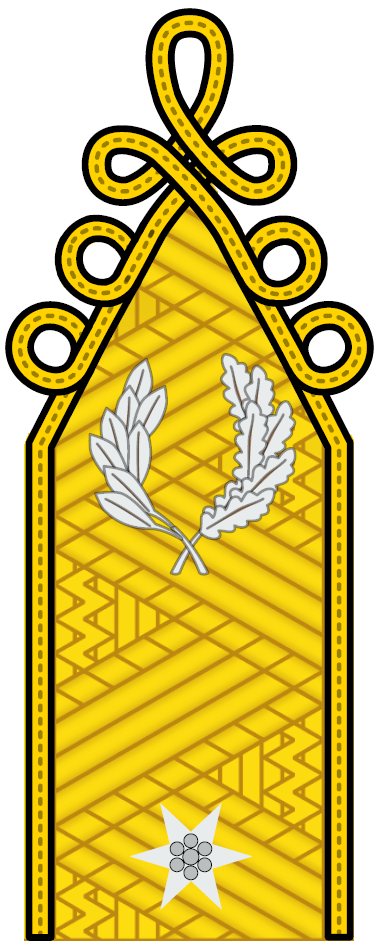
NATO code	OF-10	OF-9	OF-8	OF-7	OF-6	OF-5	OF-4	OF-3	OF-2	OF-1
Hungarian Air Force
Hungarian Air Force		Vezérezredes	Altábornagy	Vezérőrnagy	Dandártábornok	Ezredes	Alezredes	Őrnagy	Százados	Főhadnagy	Hadnagy

=== Other ranks ===
The rank insignia of non-commissioned officers and enlisted personnel.

NATO code	OR-9	OR-8		OR-7	OR-6	OR-5	OR-4	OR-3	OR-2	OR-1
Hungarian Air Force
Hungarian Air Force	Főtörzszászlós	Törzszászlós	Zászlós	Főtörzsőrmester	Törzsőrmester	Őrmester	Szakaszvezető	Tizedes	Őrvezető	Közkatona

== Bibliography ==
- Dorschener, Jim. "Hungary's Fleet Revolution". Air International, Vol. 86, No. 2. February 2014. pp. 72–75. ISSN 0306-5634.
- Owers, Colin (Spring 1994). "Fokker's Fifth: The C.V Multi-role Biplane". Air Enthusiast. No. 53. pp. 60–68. ISSN 0143-5450.
