= László Háry =

Vitéz (Sir) László Háry
- Háry László
- Born: 11 August 1890; Gyömöre, Hungary
- Died: 13 February 1953 (aged 62); Kistarcsa, Hungary
- Burial place: New Public Cemetery, Budapest, Hungary
- Military career
- Branch: Hungarian Air Force
- Rank: Major General
- Awards: Lipót medal

Vitéz (Sir) László Háry (11 August 1890 in Gyömöre – 13 February 1953 in Kistarcsa) was a major general, aviator and a Commander of the First Independent Hungarian Air Force.

== Life ==
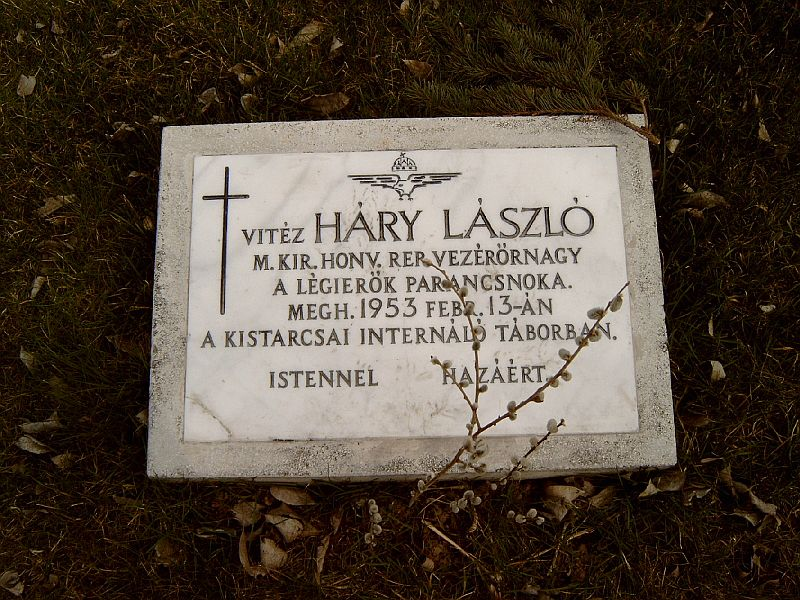
Gravestone in New Public Cemetery, Budapest

During World War I, Háry started as a field pilot, flying behind enemy lines. By July 1918 he had conducted more than 80 air-fights. He was involved in a serious accident and received the Lipót medal.

In 1922 Háry started to teach trainee pilots, together with Waldemár Kenese. Later, he became the leader of the Hungarian Aero Association. In 1938 he achieved the rank of Commander.

After World War II, Háry flew to Italy with his family in a converted Focke-Wulf Fw 58c Wiehe aeroplane, which had been made available for the use of the then Regent, Miklós Horthy. In 1946 he was mentioned in dispatches by the Hungarian War Office, but he was not allowed to return to Italy, where his family were still living. He managed to get there one year later, but a year after that, in 1948, he returned to Hungary.

In 1949 Háry was imprisoned with his brother after his second return. He was not allowed medicinal treatment, and died of heart failure on 13 February 1953.

== Sources ==
- Szakály, Sándor. A magyar katonai elit 1938–1945 [The Hungarian Military Elite] (in Hungarian). Osiris.
