= Albatros L 74 =

General information
- Type: Training aircraft
- National origin: Germany
- Manufacturer: Albatros
- Number built: 2

History
- First flight: 1928

The Albatros L 74 was a two-seated German training biplane, produced by Albatros Flugzeugwerke. Only two were produced.

== Specifications ==
General characteristics

- Crew: 2
- Length: 8.1 m (26 ft 7 in)
- Wingspan: 11.3 m (37 ft 1 in)
- Height: 3.79 m (12 ft 5 in)
- Wing area: 33 m^{2} (360 sq ft)
- Empty weight: 1,250 kg (2,756 lb)
- Powerplant: 1 × BMW IVa inline engine, 300 kW (400 hp)

Performance

- Maximum speed: 175 km/h (109 mph, 94 kn)
- Stall speed: 99 km/h (62 mph, 53 kn)
- Range: 1,500 km (930 mi, 810 nmi)
- Service ceiling: 3,400 m (11,200 ft)

Armament

- Guns: 2×machine guns
