= Gyömöre =

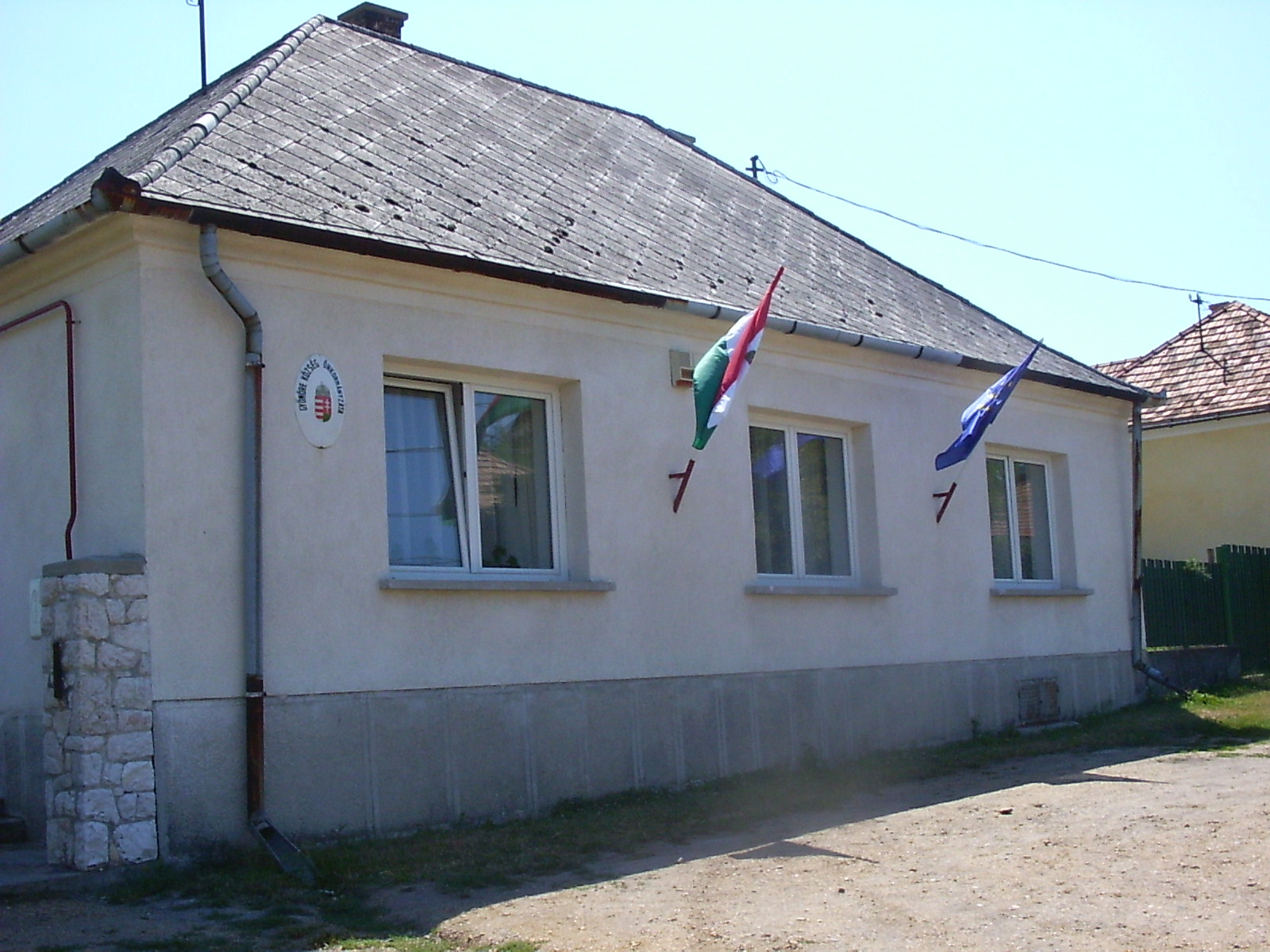
- Municipal office

- Location of Győr-Moson-Sopron county in Hungary

- Location of Gyömöre
- Coordinates: 47.49789°N 17.56714°E
- Country: Hungary
- County: Győr-Moson-Sopron

Area
  - Total: 20.49 km^{2} (7.91 sq mi)

Population (2004)
  - Total: 1,366
  - Density: 66.66/km^{2} (172.6/sq mi)
- Time zone: UTC+1 (CET)
  - Summer (DST): UTC+2 (CEST)
- Postal code: 9124
- Area code: 96

Gyömöre is a village in Győr-Moson-Sopron county, Hungary. It is around 20 km south of Győr.

== Notable residents ==
- László Háry (1890–1953), major general, aviator and a Commander of the First Independent Hungarian Air Force
- Chaim Sofer (1821–1886), Hungarian rabbi
