= Pápa Air Base =

- IATA: QHP; ICAO: LHPA

Summary
- Airport type: Military
- Location: Pápa, Hungary
- Elevation AMSL: 476 ft (145 m)
- Coordinates: 47°21′50″N 17°29′50″E

Map
- Location of air base in Hungary

Runways
Direction	Length		Surface
Direction	m	ft	Surface
16/34	2,399	7,869	Concrete

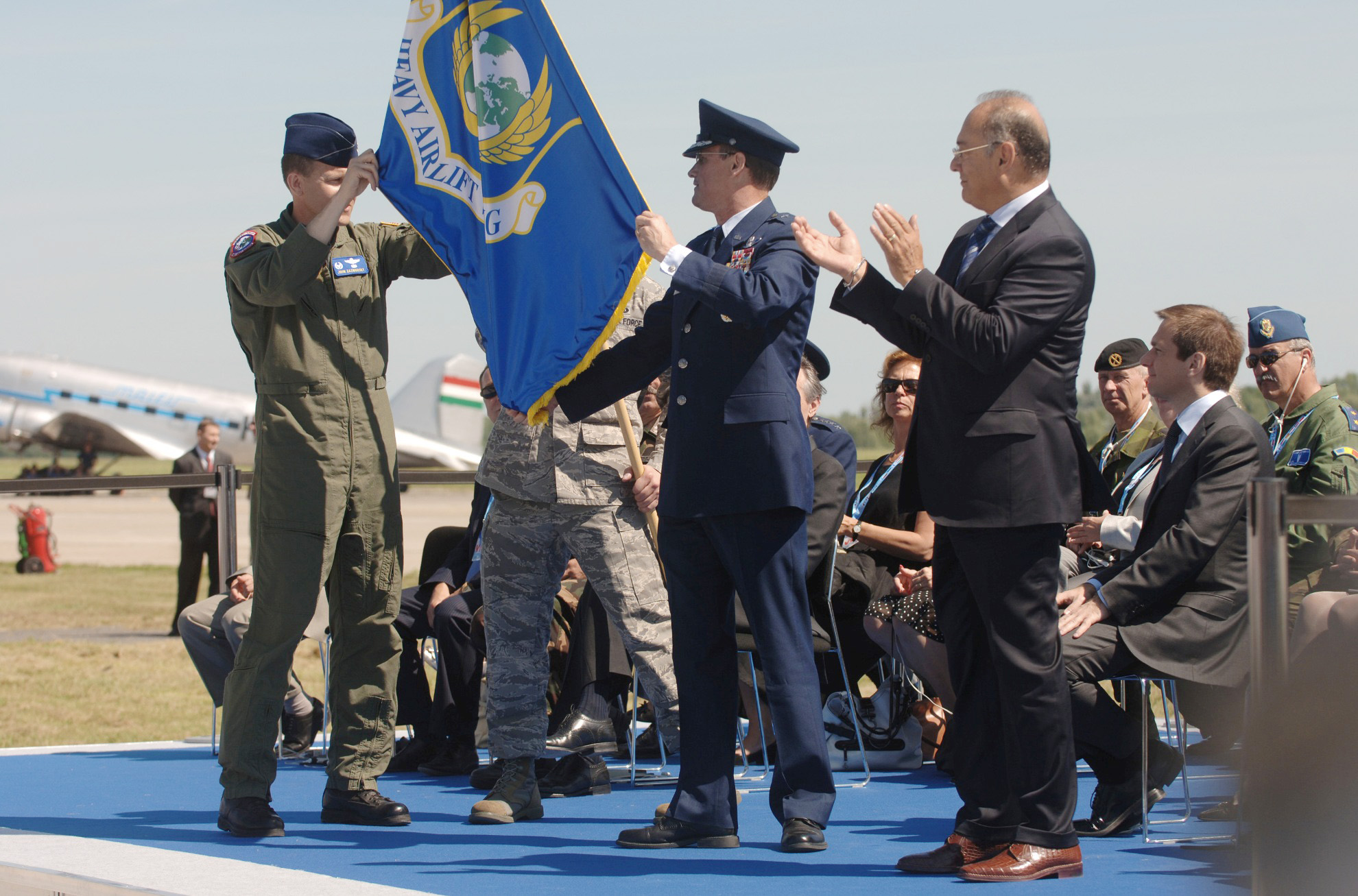

Pápa Air Base (ICAO: LHPA) is a military airbase located near Pápa, Hungary. The building of the airport started in 1936. The Hungarian Air Force has three active air bases, and is the only active air base in western Hungary.

During World War II, several German and Hungarian units used the air base. In 1944 the air base was the biggest air base of the Royal Hungarian Air Force. On October 1, 1939 the Royal Hungarian Army's 1st Parachute Company was created. Commanding officer was captain/major Vitéz Árpád Bertalan. The company was expanded to battalion level in the end of August 1940, and named the Royal Hungarian Army's 1st Honvéd Parachute Battalion.

After World War II, a Soviet fighter regiment was stationed in Pápa. The Soviet Air Force used the base from 1945 until 1961. In 1961 the Hungarian People's Army's Air Force 47th Fighter Regiment became the home regiment of the air base. The regiment was that time equipped with three squadrons of MiG-21F type aircraft. Thirteen years later the squadrons were equipped with MiG-21MF, four years later with the MiG-21bis, and in 1979 the third fighter squadron was equipped with 12 MiG-23MF and four MiG-23UB type aircraft.

In 1962 and 1984 the runway was renovated. In 1992 the regiment changed name to Hungarian Air Force 47th Pápa Tactical Regiment. Following the reorganization, and disbandment of the regiment on June 30, 2001, the Hungarian Air Force Pápa Air Base was established on 1 July 2001.

After that, Pápa Air Base was designated a NATO reserve Base. The base was selected as the Main Operating Base (MOB) hosting three SAC C-17 aircraft for NATO in 2007. Its multinational strategic airlift unit was officially activated on 27 July 2009 as part of the multinational Strategic Airlift Capability consortium. In December 2015, a new Air Traffic Control Tower was inaugurated.
