= NATO Support and Procurement Agency =

NATO's main logistics and procurement agency

Coordinates: 49°38′27″N 05°59′12″E

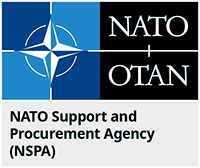
NSPA Logo

The NATO Support and Procurement Agency (NSPA) is NATO's lead organisation for multinational Acquisition, Support and Sustainment in all domains. Established in 1958, NSPA links industry capabilities and national requirements to provide the most efficient, effective and responsive solutions, whether for national or collective defence, leveraging the latest technology and generating economies of scale, interoperability and commonality.

- Consolidation of requirements: As NATO's primary enabler, the Agency's mission is to provide efficient, effective and responsive multinational solutions to the Alliance and Partners.
- Economies of scale: The Agency enables the consolidation and centralisation of functions, reducing costs and logistics footprint through turnkey and proven legal frameworks.
- Multinational funding: NSPA is a customer-funded agency, operating on a no profit-no loss basis.
- Flexibility, speed, agility: Since its establishment in 1958, NSPA acquires, operates, and maintains everything through an unbiased link between industry and the nations

== Main tasks and responsibilities ==
NSPA contributes to NATO's deterrence and defence through its ability to acquire and support complex multinational systems, sustaining them throughout their entire life cycle and supporting operations and exercises. By pooling and sharing resources and supporting coalitions of the willing for acquisition projects - not just in the NATO framework but across the Euro Atlantic area - nations can achieve economies of scale and have access to more capable solutions for either national or collective defence.

Support Partnerships

Support Partnerships are a multinational cooperation mechanism established on the initiative of two or more NATO nations wishing to organise common support and service activities. Participating Nations provide governance and guidance, whereas NSPA develops capabilities and manages Nations' requirements. This is an effective existing framework enabling the consolidation and centralisation of requirements, reducing costs and logistics footprint and providing a common and efficient support under a ready-to-go legal framework. Nations may also leverage the Support Partnership mechanism to address individual national requirements. NSPA currently manages 41 Support Partnerships across all domains.

Acquisition

In 2015, NSPA was appointed by the North Atlantic Council (NAC) to provide armament procurement and acquisition services to NATO. Today, its Acquisition Directorate introduced in 2025 provides a one-stop shop for Acquisition encompassing technical, financial, procurement and legal aspects that can be tailored to customer requirements. The Agency's Acquisition focus is the Acquisition Planning and Development Office (APDO), acting as an immediately available and centralized capability for new acquisition projects. Main programmes: Alliance Future Surveillance and Control (AFSC), initial Alliance Future Surveillance and Control (iAFSC), Next Generation Rotorcraft Capability (NGRC).

Support

NSPA supports NATO operations and exercises through real-life support services, such as accommodation, catering and medical services, infrastructure, airfield and port services, fuel and other logistics services. The Southern Operational Centre (SOC), located in Taranto, Italy, NSPA procures, manages, operates and maintains deployable camp infrastructure and associated contracted services for NATO and its Allies. Additionally, NSPA manages the implementation of NATO Trust Fund projects, supporting security and defence-related projects and building capabilities in partner countries.

NSPA maintains a broad portfolio of products and services in the area of logistics support, such as the NATO Logistics Stock Exchange (NLSE), which allows customers to arrange the exchange of excess spare parts and to manage commonly held stocks, or the General Procurement Shared Services (GPSS), which provides strategic sourcing contracts and access to the NATO eShopping Centre.

From Versailles, France, NSPA manages the Central Europe Pipeline System (CEPS), NATO's largest petroleum pipeline system. Created in the early 1950s, CEPS was established for the transport, storage and distribution of different fuel types to supply the military forces of the Alliance in Central Europe. Since 1960, CEPS also delivers jet fuel to major civil airports such as Brussels, Frankfurt, Luxembourg, Schiphol and Zurich. The non-military use of CEPS is permitted by the North Atlantic Council on the condition that priority is given to military capability.

In Hungary, the NATO Airlift Management Programme (NAMP) supports the Strategic Airlift Capability (SAC) and the Heavy Airlift Wing (HAW) C-17 aircraft. The NAMP acquires, manages and supports airlift assets required for national operations, including those in support of NATO, the European Union, the United Nations and multinational commitments.

Sustainement

NSPA provides, through its Life Cycle Management Business Unit, a broad spectrum of responsive, effective and cost-efficient "cradle to grave" management of defence equipment, products and services to NATO, NATO member and partner nations, individually and collectively.

The integrated capability spectrum includes Systems Acquisition and Armaments procurement, life management, including full logistics fleet support, Integrated Logistics Support and Services, Supply Chain Management and Automation, Strategic Transport and Storage, effective Project Management in all Land, Air, Naval and Joint Services capability domains.

== Structure ==
NSPA's main base is in the Grand Duchy of Luxembourg, with main operational centres in France, Hungary, Italy and The Netherlands. The Agency employs over 1,500 staff and oversees over 100 contractors worldwide.

NSPA reports to the North Atlantic Council. Headed by a General Manager, the Agency is the executive body of the NATO Support and Procurement Organisation (NSPO). The NSPO Agency Supervisory Board (ASB) is the NSPO's governing body, composed of a representative of each of the 32 NATO Member Nations. The ASB provides strategic direction and guidance and oversees the Agency's activities.

== Evolution ==
In 1958, the North Atlantic Council approved the establishment of the NATO Maintenance Supply Services Agency (NMSSA), in Châteauroux, France to meet the logistics requirements of Allied nations. Five years later, NMSSA changed its name becoming the NATO Maintenance and Supply Agency (NAMSA). In 1968, NAMSA moved from its original base in Châteauroux to Luxembourg, where the Agency is still headquartered.

Over the decades, the Agency has adapted to changes in technologies, political and strategic conditions, as well as to NATO's evolving advancements in collective defence logistics.

At the 2010 Lisbon Summit, Allied leaders agreed to reform the 14 existing NATO Agencies, located in seven member countries. In particular, they agreed to streamline the agencies into three major programmatic themes: procurement, support, and communications and information. The reform aimed to enhance efficiency and effectiveness in the delivery of capabilities and services, to achieve greater synergy between similar functions, and to increase transparency and accountability.

As part of the reform process, NSPA was established on 1 July 2012 merging three former in-service support agencies: the NATO Maintenance and Supply Agency (NAMSA), the NATO Airlift Management Agency (NAMA) and the Central Europe Pipeline Management Agency (CEPMA).

In April 2015, the NATO Support Agency became the NATO Support and Procurement Agency, marking the expansion of its capabilities to include all aspects of systems procurement from initial acquisition throughout sustainment.
