= Strategic Airlift Capability =

European and American logistics program

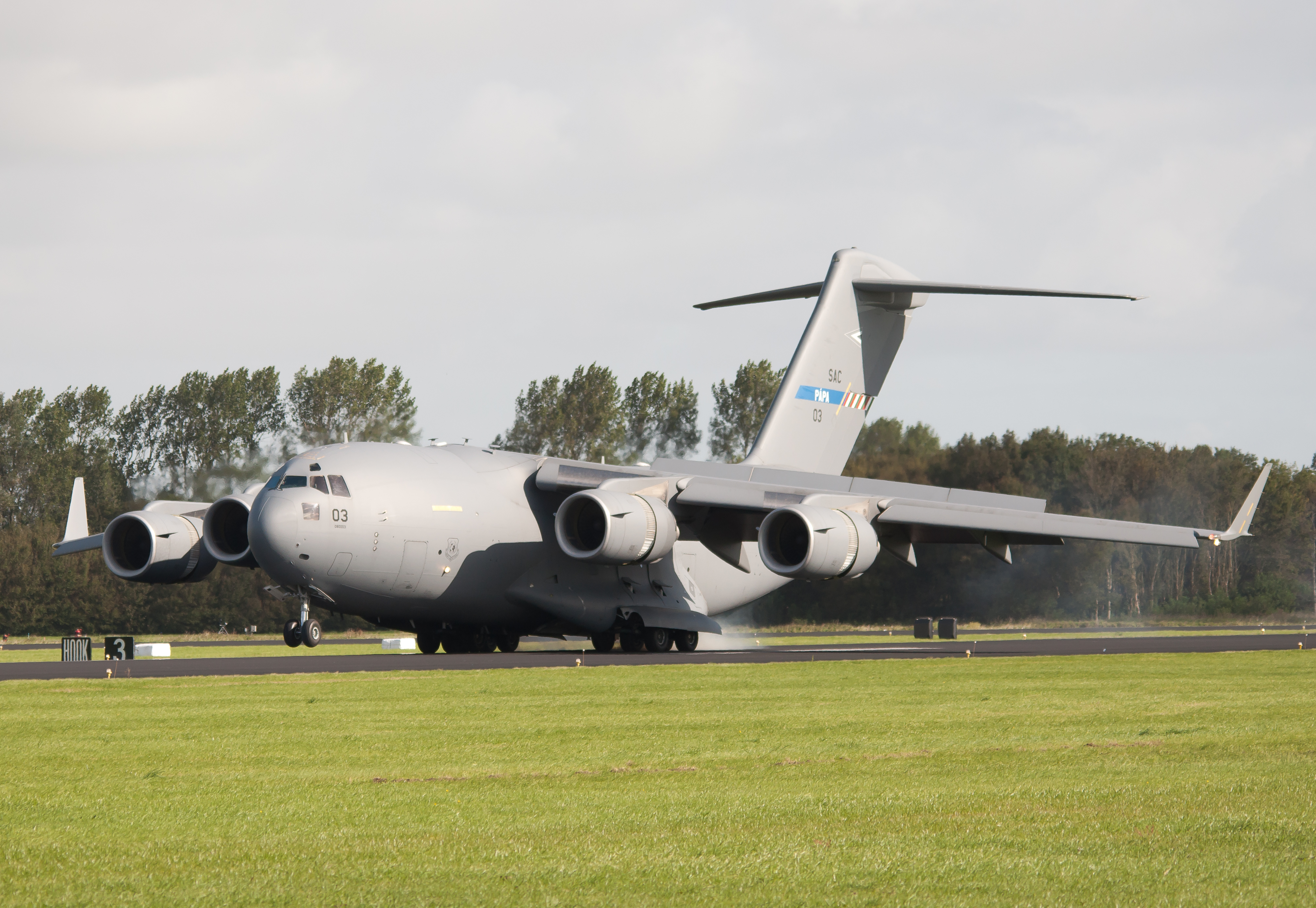
The three Strategic Airlift Capability Boeing C-17 Globemaster III aircraft are owned by the 12 SAC member nations. They are registered and flagged in the program host nation Hungary bearing the name of the SAC home base, HDF Pápa Air Base, on their tails.

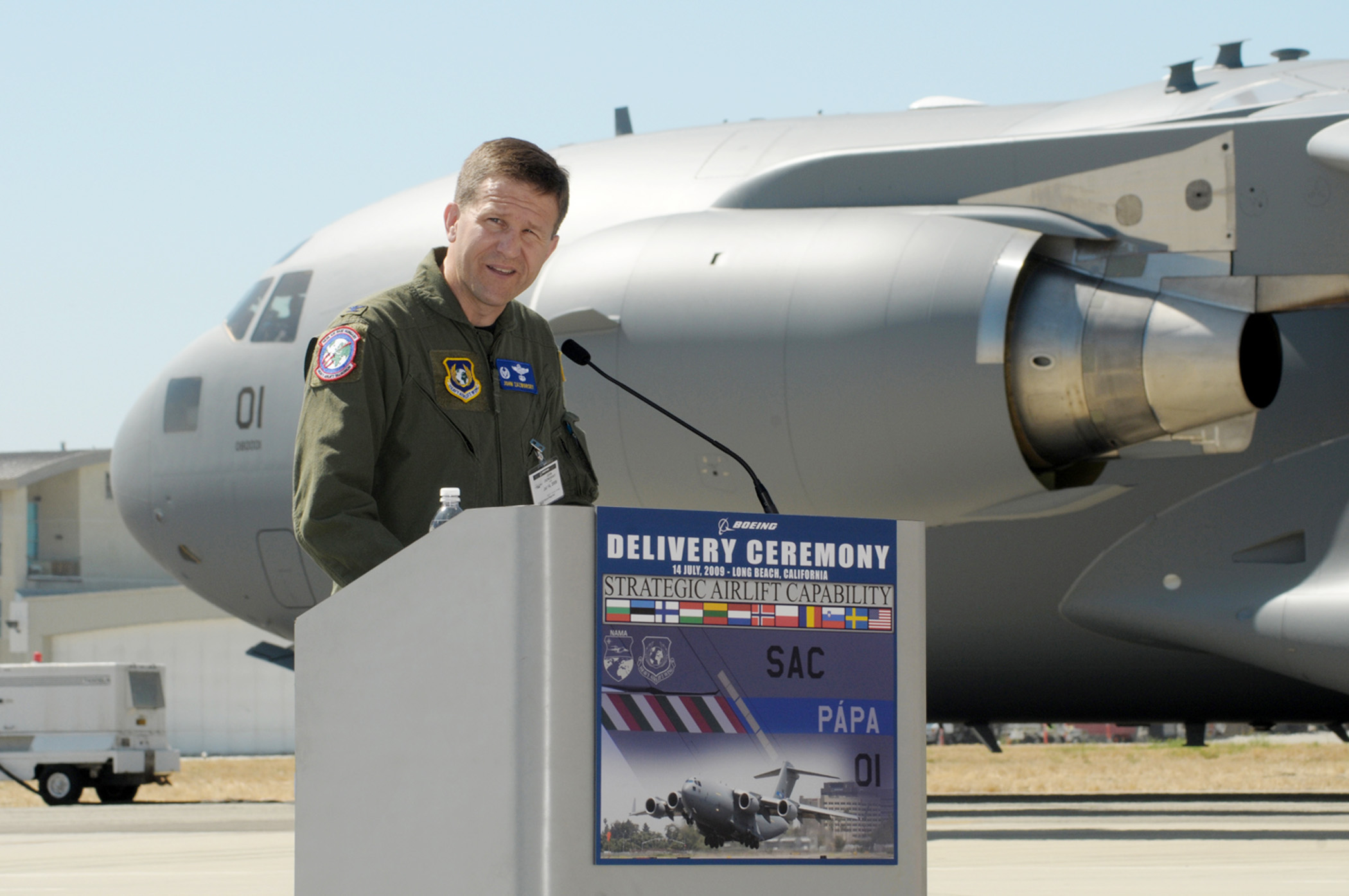
Col. John Zazworsky addresses the audience after officially receiving the first of three C-17 Globemaster IIIs to be acquired by the 12-nation Strategic Airlift Capability Program on 14 July 2009 at Long Beach, California, United States

The Strategic Airlift Capability (SAC) is a multinational initiative that provides its participating nations assured access to military airlift capability to address the growing needs for both strategic airlifts and tactical airlifts.

SAC, established in 2008, is an independent, multinational program that provides the capability of transporting equipment and personnel over long distances to its 12 member nations by owning and operating three Boeing C-17 Globemaster III long range cargo aircraft. The SAC is based at the Hungarian Defence Forces Pápa Air Base in Western Hungary. Each participating nation owns a share of the available flight hours of the SAC C-17's that can be used for missions to serve the needs of their national defense, NATO, EU or UN commitments as well as humanitarian relief efforts.

Hungary plays a special role in the SAC as the host nation. The SAC C-17's are registered and flagged in Hungary bearing the national military aircraft insignia of the nation.

Although the Strategic Airlift Capability relies on certain NATO support structures, it lies outside the command and control of NATO, EU, Partnership for Peace, UN or any other organization that SAC members belong to. The governance of the Strategic Airlift Capability is organized through two cooperating structures, the SAC Steering Board with support by NATO's Airlift Management (NAM) Programme Board. The operational organization of SAC, the Heavy Airlift Wing (HAW), is a multinational force, commanded by a colonel of a member nation.

== History ==
The Strategic Airlift Capability (SAC) concept originated at NATO HQ in mid-2006. NATO officials and national representatives envisaged a partnered solution that would satisfy a need for strategic airlift for member states without the economic resources to field a permanent capability. Originally this idea was called the NATO Strategic Airlift Capability (NSAC). In October 2006 the first non-NATO nation joined the initiative and the concept changed its name to the SAC and moved outside the Alliance.

On 23 September 2008 the 12 nations established the Strategic Airlift Capability by signing the SAC memorandum of understanding.

On 14 July 2009, Strategic Airlift Capability received its first C-17 aircraft, bearing the registration SAC 01. The remaining two aircraft, SAC 02 and 03, were delivered in the following months and operations with the Heavy Airlift Wing started immediately thereafter at Pápa Air Base.

In November 2012 the Heavy Airlift Wing achieved Full Operational Capability (FOC). The unit was then considered fully capable of missions containing air refueling, single ship airdrop, assault landings, all-weather operations day or night into low-to-medium-threat environments, limited aeromedical evacuation operations and utilizing C-17 air-land and air-drop mission capabilities.

== Membership ==
Member states are Bulgaria, Estonia, Finland, Hungary, Lithuania, the Netherlands, Norway, Poland, Romania, Slovenia, Sweden and the United States. All of these are NATO member states.

The governing body of the program is the Strategic Airlift Capability Steering Board, supported by the NATO Airlift Management Programme Board that consists of representatives of the member nations.

The SAC Steering Board exercises overall responsibility for the guidance, execution and oversight of the Strategic Airlift Capability in accordance with the SAC memorandum of understanding. It formulates SAC requirements and communicates them to the NAM Programme Board for execution.

The Strategic Airlift Capability has a lifespan of a minimum of 30 years and its member nations have committed to constant development of the program and its capabilities.

The aircraft and supporting equipment operated by the Heavy Airlift Wing are owned by the SAC Nations collectively. The NATO Airlift Management Programme Office (NAM PO), an integral part of NATO Support and Procurement Agency (NSPA), processes the acquisition and maintenance of the SAC C-17 weapon system. It also provides site and administration support to the HAW. Boeing, the manufacturer of the C-17, is responsible for contract flight line maintenance; engineering and technical support; and management and supply of spare parts. The C-17 aircraft and their support were acquired from Boeing under the Foreign Military Sales (FMS) program of the U.S. Department of Defense.

== Heavy Airlift Wing ==
Heavy Airlift Wing
- Heavy Airlift Wing emblem
- Active: 27 July 2009 – present
- Type: Strategic Airlift
- Size: c. 150 multinational military personnel
- Garrison/HQ: Pápa Air Base, Hungary
- Mottos: 12 Nations, 1 Team
- Anniversaries: 27 July
- Website: www.heavyairliftwing.org

Commanders
- Current commander: Colonel Harry Oostema, Royal Netherlands Air Force

Aircraft flown
- Transport: C-17 Globemaster III

The Heavy Airlift Wing (HAW) is the operational organization of SAC. It is based at Pápa Air Base, Hungary. The organization consists of several European states and the United States. It was officially activated on 27 July 2009 as part of the SAC program, which purchased and operates three C-17 Globemaster III military transport aircraft that fly under the national markings of Hungary. The Heavy Airlift Wing is currently commanded by a Colonel from the U.S. Air Force, and is composed of up to 155 military personnel from the 12 participating states; Bulgaria, Estonia, Finland, Hungary, Lithuania, the Netherlands, Norway, Poland, Romania, Slovenia, Sweden, and the United States. Strategic Airlift Capability members send their personnel to work for the Heavy Airlift Wing on temporary or permanent positions.

The SAC members have requested missions in order to meet their obligations to employ/deploy/redeploy forces and equipment in support of national, UN, EU, NATO obligations, exercises, training and humanitarian relief, including the International Security Assistance Force 2009–2014, and the Resolute Support Mission, 2015–2021 in Afghanistan. Operation Unified Protector in Libya, 2011. United Nations Multidimensional Integrated Stabilization Mission in Mali, 2013–. The EUFOR RCA, 2014–2015. The United Nations Multidimensional Integrated Stabilization Mission in the Central African Republic, 2015–. The wing has also conducted missions to provide logistical support to the investigation of the 2014 Malaysia Airlines MH17 crash in Ukraine. Significant humanitarian operations supported by the wing include earthquake relief in Haiti, 2010, flood relief in Pakistan, 2010, and hurricane relief to the island of Saint Martin, 2017.

The HAW is independent of any command by NATO, European Union, Partnership for Peace, United Nations, or any other organization that HAW member states belong to or support in the various missions. It is overseen by the SAC Steering Board, which manages its activities with support of NATO Airlift Management Programme Office (NAM PO). The SAC sets requirements and the NAM PO executes those requirements by sourcing the majority of the technical, logistic, and training support to the C-17 fleet from the United States and its military and Foreign Military Sales (FMS) programs, including C-17 maintenance which are contracted with Boeing.

Share memberstates
Member state	Flight hours share
United States	1000
Sweden	550
The Netherlands	500
Norway	400
Romania	200
Poland	150
Finland	100
Bulgaria	65
Slovenia	60
Hungary	50
Estonia	45
Lithuania	45

=== Operations ===
The first aircraft was delivered on 14 July 2009. The C-17 Globemasters are based at Pápa Air Base in Hungary.

A unique feature of the SAC program is its aviation safety certification system. This system called the Concept of Total Aviation Safety (CONTAS) is based upon a heavily adapted version of the United States Air Force C-17 safety system, the principles of design and operation of heavy airlift aircraft as described by the European Aviation Safety Agency (EASA), and the mandatory requirements of the Hungarian National Transport Authority who are the national authority that registers the aircraft and certifies the operations of the HAW, and the support provided by NAM PO. This system has been accepted by all the SAC nations and as such is one of the World's first true multi-national military aviation safety systems.

=== Deployments ===
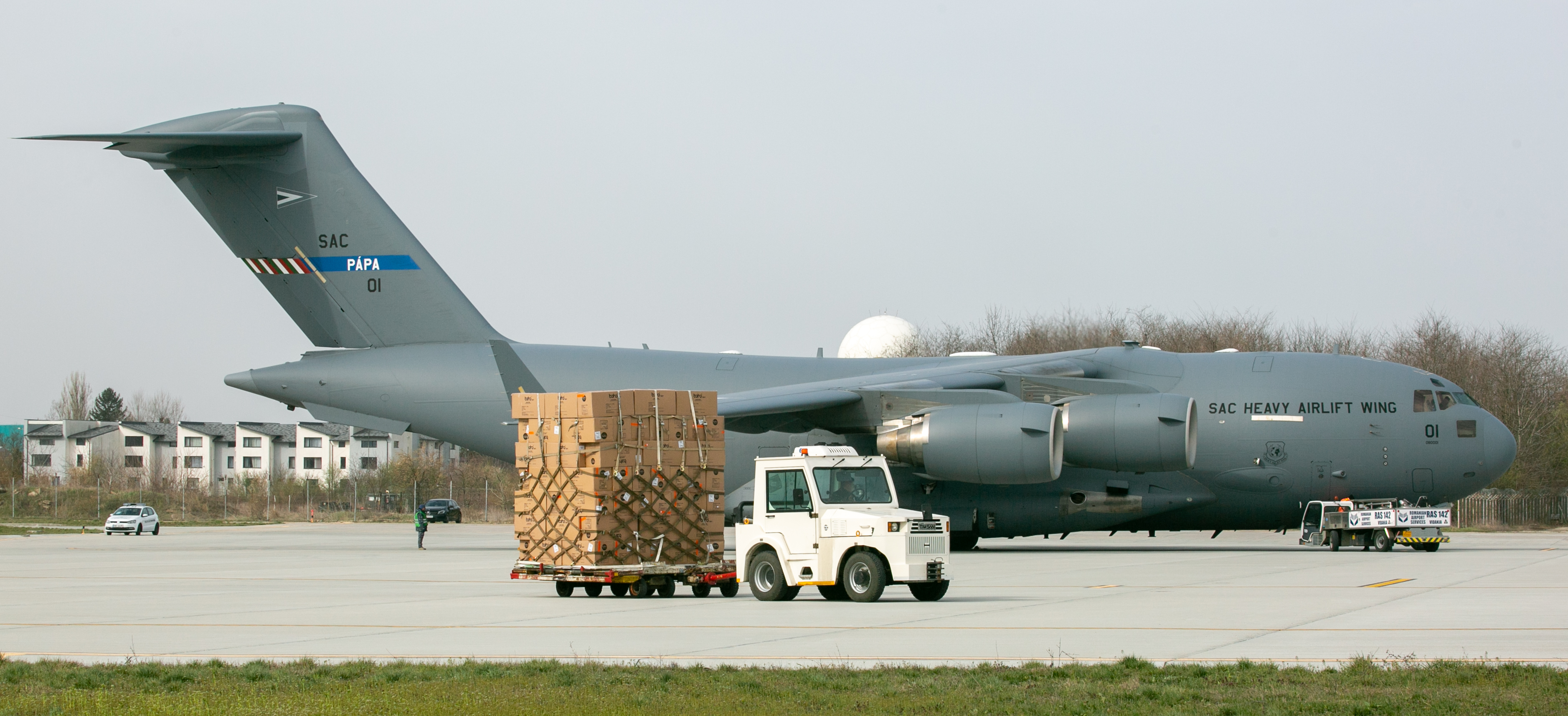
A Strategic Airlift Capability C-17 at Otopeni delivering medical equipment from South Korea in 2020

The HAW aircraft can respond to a wide selection of airlift needs by member countries. The operations can include national support to EU / NATO / UN operations or national military, peacekeeping and humanitarian relief operations wherever and whenever needed by the partner nations.

Since 2009 the Strategic Airlift Capability has supported a variety of operations at its 12 member nations' requests including the International Security Assistance Force 2009–2014, and the Resolute Support Mission, RSM, 2015 – in Afghanistan. Operation Unified Protector in Libya, 2011. United Nations Multidimensional Integrated Stabilization Mission in Mali, 2013-. The EUFOR RCA, 2014–2015. The United Nations Multidimensional Integrated Stabilization Mission in the Central African Republic, 2015-. In addition to these operations, significant humanitarian operations supported include earthquake relief in Haiti, 2010, flood relief in Pakistan, 2010, and hurricane relief to the island of St. Maarten, 2017.

Strategic Airlift Capability has also participated in the logistics support provided to the investigation of the 2014 Malaysia Airlines MH17 crash in Ukraine. In 2015, a Strategic Airlift Capability C-17 transported patients with severe burn injuries from Bucharest to the United Kingdom and Norway following the Colectiv nightclub fire.

As of December 2016, the Strategic Airlift Capability C-17 fleet has achieved over 21,000 flying hours, flown over 1,700 missions, delivered over 138 million pounds (over 62,000 tons) of cargo and carried almost 100,000 passengers.

During the COVID-19 pandemic in 2020, the Strategic Airlift Capability conducted Emergency Response Missions to Romania, The Netherlands, Bulgaria, and Hungary delivering medical equipment. The SAC transported about 250 tons of equipment from the Far East.

At least one Strategic Airlift Capability C-17 was used in the August 2021 evacuation of Kabul. Nearly 3,000 civilians were evacuated from Kabul in 12 missions for two weeks.

The Strategic Airlift Capability was used to transport search and rescue equipment in the aftermath of the 2023 Turkey–Syria earthquake.

=== Component units ===
The following units are part of the Heavy Airlift Wing:

- Command Staff Group
  - Heavy Airlift Squadron
  - Command and Control Squadron
  - Logistics Support Squadron

=== Fleet ===
The fleet consists of:

Caption
Registration	Image	Chassis number
SAC-01		C/N 50208
SAC-02		C/N 50211
SAC-03		C/N 50212
