= Structure of the Hungarian Defence Forces =

This article represents the structure of the Hungarian Defence Forces as of 2020:

== Command structure ==
Unit colour of the Hungarian Defence Force

Flag of the president of Hungary as commander-in-chief of the Hungarian Defence Force

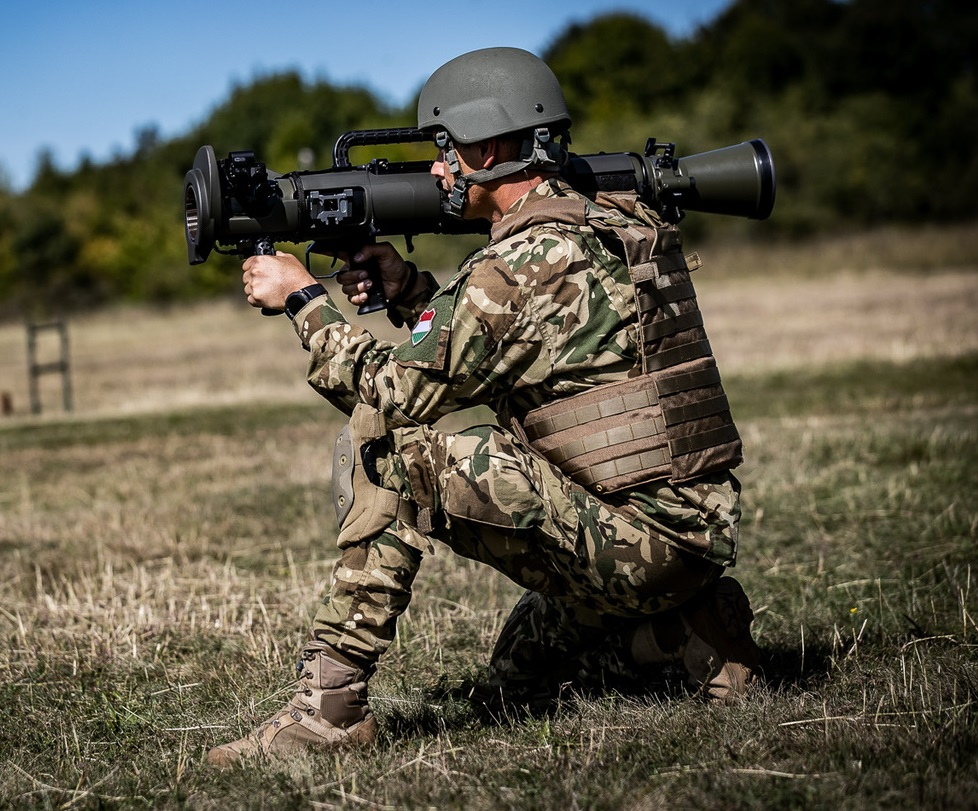
Hungarian soldier with Carl Gustaf M4 in 2019.

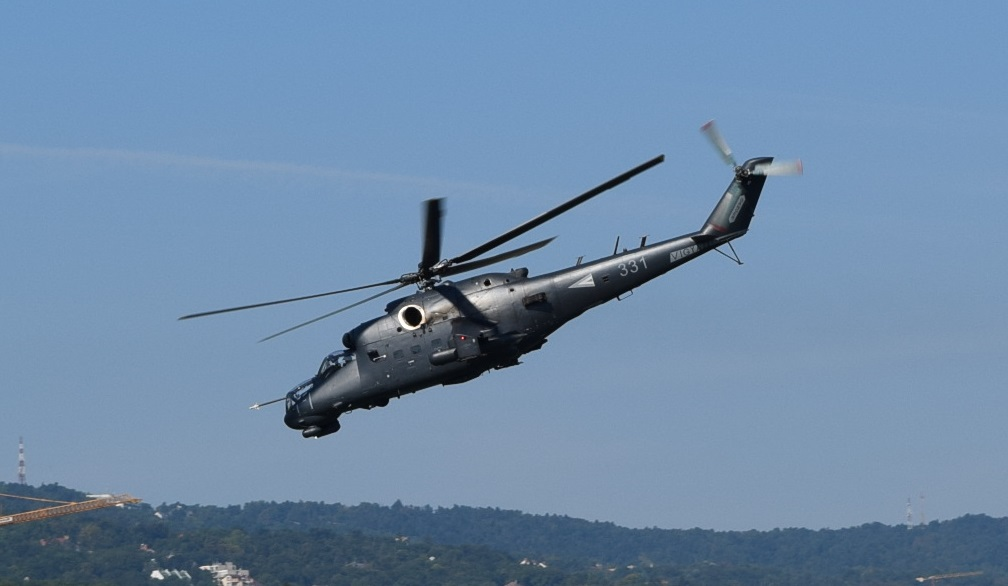
Hungarian Air Force Mi-24 P in 2019

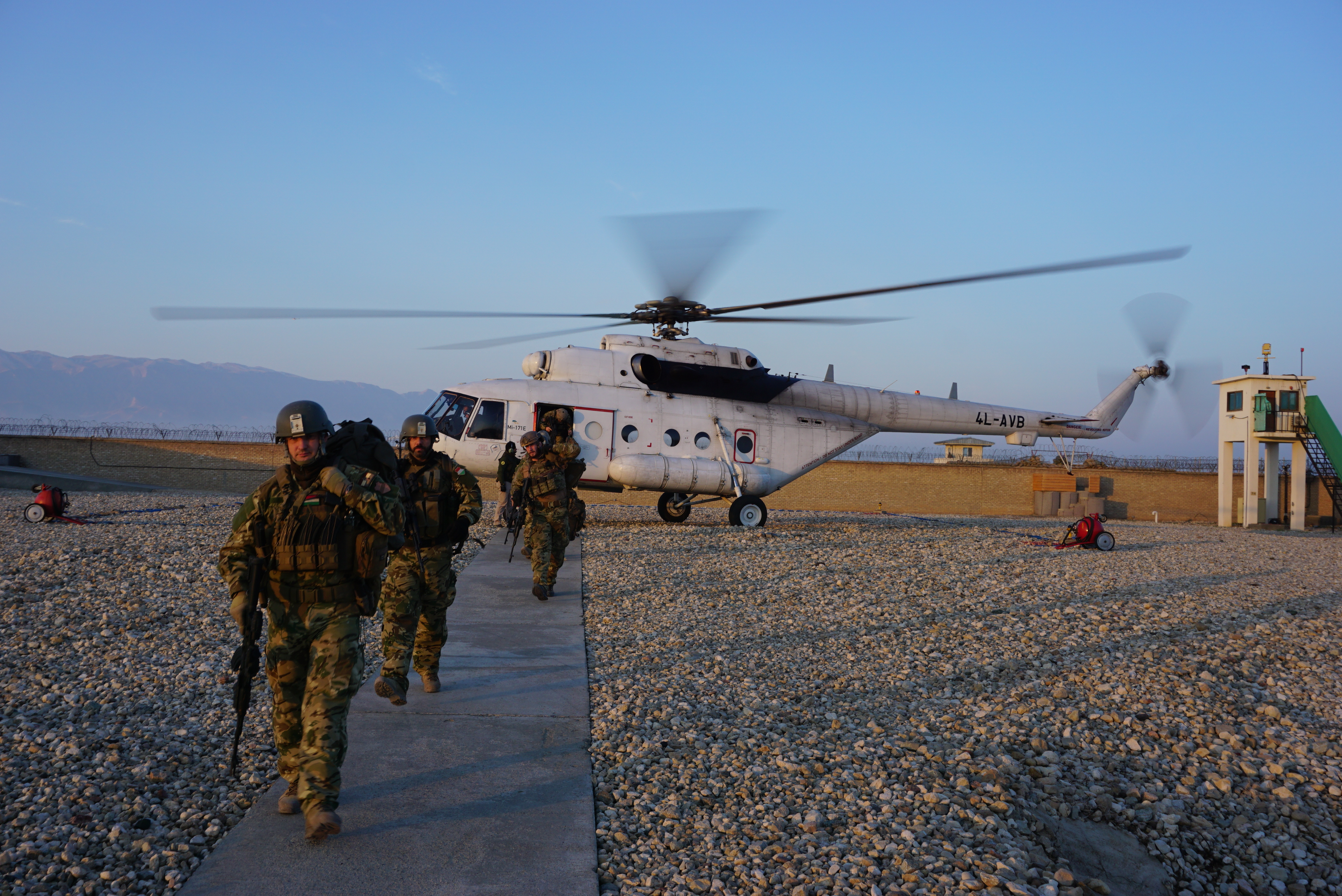
Hungarian soldiers disembark from a Mil Mi-171E in Afghanistan in 2018

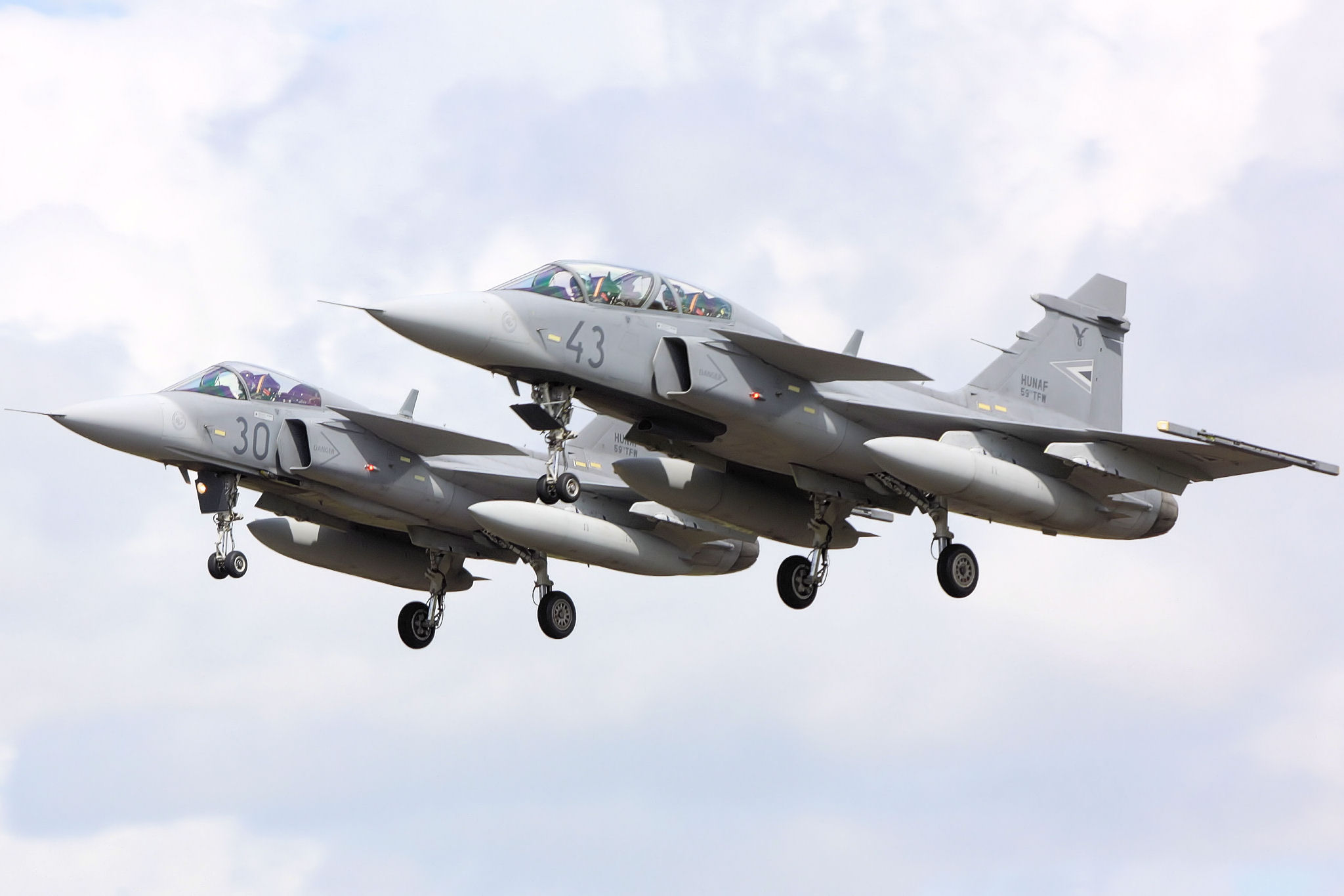
The Hungarian Air Force has 14 JAS 39 Gripens on lease, including two two-seaters (C/D versions)

Article 45 of the Constitution of Hungary states that the core duties of the Hungarian Defence Forces are: "military defence of the independence, territorial integrity and borders of Hungary and the performance of collective defence and peacekeeping tasks arising from international treaties, as well as carrying out humanitarian activities in accordance with the rules of international law."

The President holds the title of commander-in-chief of the Defence Force. The Government (chaired by the Prime Minister) decides on the deployment and operations undertaken by the Defence Force, all deployments abroad with the exception of EU or NATO missions, needs permission from the National Assembly. The Minister of Defence jointly with Chief of Staff administers the Defence Force, including the Hungarian Ground Force and the Hungarian Air Force.

Since 2007, the Hungarian Defence Force has been under a unified command structure with all operational units falling under the Hungarian Defence Forces Combat Command. The previous Land Command became a joint-service, army and air, command. The two branches of the Defence Forces – the Hungarian Air Force and Hungarian Ground Forces have now only administrative functions.

Logistic Support for the defence forces is managed by the Hungarian Defence Forces Logistics Center, while the training for all units is the responsibility of the Hungarian Defence Forces Formation, Preparation and Training Command.

=== Organization ===
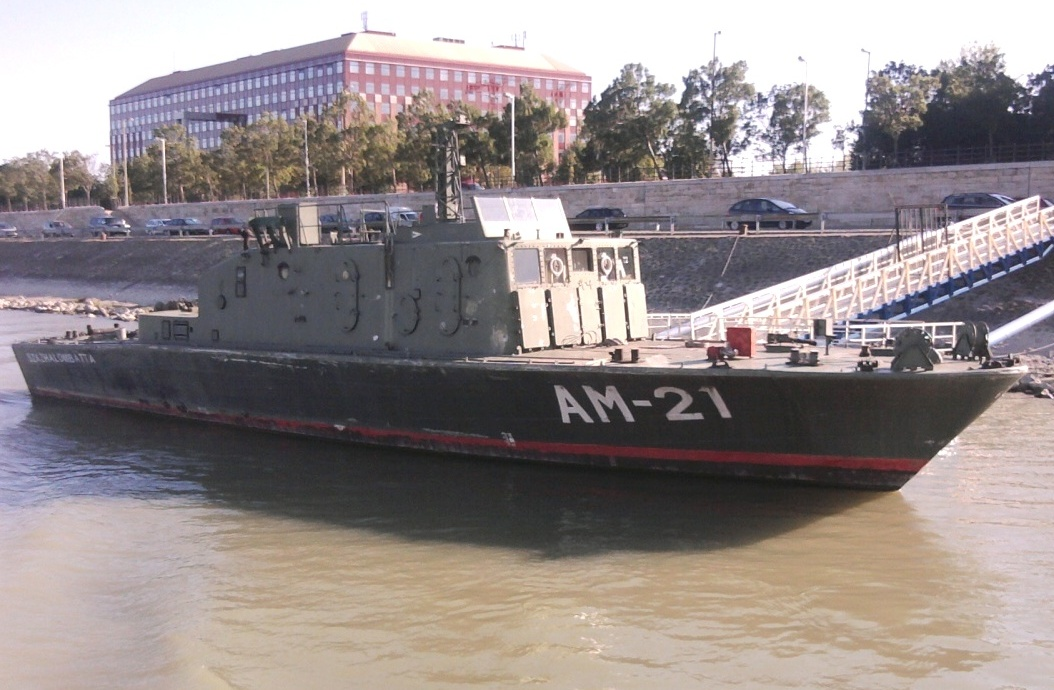
Retired AM-21 Százhalombatta minesweeper in Budapest, other Yugoslav-made Nestin MS-25 minesweepers still used in Hungary

- Units reporting directly to the Hungarian Defence Forces Staff:
  - Hungarian Defence Forces Medical Center, in Budapest
  - Battalion "Ludovika", in Budapest
  - Hungarian Defence Forces Military Representative Office "Count Gyula Andrássy, in Brussels (at the NATO and EU headquarters)
  - Hungarian Defence Forces National Military Representation, in Mons (at NATO's Supreme Headquarters Allied Powers Europe)
  - Hungarian Defence Forces National Liaison Office, in Norfolk (at NATO's Allied Command Transformation)
  - Military History Institute and Museum, in Budapest
  - Catholic Bishopric – Military Ordinariate, in Budapest
  - Military National Security Service, in Budapest

==== Joint Operations Command ====
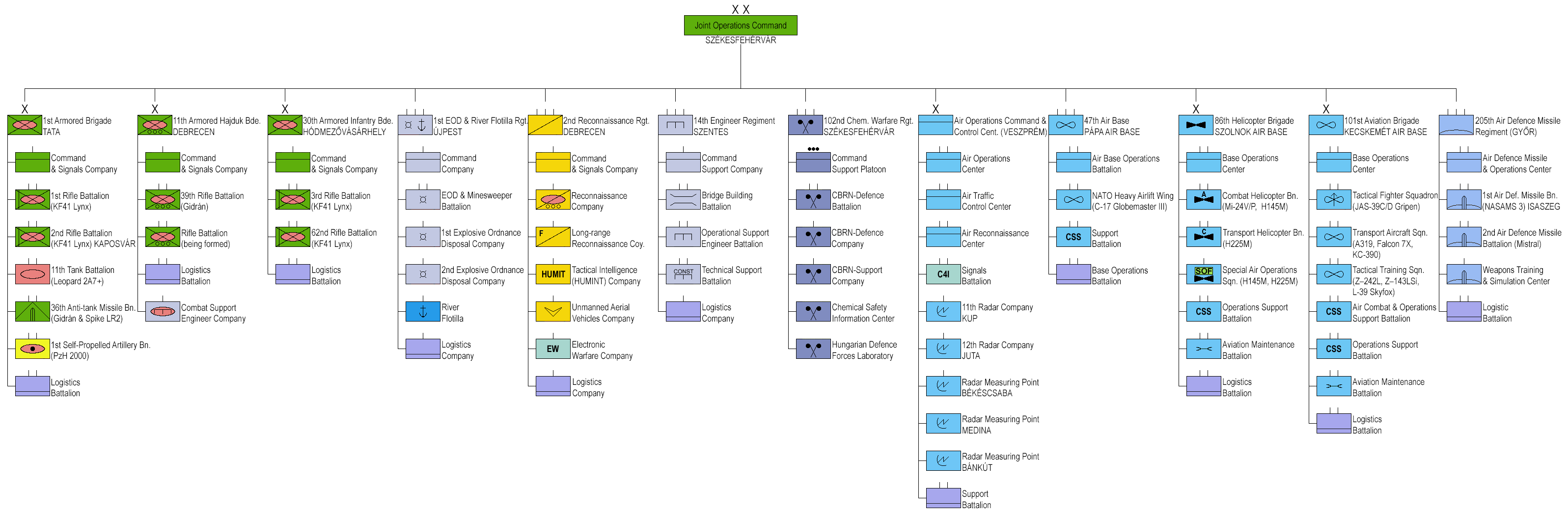
Hungarian Defence Forces Joint Operations Command organization 2025

- Joint Operations Command, in Székesfehérvár
  - 1st Armored Brigade "György Klapka", in Tata
    - Command and Signals Company, in Tata
    - 1st Rifle Battalion, in Tata; with BTR-80 armored personnel carriers (being replaced by KF41 Lynx infantry fighting vehicles)
    - 2nd Rifle Battalion, in Kaposvár; with BTR-80 armored personnel carriers (being replaced by KF41 Lynx infantry fighting vehicles)
    - 11th Tank Battalion "Ervin Tarczay", in Tata; with Leopard 2A7+ main battle tanks
    - 36th Anti-tank Missile Battalion, in Tata; with Gidrán vehicles and Spike LR2 anti-tank guided missiles
    - 1st Self-Propelled Artillery Battalion "József Barankay", in Tata; with Panzerhaubitze 2000 155 mm self-propelled howitzers
    - Logistics Battalion, in Tata
  - 11th Armored Hajduk Brigade "István Bocskai", in Debrecen
    - Command and Signals Company, in Debrecen
    - 39th Rifle Battalion, in Debrecen; with BTR-80 armored personnel carriers (being replaced by Gidrán vehicles)
    - (A second rifle battalion will be formed)
    - Logistics Battalion, in Debrecen
    - Combat Support Engineer Company, in Debrecen
  - 30th Armored Infantry Brigade "Pál Kinizsi", in Hódmezővásárhely
    - Command and Signals Company, in Hódmezővásárhely
    - 3rd Rifle Battalion "Miklós Bercsényi", in Hódmezővásárhely; with KF41 Lynx infantry fighting vehicles
    - 62nd Rifle Battalion, in Hódmezővásárhely; with BTR-80 armored personnel carriers (being replaced by KF41 Lynx infantry fighting vehicles)
    - Logistics Battalion, in Hódmezővásárhely
  - 1st Explosive Ordnance Disposal and River Flotilla Regiment "Honvéd", at Újpest military port in Budapest
    - Explosive Ordnance Disposal and Minesweeper Battalion
    - 1st Explosive Ordnance Disposal Company
    - 2nd Explosive Ordnance Disposal Company
    - River Flotilla
    - Logistics Company
  - 2nd Reconnaissance Regiment "Gergely Bornemissza", in Debrecen
    - Command and Signals Company, in Debrecen
    - Reconnaissance Company, in Debrecen
    - Long-range Reconnaissance Company, in Debrecen
    - Tactical Intelligence (HUMINT) Company, in Debrecen
    - Electronic Warfare Company, in Debrecen
    - Unmanned Aerial Vehicles Company, in Debrecen
    - Logistics Company, in Debrecen
  - 14th Engineer Regiment "Ferenc Rákóczi II", in Szentes
    - Command Support Company, in Szentes
    - Operational Support Engineer Battalion, in Szentes
    - Bridge Building Battalion, in Szentes
    - Technical Support Battalion, in Szentes
    - Logistics Company, in Szentes
  - 102nd Chemical Warfare Regiment "László Sodró", in Székesfehérvár
    - Command Support Platoon
    - CBRN-Defence Battalion
    - CBRN-Defence Company
    - CBRN-Support Company
    - Disaster Management Department
    - Operational Evaluation Department
    - Hungarian Defence Forces Laboratory
    - Chemical Safety Information Center
  - Air Operations Command and Control Center, in Veszprém
    - Air Operations Center, in Veszprém
      - Operations Shift
      - Air Operations Planning Group
      - Airlift Group
      - Military Air Traffic Management Group
    - Air Traffic Control Center, in Veszprém
      - Operations Shift
      - Meteorological Center
      - Operations Support Meteorological Center, in Budapest
      - Operations Training Group
      - Training and Reserve Command Center, at Kecskemét Air Base
    - Air Reconnaissance Center
    - 11th Radar Company, in Kup
    - 12th Radar Company, in Juta
    - Radar Measuring Point, in Békéscsaba; with RAT-31DL
    - Radar Measuring Point, in Medina; with RAT-31DL
    - Radar Measuring Point, in Bánkút; with RAT-31DL
    - Information Technology Center
    - Regional CBRN Monitoring Center
    - Signals Battalion
    - Support Battalion
  - 47th Air Base, at Pápa Air Base
    - Air Base Operations Battalion
    - NATO Heavy Airlift Wing (NATO Strategic Airlift Capability); with 3x C-17 Globemaster III
      - Air Base Operations and Maintenance Company
      - Aviation Support Squadron
      - Ground Flight Control Service Platoon
      - Firefighting and CBRN-Defence Platoon
      - Air Traffic Control Center
      - Meteorological Group
      - Passenger Terminal Operating and Loading Section
    - Support Battalion
      - Guard and Military Police Company
      - Human Resources Support Office
      - CBRN-Defence Section
      - Search and Rescue Section
      - National Training Reception and Preparation Support Group
    - Base Operations Battalion
      - Logistics Squadron
      - Warehouses
  - 86th Helicopter Brigade "József Kiss", at Szolnok Air Base
    - Base Operations Center
    - Combat Helicopter Battalion; with Mi-24V/P attack helicopters (being replaced with armed H145M helicopters)
    - Transport Helicopter Battalion; with H225M helicopters
    - Special Air Operations Squadron; with H145M and H225M helicopters
    - Operations Support Battalion
    - Aviation Maintenance Battalion
    - Logistics Battalion
  - 101st Aviation Brigade "Dezső Szentgyörgyi", at Kecskemét Air Base
    - Base Operations Center
    - Tactical Fighter Squadron; with 12× JAS 39C Gripen and 2× JAS 39D Gripen (4× additional JAS 39C Gripen on order)
    - Transport Aircraft Squadron; with 2× Airbus A319, 2× Dassault Falcon 7X, 1× Embraer KC-390 (1× additional KC-390 on order)
    - Tactical Training Squadron; with 6× Zlin Z–242L, 2× Zlín Z–143LSi, 3× L-39 Skyfox (9× more on order) trainer aircraft)
    - Air Combat and Operations Support Battalion
    - Operations Support Battalion
    - Aviation Maintenance Battalion
    - Logistics Battalion
  - 205th Air Defence Missile Regiment "Tibor Dánielfy", in Győr
    - Air Defence Missile and Operations Center
    - 1st Air Defence Missile Battalion, in Isaszeg; with NASAMS 3 surface-to-air missile systems
    - 2nd Air Defence Missile Battalion; with Mistral short range air defence systems
    - Logistic Battalion
    - Weapons Training and Simulation Center

==== Special Operations Command ====
- Special Operations Command, at Szolnok Air Base
  - 1st Special Operations Brigade "Árpád Bertalan", at Szolnok Air Base
    - Until 2023 the brigade consisted of the 34th Special Forces Battalion "László Bercsényi" and 88th Light Mixed Battalion. Since then the brigade's organization has been reformed and the organization has not yet been disclosed.

==== Cyber Operations Command ====
- Cyber Operations Command, in Szentendre
  - Cyber and Information Operations Center, in Szentendre
    - Information Analysis and Evaluation
    - Operations Planning
    - Operations (Stationary and Maneuver Elements)
    - Operations Support
    - Training and Exercise Support

==== Logistic Support Command ====
- Logistic Support Command, in Budapest
  - Materiel Supply Warehouse Base, in Budapest
  - 2nd Supply Regiment "György Lahner", in Kaposvár
    - Transport battalion
    - National Support Battalion
    - Movement Control Company
    - 1st Training, Education and Regeneration Center, in Badacsonylábdi
  - Training Area Command "Böszörményi Géza", in Várpalota
    - National Training and Simulation Center
    - Bakonykút Training Base Bakonykúti
    - Hajmáskér Training Base Hajmáskér
    - Camp Village Training Base Táborfalva
    - Újdörögd Training Base Újdörögd
    - Opposing Force Company
    - Logistics Company
  - Szentendre Garrison Support Command, in Szentendre
  - Recreation, Training and Conference Center, in Balatonakarattya

==== Transformation Command ====
- Transformation Command, in Szentendre
  - Hungarian Defence Forces Academy, in Szentendre
  - Non-commissioned Officer Academy, in Szentendre
  - Military Training Center, at Szolnok Air Base

==== Territorial Defence and Auxiliary Command ====
- Territorial Defence and Auxiliary Command, in Budapest
  - 1st Territorial Defence Regiment "László Reviczky", in Gödöllő
    - Headquarters and Staff, in Gödöllő
    - 1st Territorial Defence Battalion "János Horváth" (Budapest I.), in Gödöllő
    - 29th Territorial Defence Battalion "István Jónás" (Budapest II.), in Gödöllő
    - 30th Territorial Defence Battalion "András Szepessy" (Pest County), in Gödöllő
  - 2nd Territorial Defence Regiment "Antal Vattay", in Nyíregyháza
    - Headquarters and Staff, in Nyíregyháza
    - 3rd Territorial Defence Battalion "Sándor Oláh" (Hajdú–Bihar County), in Debrecen
    - 5th Territorial Defence Battalion "Gyula Farkas" (Szabolcs–Szatmár–Bereg County), in Nyíregyháza
    - 10th Territorial Defence Battalion "Károly Majthényi" (Borsod–Abaúj–Zemplén County), in Miskolc
  - 3rd Territorial Defence Regiment "Lajos Krause", in Szolnok
    - Headquarters and Staff, in Szolnok
    - 25th Territorial Defence Battalion "János Széplaki" (Nógrád County), in Salgótarján
    - 60th Territorial Defence Battalion "József Mike" (Heves County), in Eger
    - 68th Territorial Defence Battalion "Dezső Horgos" (Jász–Nagykun–Szolnok County), in Szolnok
  - 4th Territorial Defence Regiment "Miksa Dombay", in Szeged
    - Headquarters and Staff, in Szeged
    - 38th Territorial Defence Battalion "Mihály Merász" (Bács-Kiskun County), in Kecskemét
    - 46th Territorial Defence Battalion "Géza Heim" (Csongrád-Csanád County), in Szeged
    - 101st Territorial Defence Battalion "Imre Fekete" (Békés County), in Békéscsaba
  - 5th Territorial Defence Regiment "Gyula Bauer", in Kaposvár
    - Headquarters and Staff, in Kaposvár
    - 44th Territorial Defence Battalion "József Adorján" (Somogy County), in Kaposvár
    - 48th Territorial Defence Battalion "Sándor Nagy" (Zala County), in Nagykanizsa
    - 52nd Territorial Defence Battalion "Kornél Oszlányi" (Baranya County), in Pécs
  - 6th Territorial Defence Regiment "Gyula Sipos", in Székesfehérvár
    - Headquarters and Staff, in Székesfehérvár
    - 12th Territorial Defence Battalion "Jenő Hajnal" (Komárom-Esztergom County), in Komárom
    - 17th Territorial Defence Battalion "Gyula Pour" (Fejér County), in Székesfehérvár
    - 69th Territorial Defence Battalion "József Horváth" (Tolna County), in Szekszárd
  - 7th Territorial Defence Regiment "Kálmán Klempa", in Győr
    - Headquarters and Staff, in Győr
    - 19th Territorial Defence Battalion "Ferenc Szalontai" (Győr–Moson–Sopron County), in Győr
    - 31st Territorial Defence Battalion "Ferenc Draganits" (Veszprém County), in Veszprém
    - 83rd Territorial Defence Battalion "Emil Poppr" (Vas County), in Szombathely

==== Budapest Garrison Brigade ====
- Budapest Garrison Brigade "Sándor Szurmay", in Budapest
  - 32nd Guards Regiment
  - Hussar Group (Division) "Count Ferenc Nádasdy"
  - Support Battalion
  - Transport Battalion
  - Maintenance Company
  - Hungarian Defence Forces Central Military Band
  - Operations and Training Support Department

==== 51st Command and Signals Brigade ====
- 51st Command and Signals Brigade "József Nagysándor", in Székesfehérvár
  - Command Support Company, in Székesfehérvár
  - National Information Communications Center, in Budapest
  - Transdanubian Information Communications Center, in Székesfehérvár
  - Great Plain Information Communications Center, in Szolnok
  - Information Technology Center, in Székesfehérvár
  - Electronic Signature Verification Center, in Veszprém
  - Information Protection Center, in Székesfehérvár
  - Deployable Information Communications Battalion, in Székesfehérvár
  - Logistics Battalion, in Székesfehérvár
  - Multinational Division Central (MND-C) Support Element, in Székesfehérvár

==== Military Police Regiment ====
- Military Police Regiment, in Budapest
  - Object Protection Company, in Budapest
  - Object Protection Company, in Veszprém
  - Object Protection Company, in Székesfehérvár
  - Military Police Company, in Budapest
    - Military Police Platoon, in Debrecen
    - Military Police Platoon, in Szolnok
    - Military Police Platoon, in Hódmezővásárhely
    - Military Police Platoon, in Kaposvár
    - Military Police Platoon, in Székesfehérvár
    - Military Police Platoon, in Győr

== Hungarian Defence Forces organization graphic ==
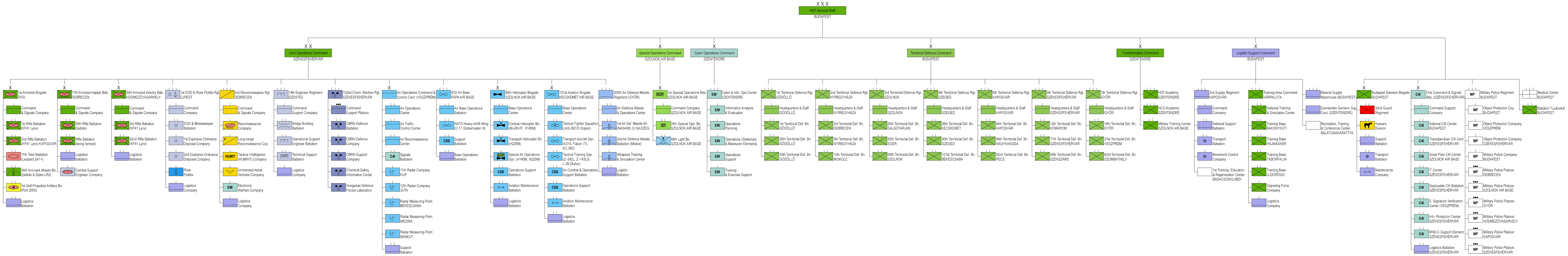
Hungarian Defence Forces organization as of September 2025 (click image to enlarge)

== Geographic distribution of operational units ==
Hungarian Defence Forces Combat Command locations 2018:
Brigade HQs and infantry units Reconnaissance units Engineer units Special Forces Signal units NBC-Defence units CIMIC/PSYOPS Logistic units
Air Bases: JAS-39C/D Gripen Helicopters other flying units Air Operations/Radar

== Specific unit details ==
=== 32nd Guard Regiment ===
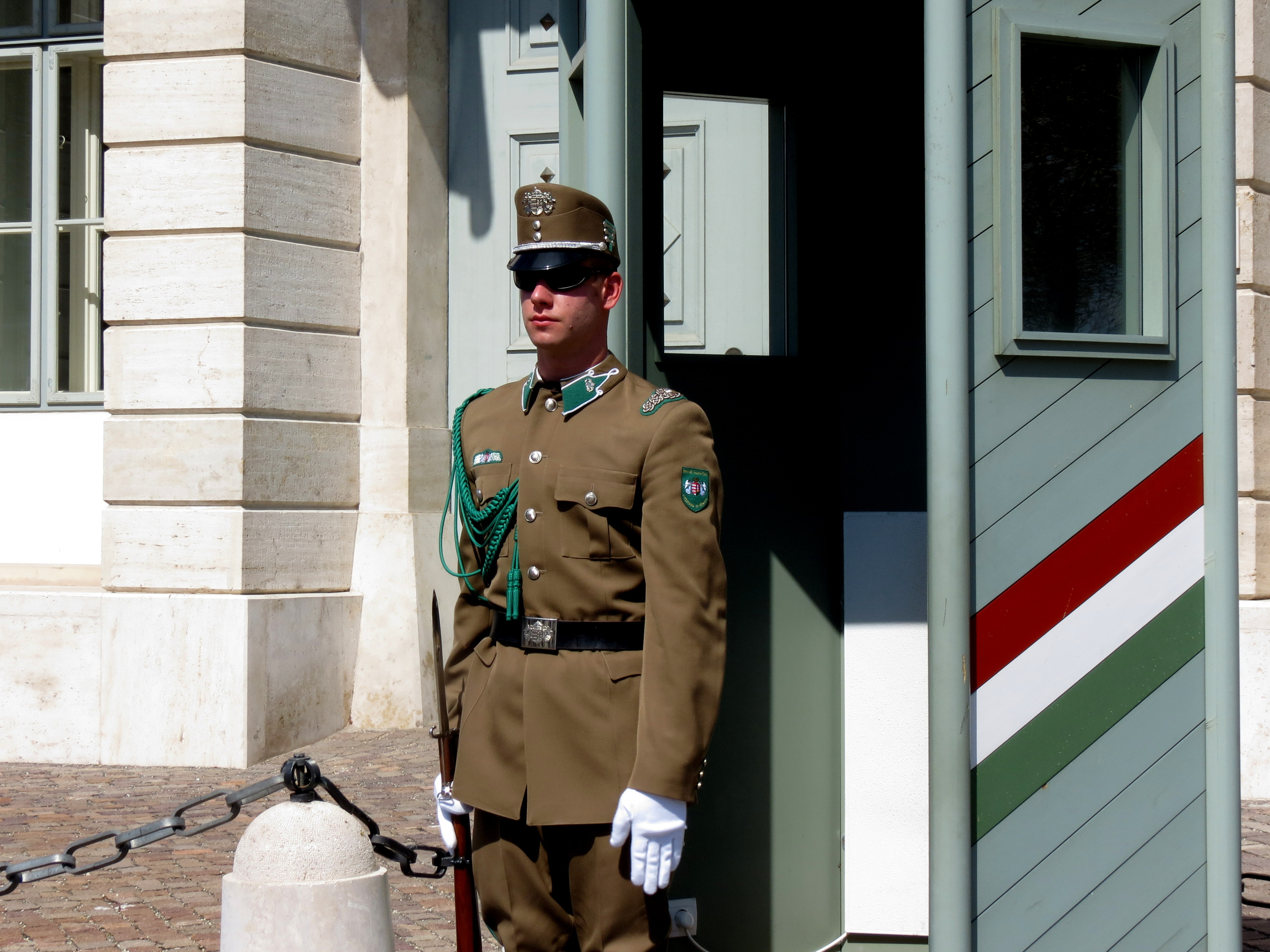
A guard at Sándor Palace in 2013

External videos
- Díszzászlóalj 1990.
- Mozaik – Díszelgő egységek főpróbája (2015.03.16)

The 32nd National Home Defence Ceremonial Regiment (32. Nemzeti Honvéd Díszegység) has been the official Guard of honour unit of the HDF, from 1 January 2011. It took over the protocol duties from the former Ceremonial Battalion (Honvéd Díszzászlóalj) which was founded in 2007 and that was in turn preceded by the 32nd Budapest Guard and Ceremonial Regiment (MH 32. Budapest Őr- és Díszezred), which traced back until 1991.

This ceremonial unit takes part in the welcoming of foreign dignitaries to Budapest. Furthermore, it mounts the Sándor Palace Guard, the Hungarian Parliament Guard and the Holy Crown Guard. The battalion has also a mounted detachment, clad in historical green-red hussars uniforms.

The official ceremonial honour guard of the Hungarian People's Republic was the 7015th Ceremonial Regiment of the Hungarian People's Army (Hungarian: Magyar Néphadsereg 7015 Dísz -és őrezred).

=== HDF Central Band ===
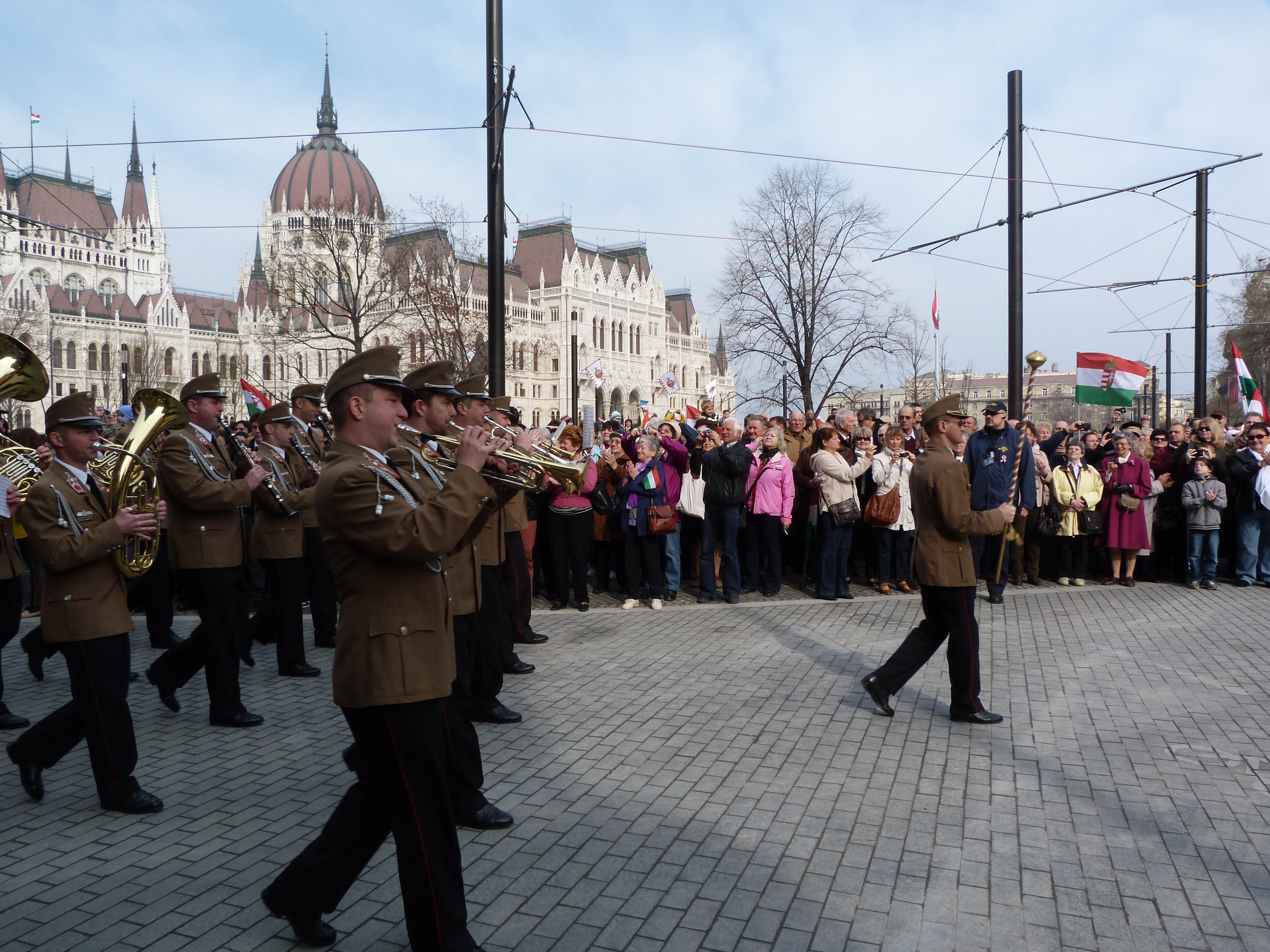
The band at a parade in 2014

The Hungarian Defence Forces Central Military Band (Magyar Honvédség Központi Zenekar) is the representative musical ensemble of the HDF. Although it was officially founded in 1962, its history goes back to 1896, when the first Hungarian military band of music was established in Budapest. Today, the Central Band maintains a fanfare unit as well as a drum corps. The primary task of the Central Band is to take part in national, military, and protocol events. Other activities include cultivation of Hungarian soldiers and wind-music traditions, the promotion and amateur brass bands. The Central Band is a regular participant in international and domestic festivals, and nearly a dozen CDs of performances by the Central Band have been published.
