= 32nd Budapest Guard and Ceremonial Regiment =

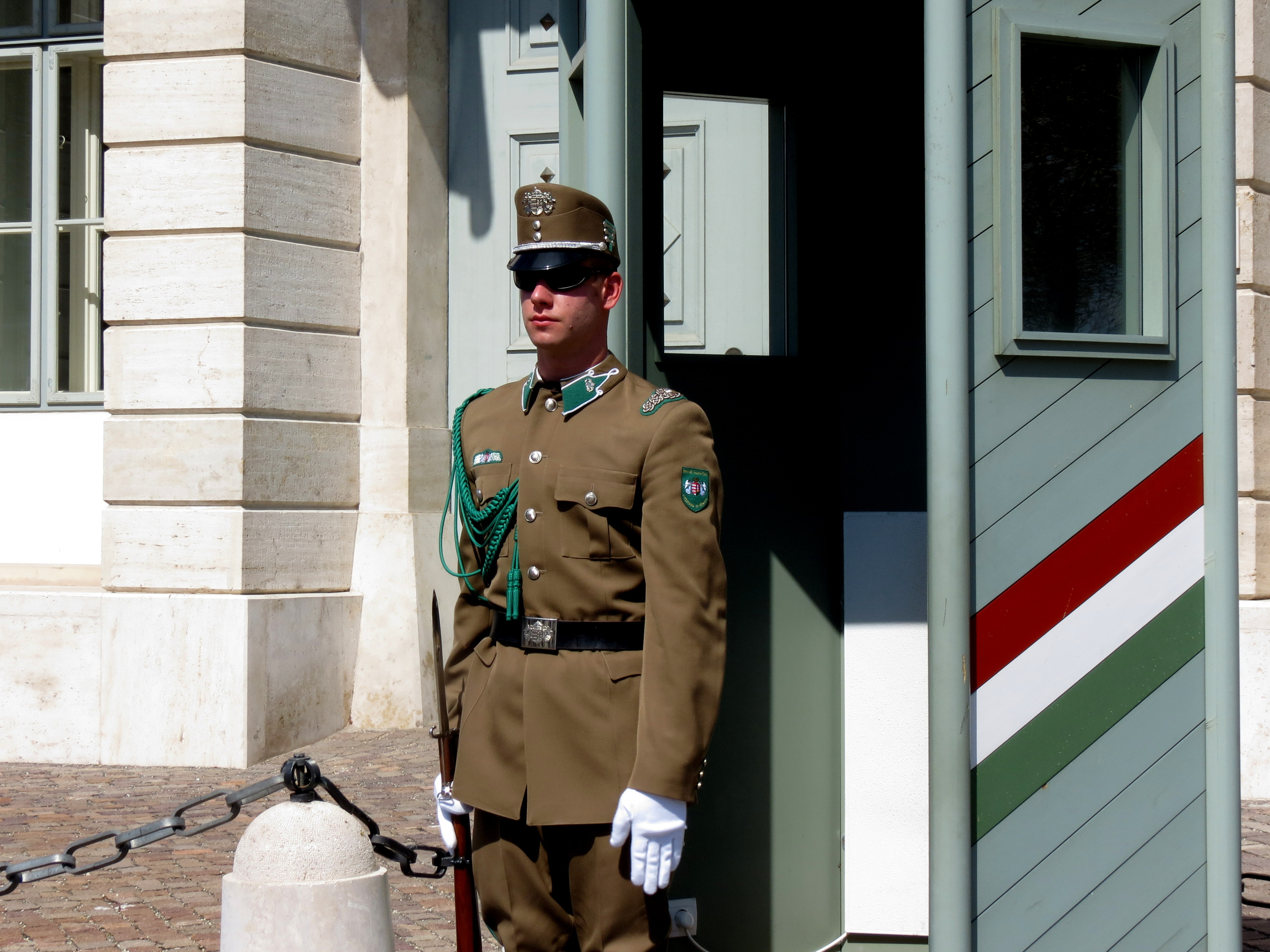
A guard at Sándor Palace in 2013.

The 32nd Budapest Guard and Ceremonial Regiment (Hungarian: MH 32. Budapest Őr- és Díszezred) of the Hungarian Defence Forces is a ceremonial infantry unit in the Hungarian military, headquartered in the capital of Budapest. It is under the direct supervision of Budapest Garrison Brigade "Vitéz Sándor Szurmay" of the HDF General Staff. Aside from its ceremonial duties, the soldiers of the regiment, along with its historical predecessors, have been involved in 14 wars, 135 battles, and 6 United Nations and NATO missions.

== Organization ==
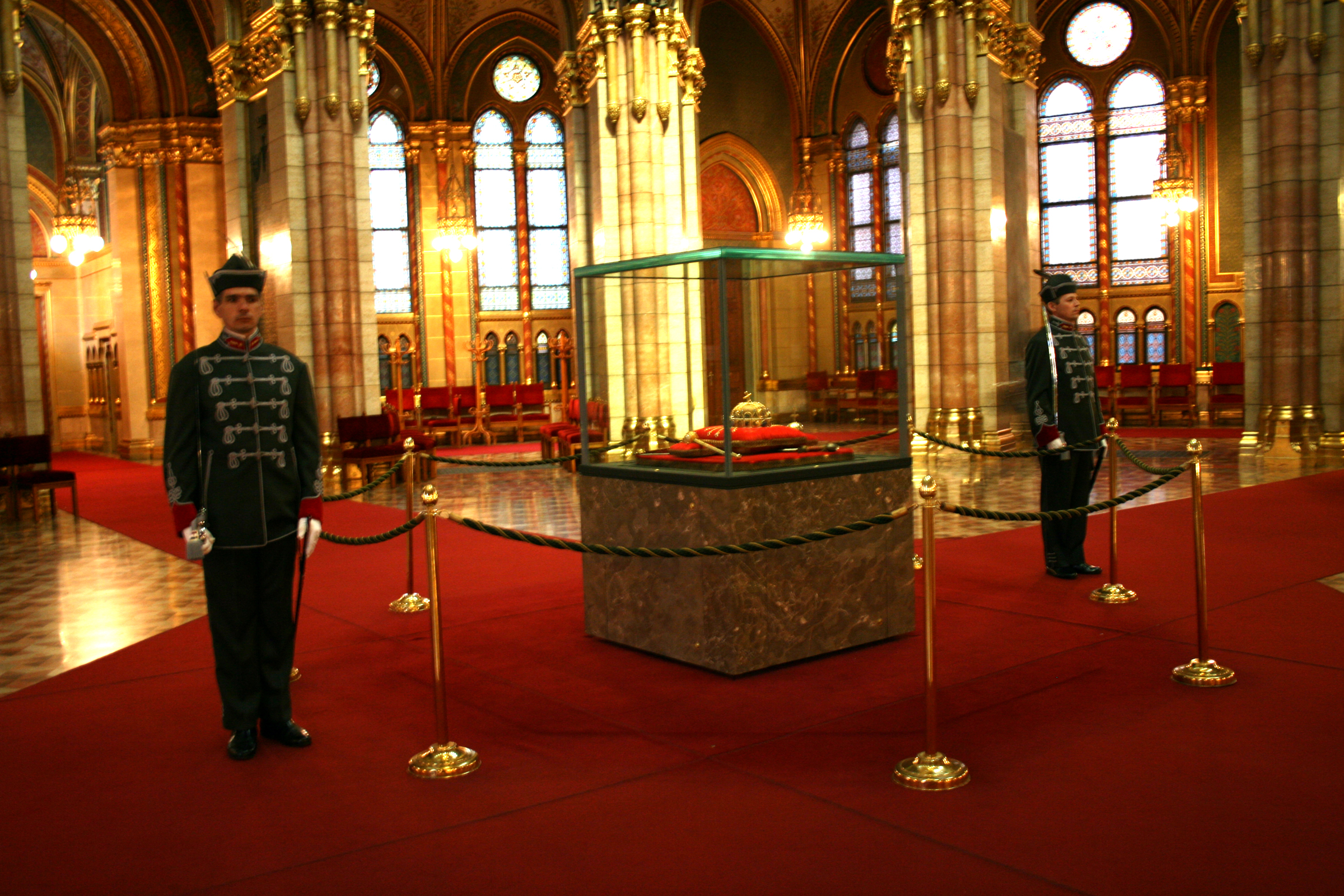
The Holy Crown Guard

The regiment currently consists of the following subunits:

- Sándor Palace Guard
- Crown Guard
- Protocol Battalion
- Support Battalion
  - Technical Staff
  - Logistics Unit

They are supported by the following command elements:

- Operations and Training Directorate
- Logistics Directorate
- News and IT Directorate
- Information Protection Directorate
- HR Directorate
- Directorate for Legal and Administrative Affairs
- Safety Subdivision
- Directorate of Health
- Financial Department

The headquarters is currently in Budapest. All serviceman in the regiment must meet the minimum requirement of 180 cm (5 ft 11 in).

== History ==
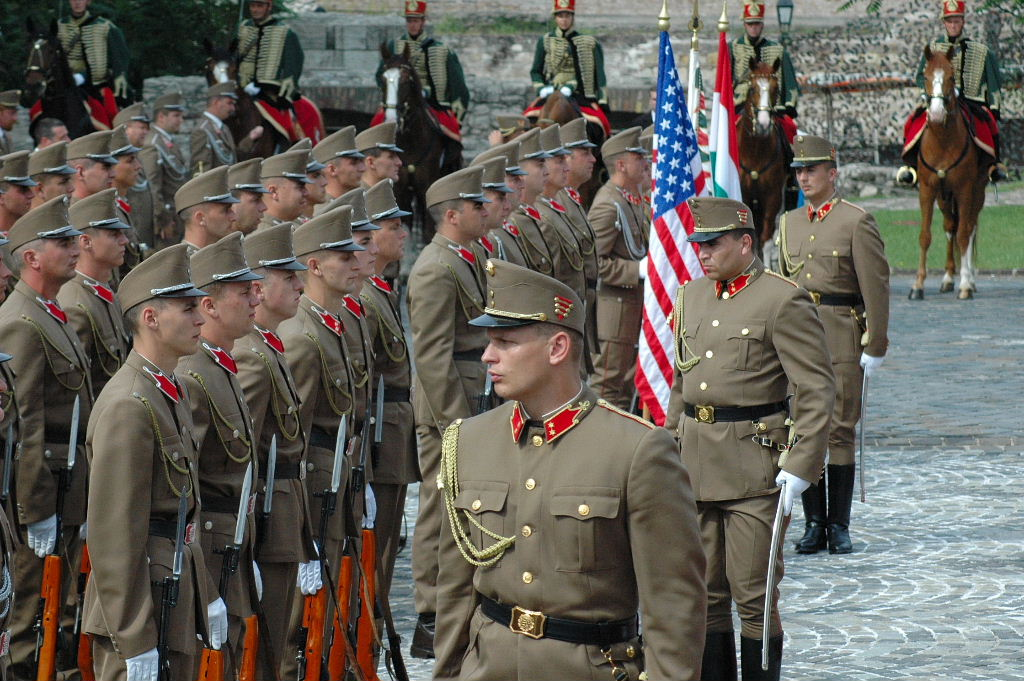
The regiment during the welcoming of President George W. Bush on 22 June 2006.

It was the Hungarian People's Army's 7015th Ceremonial Regiment (Hungarian: Magyar Néphadsereg 7015 Dísz -és őrezred), being at the time the official honor guard and escort of the leadership of the Hungarian People's Republic. The regiment took the name of the 32nd Budapest Guard Regiment on 15 May 1991 by order of Hungarian Minister of Defence Lajos Für. On 1 October 2000, the regiment was named the 32nd Budapest Guard and Ornament. As of 1 January 2002, as part of the force reform, the organizational structure of the regiment changed. A support battalion was formed from the two independent centuries and divisions from the logistics headquarters.

On New Year's Day in 2003, Colonel László Talpas became the first and last commander of the regiment, having previously completed the Military Observer Training Course in 1998 and serving in the United Nations International Mission in Western Sahara in 2000. It operated until 31 December 2006, at which time it was disbanded to be replaced by the Ceremonial Battalion branch (part of the MH "Támogató Dandár" HDF Support Brigade) on 1 January 2007. In the course of this, members of the regiment took part in many HDF operations and assignments overseas. It was converted on 1 January 2011 to Nemzeti Honvéd Díszegység (National Home Defense Ceremonial Regiment) as part of the MH TD and achieved service on 25 April.

The decision to re-establish the Holy Crown Guard was made on 20 December 2010 (based on the 1928 Act) with support from the Hungarian Crown Guard Association. On 30 May 2011, due to the resurgence of traditions, the Holy Crown Guard was reestablished and took over the right to protect the Holy Crown again after 66 years (it was last performed in 1944 by members of the Hungarian Royal Crown Guard).

== Regimental customs and tradition ==
=== Dress uniform ===
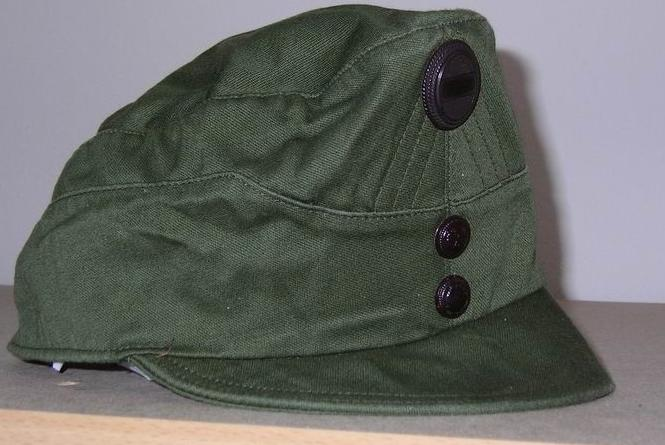
Modern Hungarian army ski cap

In 1949, a new uniform was introduced, which was similar to the Soviet pattern and molded to honor Hungarian traditions. In 1960, a cotton uniform was introduced. In 1990, a new tunic and other garments were introduced to the tradition that existed in the Horthy era, but was later modified to avoid fascist comparisons. For a time, a green field uniform was used in the unit until a brown full dress uniform was introduced in the early 2000s. During the changing of the guard, members of the guard wear sunglasses while the ceremony is occurring as well as on guard duty.

Since 1990, the guard has worn a native Ski cap known as a Bocskai. Prior to the introduction of this, the unit used a Peaked cap similar to the Soviet model beginning in 1958 with the communist emblem on top. It is named after the Crown of Stephen Bocskai, given to the Sultan of the Ottoman Empire to Prince Stephen Bocskai of Transylvania in the 17th century.

=== Musical support ===
Being the representative musical ensemble of the HDF, the Hungarian Defense Forces Central Military Band support the regiment musically during protocol events. Being part of the same garrison brigade gives the regiment and the band direct access to each other. Today, the Central Band maintains a fanfare unit as well as a drum corps. The band wears the same uniform as the regiment.

=== Regimental memorial ===
The 32nd Infantry Regiment Memorial (32. Gyalogsági ezred Emlékmű) is located on Baross Street in the Józsefváros District of Budapest. The memorial honors the ethnically Hungarian 32nd Infantry Regiment of the Royal Hungarian Honvéd of the Austro-Hungarian Army based in Dés (now Dej, Romania). The memorial was chosen due to the mere fact that bot units bear the same unit number, 32. It was erected in 1933 after a public donation by István Szentgyörgyi to honor the members of the regiment who served in the First World War. It depicts a soldier in a helmet carrying a grenade in his right hand while holding a bayonet rifle in the left.

=== Marching style ===
Color guards from the regiment are the only ones who perform a full goose step in slow time during military ceremonies. A modified goose step is performed by the rest of the unit, with the foot raised only a few inches off the ground. In quick time, the unit marches in a similar fashion to the United States Army and the British Army. They usually goosestep while their rifles are in their trademark sling arms position while march regularly when their rifles are sloped.

== Guard mounting ceremony ==
The regiment has provided sentries at the gates of the Sándor Palace (the official residence of the President of Hungary) in Budapest in a Guard mounting ceremony since the Hungarian People's Republic's disestablishment in 1989 and President Ferenc Mádl's move in the palace in 2003. The sentries come at 12 pm in a team of six while only two them will actually take up the guard. A drummer and officer are also present. Another guard changing ceremony is held inside the Domed Hall of the Hungarian Parliament Building on Kossuth Square, where guards protect the Holy Crown of Hungary. This has been done since 20 August 2012.

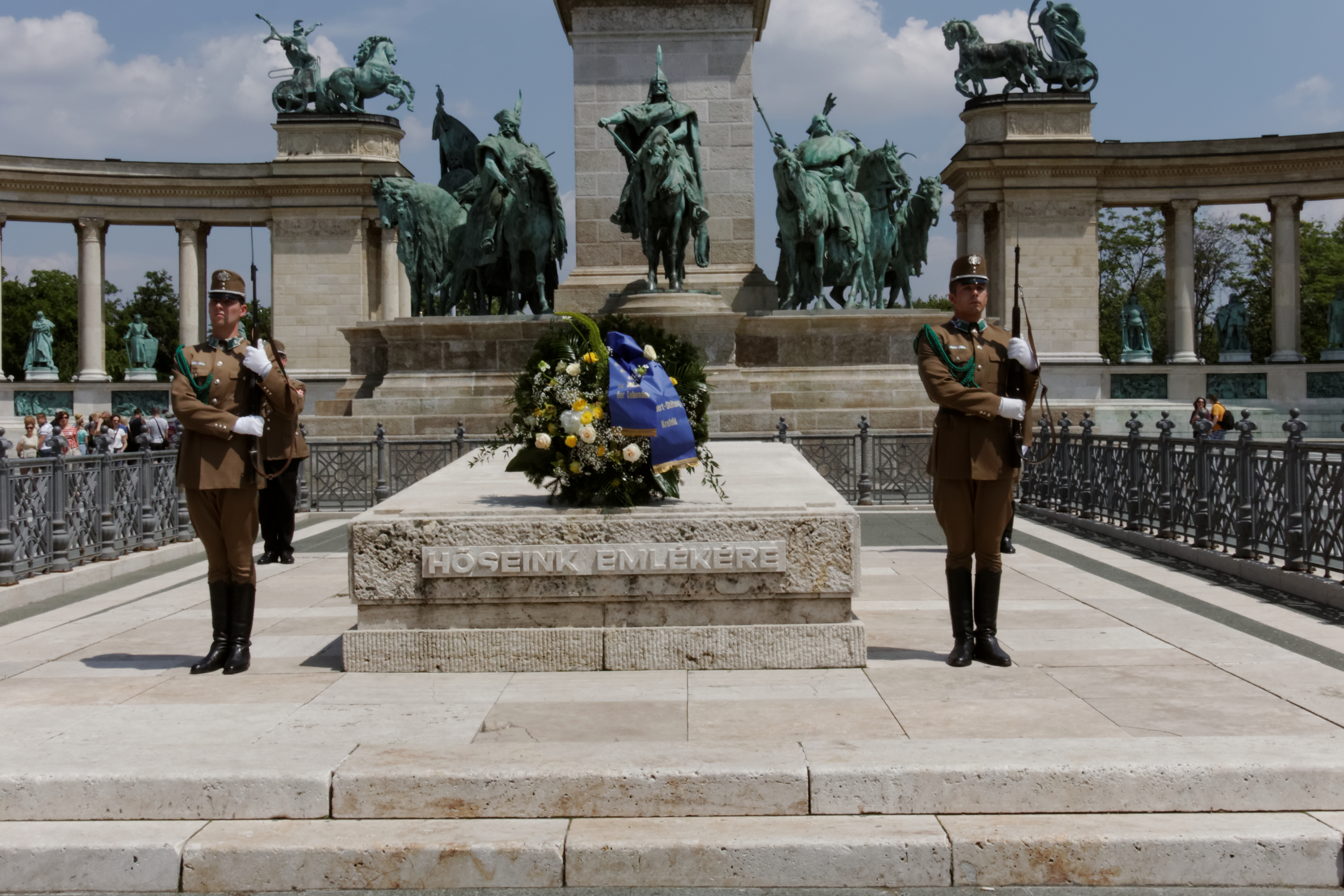
The guard at the Tomb of the Unknown Soldier

Public duties by the regiment are also provided by a four-man team at the Tomb of the Unknown Soldier at the Millennium Monument on Hősök tere (Heroes Square) with the tradition beginning in the communist era during the HPA's 7015th Ceremonial Regiment tenure as chief ceremonial unit. This usually happened between 15 March and 23 October (both dates are Hungary's National Day), during which it stood permanent guard on the square.

== Other duties ==
The regiment takes part in many events related to the following Hungarian public holidays:

- National Day (15 March and 23 October)
- National Defense Day (21 May)
- Heroes' Day (31 May)
- State Foundation Day (20 August)

In also participates in the following professional activities:

- State Funerals
- State visits ny foreign leaders to the capital.
- Rednering honors for the President, the Prime Minister of Hungary, the Minister of Defence and the Chief of General Staff
- The presentation of credentials of ambassadors of foreign countries and organizations
- Participates in military parades of the HDF

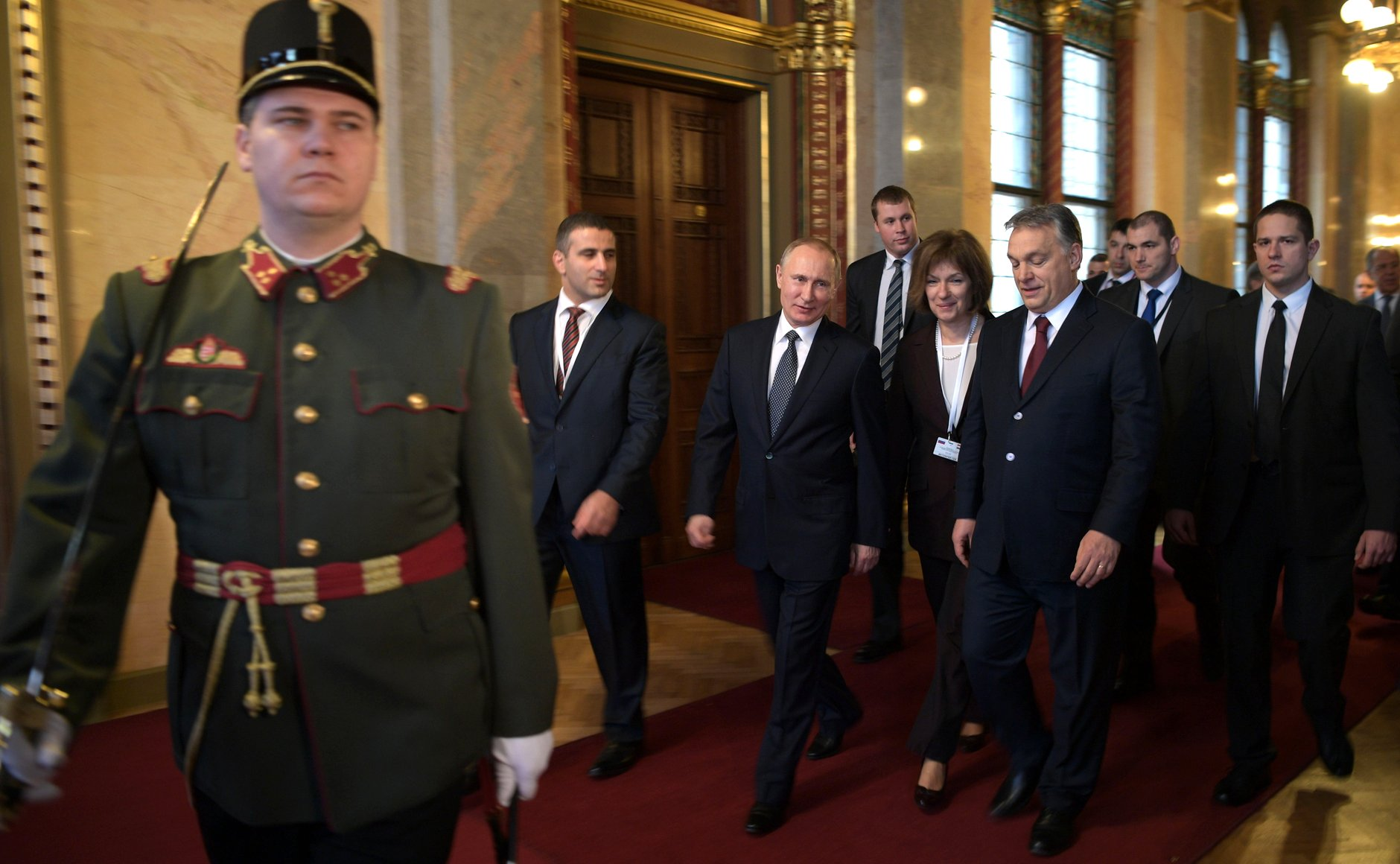
An officer of the regiment escorting Vladimir Putin and Viktor Orban through the halls of Parliament in 2017.

Outside of Hungary, the regiment also performs exhibition drill at military tattoos and marches in military parades (mostly in NATO allied countries). In 2019, a detachment from the regiment took part in the yearly 3 May Constitution Day parade in Warsaw, Poland. It also previously took part in the 2007 and 2014 Bastille Day military parade in Paris as well as the 2011 Festa della Repubblica in Rome, Italy.

== See also ==
- Gardebataillon
- Serbian Guards Unit
- Honor Guard Battalion (Croatia)
- Slovenian Guards Unit
- Michael the Brave 30th Guards Brigade
- Honour Guard of the President of the Slovak Republic
- Kyiv Presidential Honor Guard Battalion
