= Samu Hazai =

Hungarian politician (1851–1942)

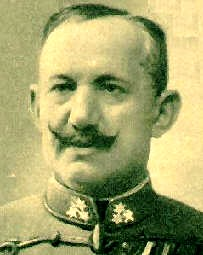
- Born: 26 December 1851; Rimaszombat, Kingdom of Hungary, Austrian Empire
- Died: 10 February 1942 (aged 90); Budapest, Hungary
- Military career
- Allegiance: Austria-Hungary
- Service years: 1873–1918
- Rank: Colonel General
- Commands: Forty-sixth Infantry Regiment
- Conflicts: World War I
- Awards: Order of the Iron Crown, Order of Leopold

Baron Samu Hazai (German: Samuel Freiherr von Hazai; 26 December 1851 – 10 February 1942) was a Hungarian military officer and politician of Jewish origin, who served as Minister of Defence of Hungary between 1910 and 1917.

== Decorations and awards ==
- Military Merit Medal in bronze (Austria-Hungary, March 1900) - for his services as an instructor.
- Order of the Iron Crown, 3rd class (Austria, June 1904) - for his services in the military training
- Knight's Cross of the Order of Leopold (Austria, 10 April 1908)
- Grand Cross of the Order of Military Merit (Spain, 1909)
- Order of the Red Eagle, 1st class (Prussia, 1910)
- Order of Prince Danilo I, 1st class (Montenegro, 1910)
- Appointment to the Privy Council (December 1910)
- Order of the Iron Crown, 1st class (12 August 1913)
- Military Merit Cross, 1st class with war decoration (Austria-Hungary, 3 February 1915)
- Star of the Decoration of Honour for Services to the Red Cross (1915)
- Iron Cross of 1914, 1st and 2nd class (Prussia, 1915)
- Grand Cross of the Military Merit with Swords (Bavaria, 1915)
- Grand Cross of the Order of Leopold (June 1916); war decoration added on 10 August 1916
- Large Military Merit Medal in Gold (25 November 1916)
- Grand Cross of the Order of the Crown (Württemberg, 1916)
- Grand Cross with swords and golden star of the Albert Order, (Saxony, 1916)
- Order of the Medjidie, 1st class (Ottoman Empire, 1917)
- Gallipoli Star ("Iron Crescent", Ottoman Empire, 1917)
- Imtiyaz Medal in Gold (Ottoman Empire, 1917)
- Military Merit Cross, 3rd class with war decoration in diamonds (Austria-Hungary, 12 August 1918)

Political offices
Preceded by Lajos Jekelfalussy	Minister of Defence; 1910–1917	Succeeded by Sándor Szurmay
