= Hungarian Defense Forces Central Military Band =

Hungarian military band

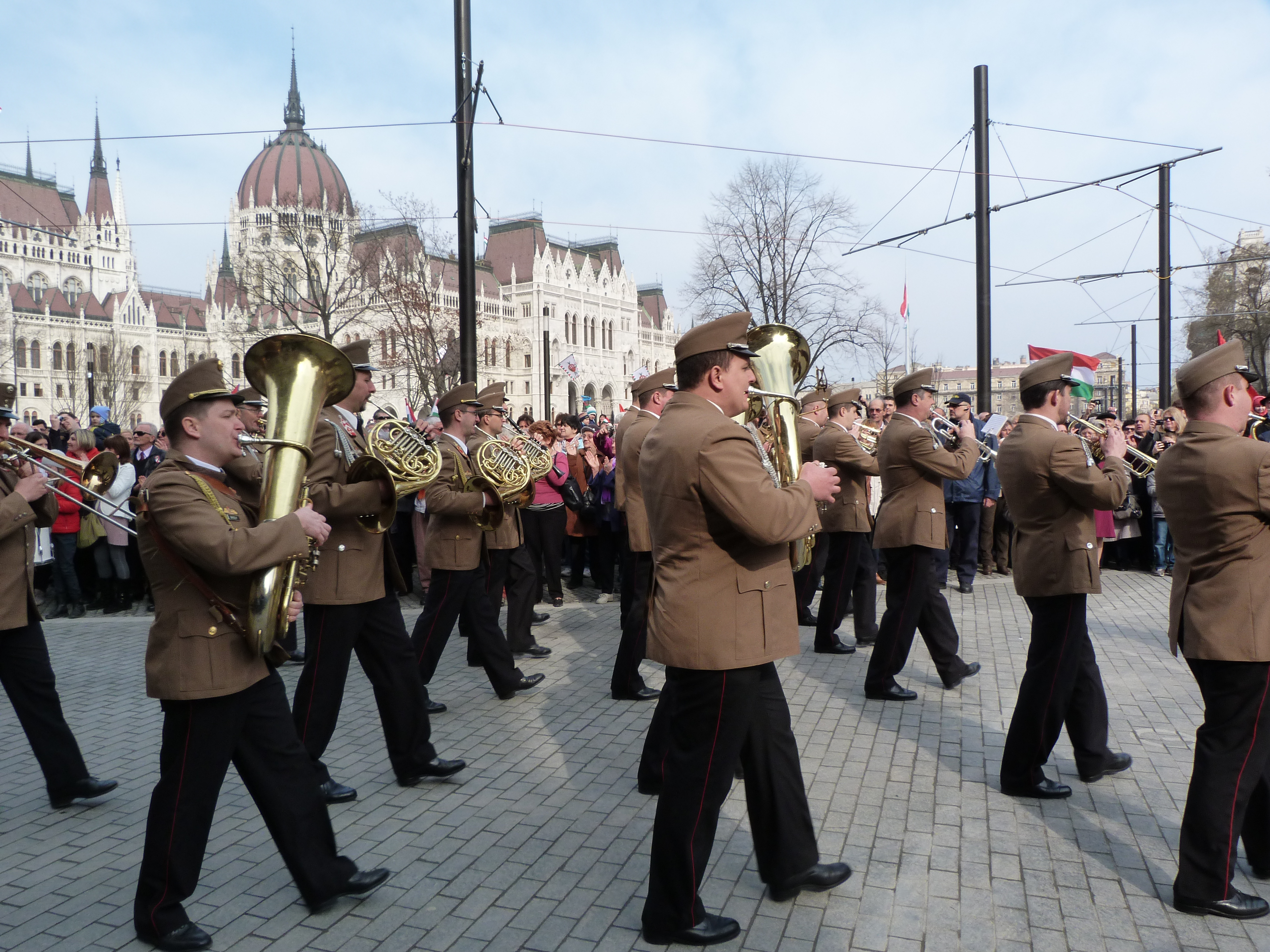
The band marching in Kossuth Square during a 2014 parade of marching bands in Budapest

The Hungarian Defense Forces Central Military Band (HDF Central Band) (Magyar Honvédség Központi Zenekar) is the official military band of the Hungarian Defence Forces, the national army of Hungary. It has represented the Military of Hungary in the realm of ceremonies for over 40 years. The central band also acts as the headquarters, administrative, and instructional unit for all separate garrison bands in the country. One of the smaller bands that are sported by the HDF Central Band is the National Home Defense Ceremonial Band of the 32nd Budapest Guard and Ceremonial Regiment.

== History ==
Although it was officially founded in 1962, its history goes back to 1896, when the first Hungarian military band of music was established in Budapest. At the time of its founding, it was the official band of the Hungarian People's Army. After the fall of communism in 1989, as well as the fall of the USSR in 1991, the band was reformatted to match military bands of the European Union and NATO countries, two organizations that Hungary would eventually be a member of.

== Tasks ==
The primary task of the HDF Central Band is to take part in national, military, and protocol events. Other activities include cultivation of Hungarian soldiers and wind-music traditions, the promotion and amateur brass bands. The Central Band is a regular participant in international and domestic festivals, and nearly a dozen CDs of performances by the Central Band have been published. It performs pieces such as the Rákóczi March and the Klapka Induló. The band's uniform is similar to the uniform of the 32nd National Honor Guard Battalion which the premier ceremonial unit of the HDF.

== Structure ==
As of 2020, the HDF Central Band maintains a fanfare unit and a corps of drums in its ranks. The current conductor of the HDF Central Band is Colonel Zsolt Csizmadia, who is the director of all military bands in the country. It is a directly reporting unit of the Budapest Garrison Brigade "Vitéz Sándor Szurmay".

== Public holidays and observances covered by the band ==
| Date | English name | Hungarian name | Descriptions of event holiday with the band |
|---|---|---|---|
| 15 March | National Day | Nemzeti ünnep | |
| 4 April | Liberation Day | Felszabadítási Nap | Formerly performed during the HPA military parade in Budapest. Today it performs at local festivities and wreath laying at monuments. |
| 21 May | National Defense Day | Honvédelmi nap | |
| 31 May | Heroes' Day | Hősök napja | |
| 20 August | State Foundation Day | Az államalapítás ünnepe | |
| 23 October | National Day | Nemzeti ünnep | |

== Gallery ==
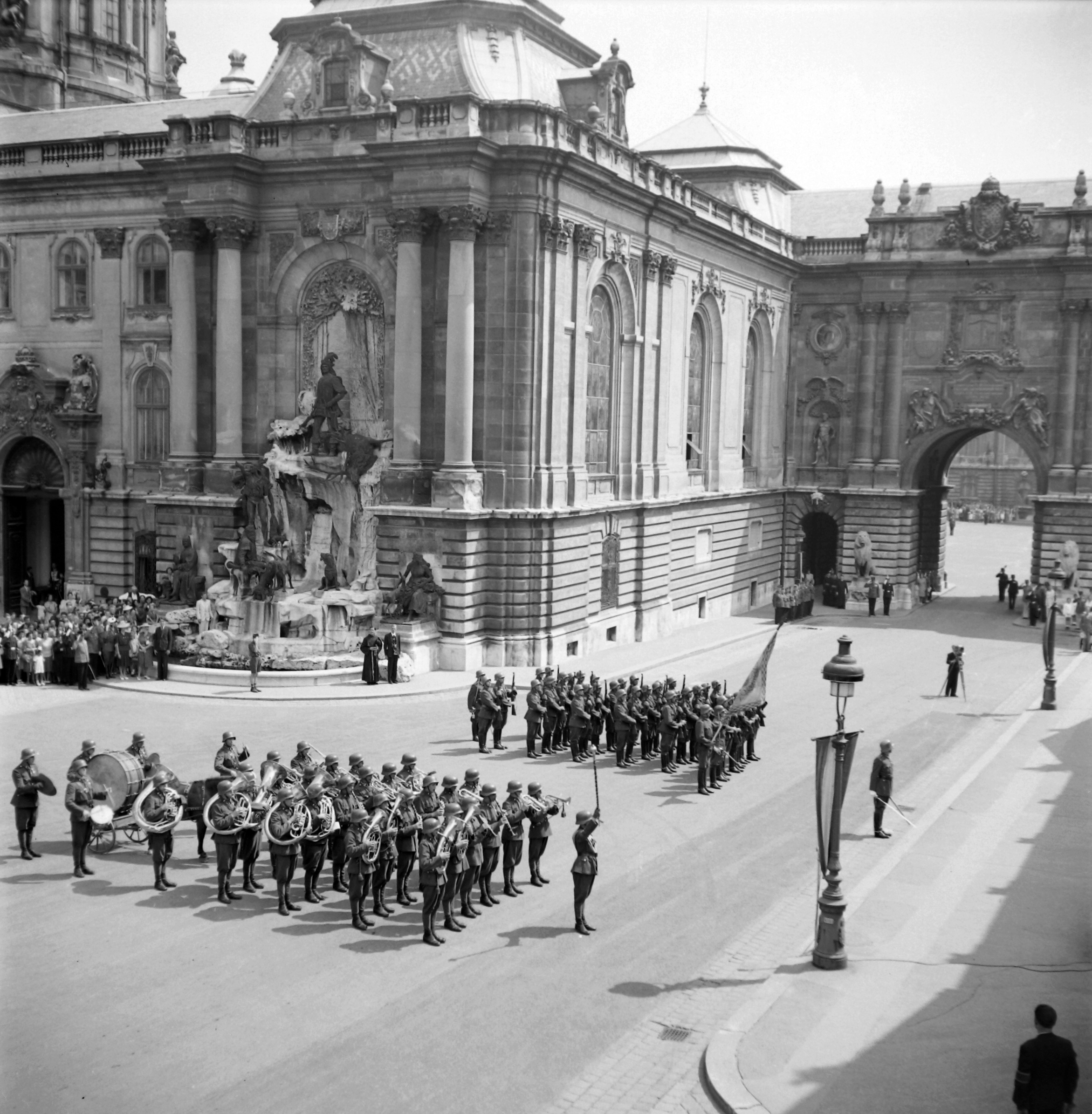
The band in 1938, when it was at the time under the authority of the Kingdom of Hungary (1920–1946).

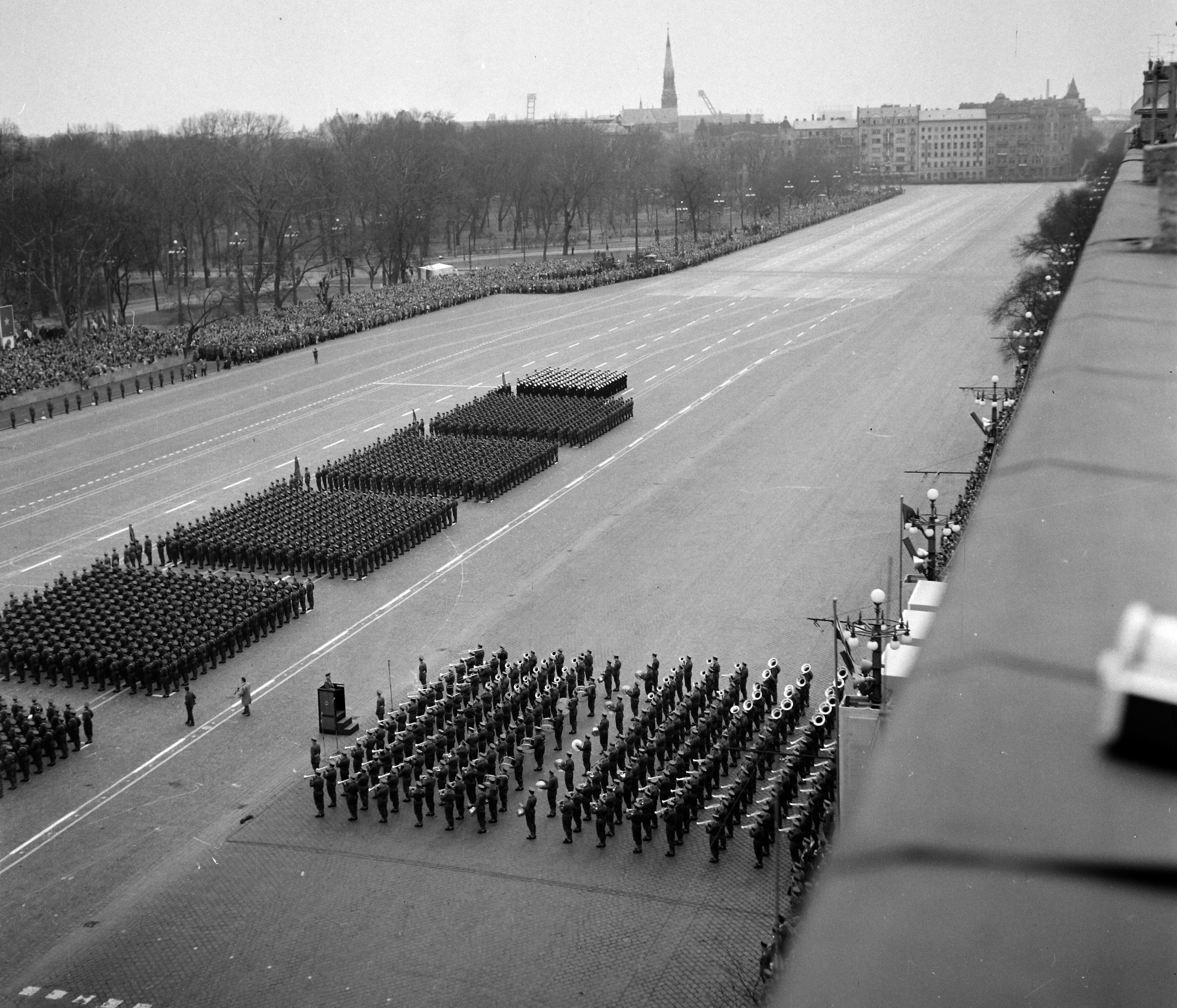
The massed bands of the Hungarian People's Army at a Liberation Day parade in Budapest in 1964, two years after its creation.

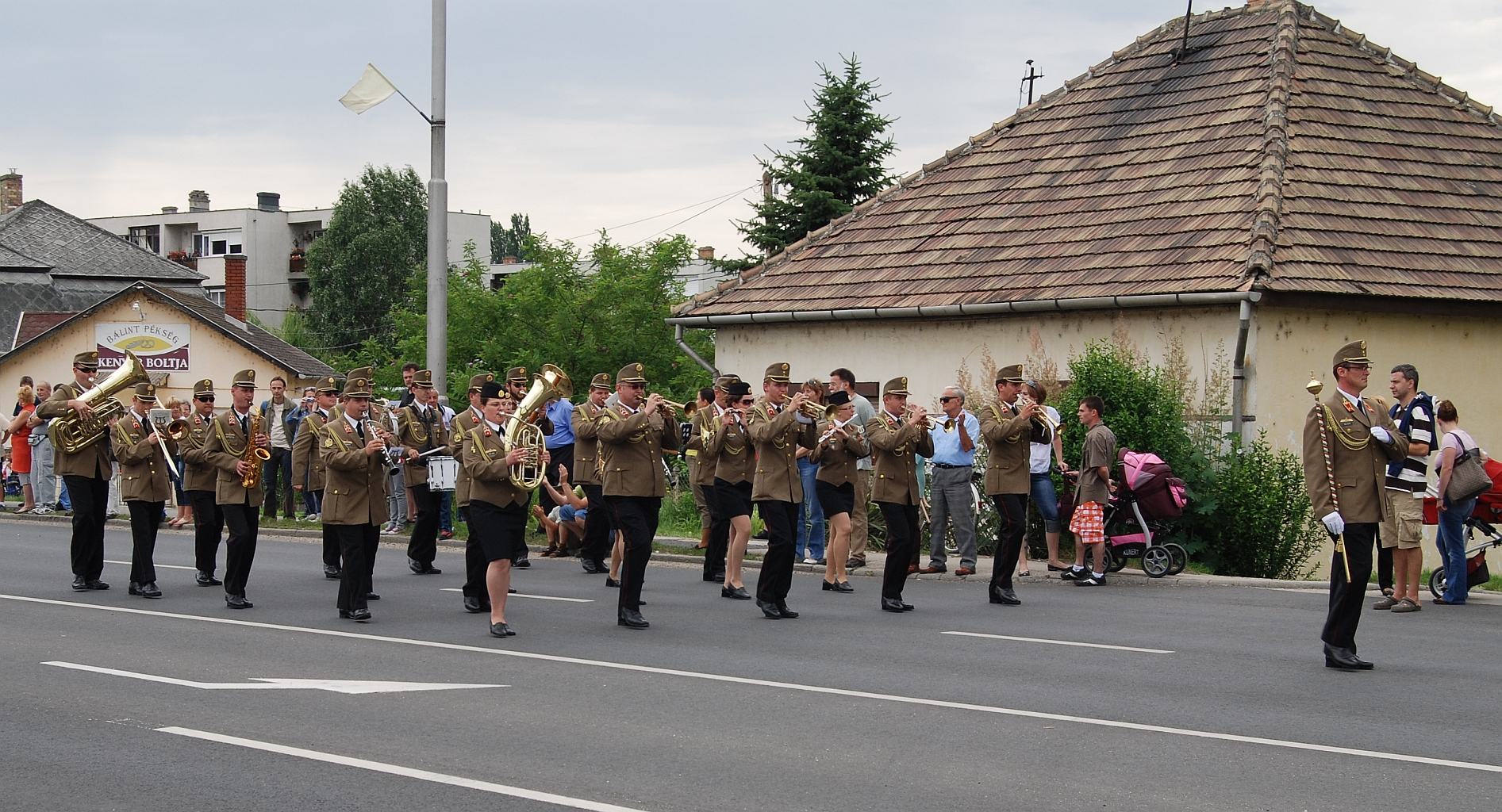
The HDF Central Band at the 2010 Water Music Flower Festival in Tata.
