= Szentkirályszabadja =

- Coat of arms

- Location of Veszprém county in Hungary

- Location of Szentkirályszabadja
- Coordinates: 47.05723°N 17.97101°E
- Country: Hungary
- County: Veszprém

Area
  - Total: 22.39 km^{2} (8.64 sq mi)

Population (2004)
  - Total: 2,150
  - Density: 96.02/km^{2} (248.7/sq mi)
- Time zone: UTC+1 (CET)
  - Summer (DST): UTC+2 (CEST)
- Postal code: 8225
- Area code: 88

Szentkirályszabadja is a village in Veszprém county, Hungary. For many years it was the home of the 87th Bakony Combat Helicopter Regiment of the 5th Army, Hungarian People's Army.

== Climate ==
Szentkirályszabadja's climate is classified as oceanic climate (Köppen Cfb). The annual average temperature is 10.5 °C (50.9 °F), the hottest month in July is 21.1 °C (70.0 °F), and the coldest month is −0.4 °C (31.3 °F) in January. The annual precipitation is 584.3 millimetres (23.00 in), of which June is the wettest with 67.9 millimetres (2.67 in), while March is the driest with only 28.1 millimetres (1.11 in). The extreme temperature throughout the year ranged from −19.9 °C (−3.8 °F) on 31 December 1996 to 38.2 °C (100.8 °F) on 20 July 2007.

Climate data for Szentkirályszabadja, 1991−2020 normals
Month	Jan	Feb	Mar	Apr	May	Jun	Jul	Aug	Sep	Oct	Nov	Dec	Year
Record high °C (°F)	17.2 (63.0)	19.9 (67.8)	22.1 (71.8)	28.6 (83.5)	31.0 (87.8)	34.4 (93.9)	38.2 (100.8)	37.9 (100.2)	32.0 (89.6)	26.1 (79.0)	21.5 (70.7)	16.6 (61.9)	38.2 (100.8)
Mean daily maximum °C (°F)	2.8 (37.0)	5.1 (41.2)	10.2 (50.4)	16.2 (61.2)	20.7 (69.3)	24.5 (76.1)	26.7 (80.1)	26.6 (79.9)	20.9 (69.6)	15.3 (59.5)	8.5 (47.3)	3.3 (37.9)	15.1 (59.2)
Daily mean °C (°F)	−0.4 (31.3)	1.3 (34.3)	5.5 (41.9)	11.0 (51.8)	15.3 (59.5)	19.2 (66.6)	21.1 (70.0)	20.9 (69.6)	15.7 (60.3)	10.5 (50.9)	5.0 (41.0)	0.4 (32.7)	10.5 (50.9)
Mean daily minimum °C (°F)	−3.2 (26.2)	−2.2 (28.0)	1.5 (34.7)	6.0 (42.8)	10.2 (50.4)	14.0 (57.2)	15.9 (60.6)	15.7 (60.3)	11.2 (52.2)	6.5 (43.7)	2.1 (35.8)	−2.1 (28.2)	6.3 (43.3)
Record low °C (°F)	−18.4 (−1.1)	−18.0 (−0.4)	−19.3 (−2.7)	−5.0 (23.0)	0.6 (33.1)	4.5 (40.1)	8.0 (46.4)	7.2 (45.0)	2.1 (35.8)	−8.8 (16.2)	−12.6 (9.3)	−19.9 (−3.8)	−19.9 (−3.8)
Average precipitation mm (inches)	28.8 (1.13)	29.4 (1.16)	28.1 (1.11)	35.3 (1.39)	61.8 (2.43)	67.9 (2.67)	65.2 (2.57)	66.2 (2.61)	60.8 (2.39)	52.0 (2.05)	49.9 (1.96)	38.9 (1.53)	584.3 (23.00)
Average precipitation days (≥ 1.0 mm)	5.4	5.3	5.1	5.8	8.0	7.3	7.7	6.4	6.5	6.3	7.2	6.4	77.4
Average relative humidity (%)	82.6	76.7	68.5	63.0	67.4	67.7	65.1	65.8	72.1	78.3	85.5	85.1	73.2
Source: NOAA

== Gallery ==
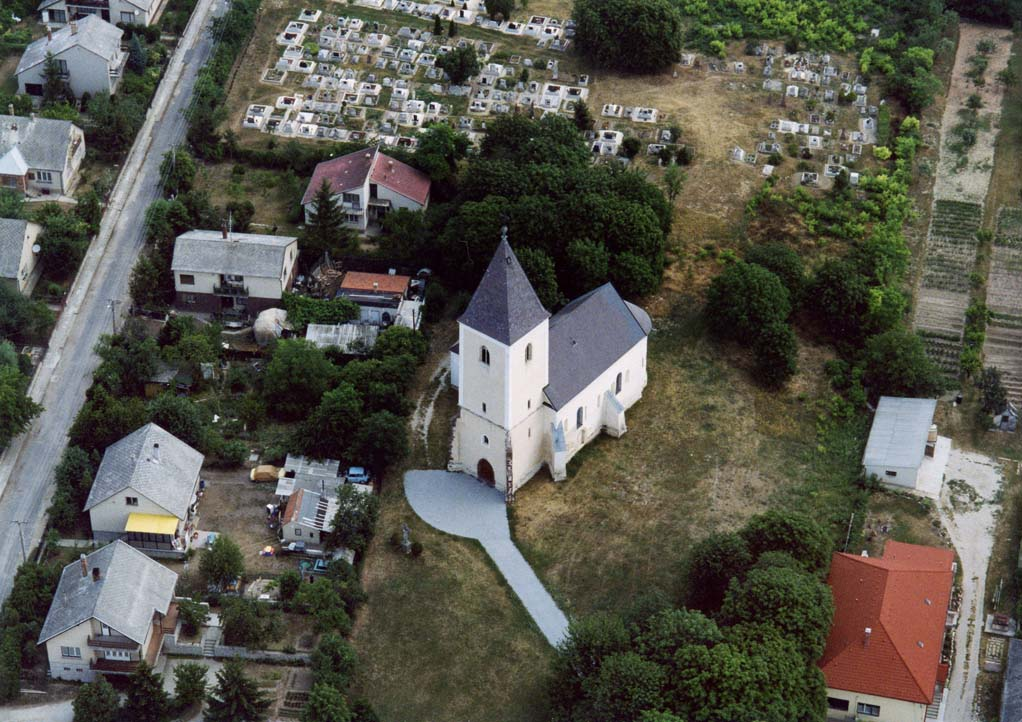

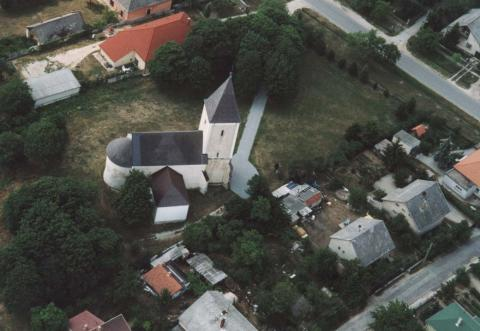

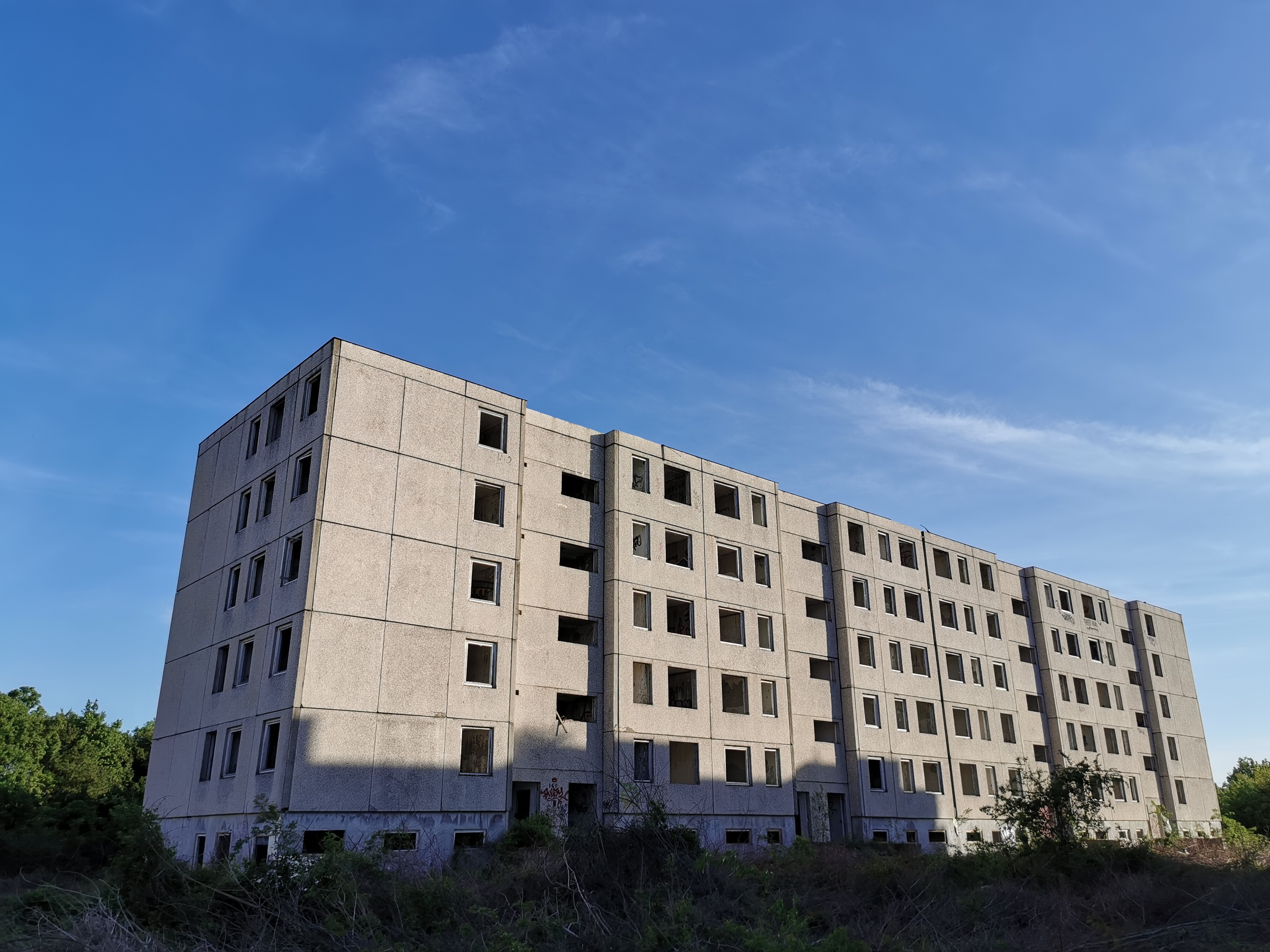
Szentkirályszabadja, abandoned Russian barracks

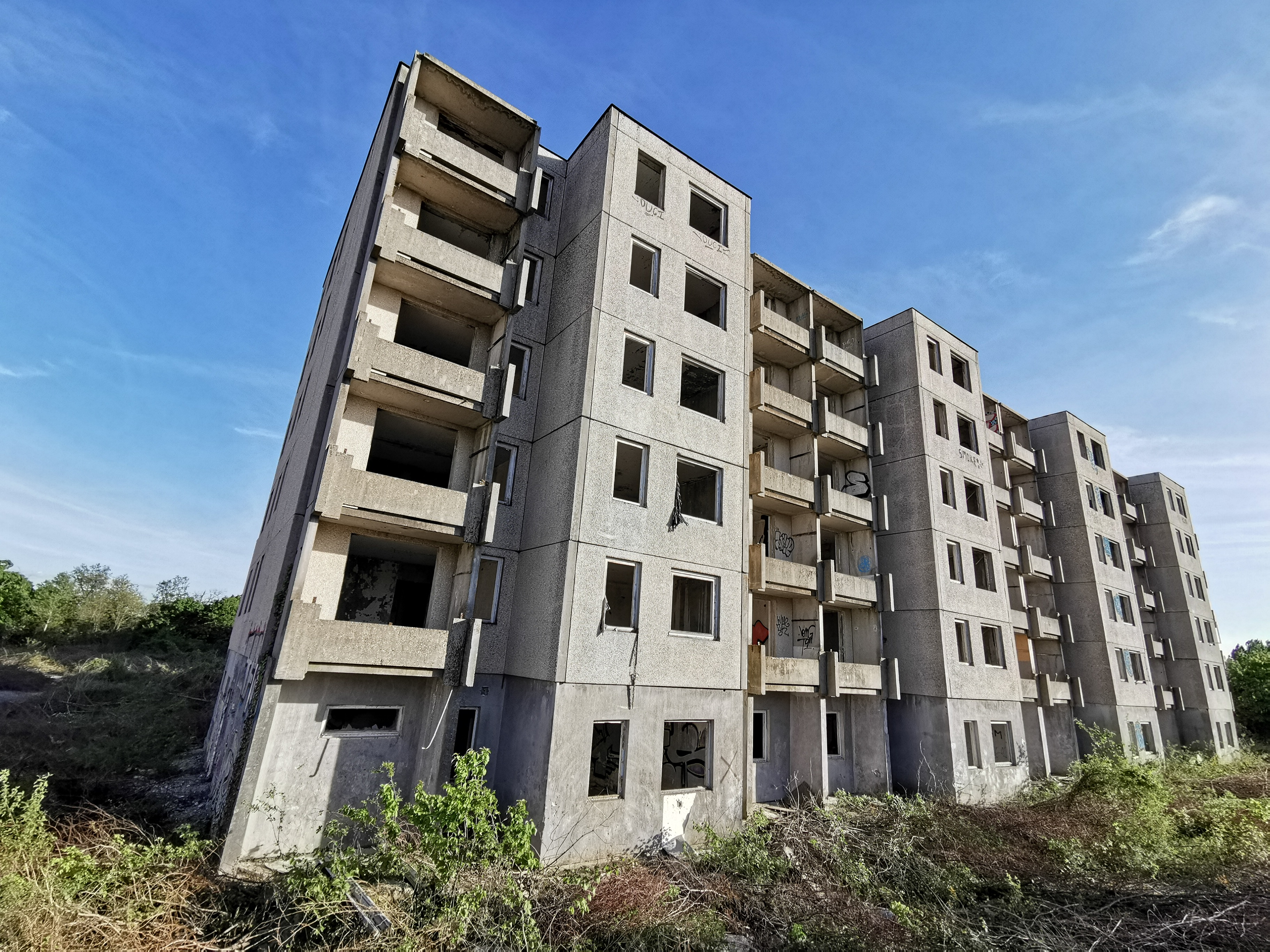
Szentkirályszabadja, abandoned Russian barracks

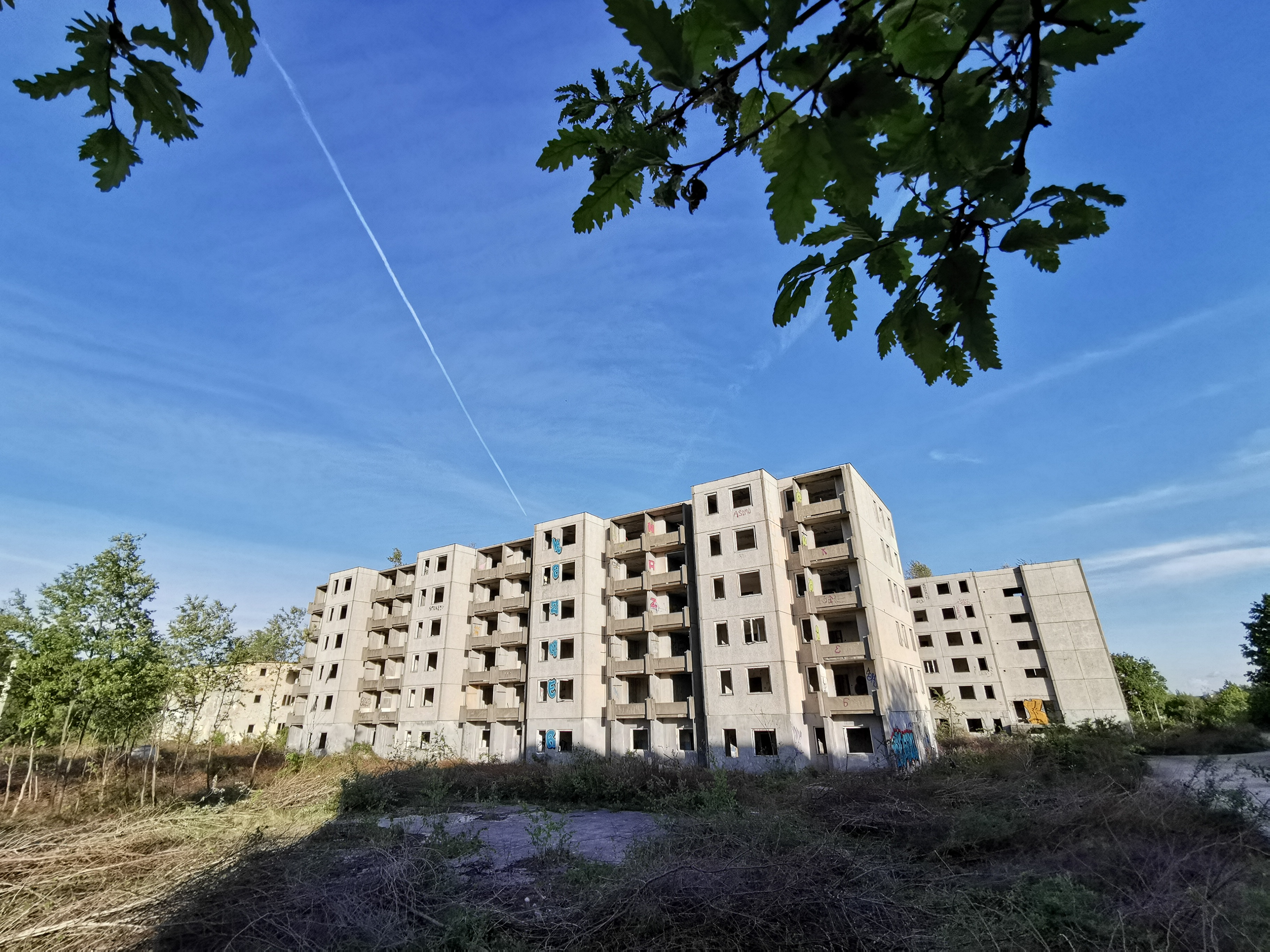
Szentkirályszabadja, abandoned Russian barracks
