= Portrait of Ferenc Herczeg =

Sculpture by István Szentgyörgyi

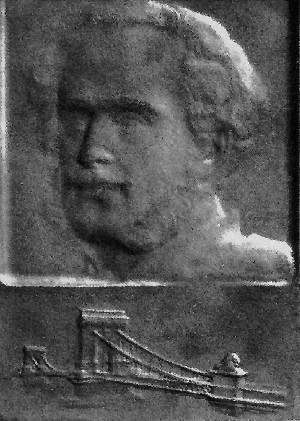
Portrait of Count István Széchenyi and Széchenyi Chain Bridge, Budapest. Reverse of a Ferenc Herczeg Medal by István Szentgyörgyi

Portrait of Ferenc Herczeg is an undated sculpture by Hungarian sculptor István Szentgyörgyi.

The title Portrait of Ferenc Herceg is misleading because the picture shows the reverse of the bronze medal/plate in question and does not represent the portrait of the playwright Herczeg, but shows the portrait of Count István Széchenyi, who initiated the construction of the Széchenyi Chain Bridge in Budapest. The work is a reference to Ferenc Herczeg's drama “The Bridge”, a fictional love story about the reason for the construction.

The description of the bronze "Ferenc Herceg (reverse)" reads: "The undated medal represents the portrait of Count István Széchenyi to Herceg's drama 'The Bridge' ".

The Bronze medal measures 69 cm (27 in) x 47 cm (19 in) and is currently on display at the Hungarian National Museum in Budapest.
