= Land Command (Hungary) =

The HDF Land Command (Hungarian: MH Szárazföldi Parancsnokság) is the leading organization of the Hungarian Ground Forces, which operates under the direct command of the Defence Forces Command. It plans and directs the refueling, equipment, supplies, infrastructure, maintenance and development of the Ground Forces, as well as the preparation, redeployment, deployment, national support and rotation of military organizations involved in peacekeeping operations. Its headquarters are located at Székesfehérvár.

Its original legal predecessor, Headquarters 5th Army, was established on 3 August 1961 in Budapest. A year later it was relocated to Székesfehérvár. It started operating under difficult conditions, only Second World War obsolete technical equipment was available and it was plagued by material shortages. The staff consisted of young officers and non-commissioned officers.

== Lineage ==
In 1991, the 5th Army Command became the Land Forces Command. Later name changes included:

- 1991–1994: Land Forces Command
- 1994–1997: 4. Mechanized Corps Command
- 1997–2001: MH Land General Staff
- 2001: MH Land Command

== Formations in the 1960s ==
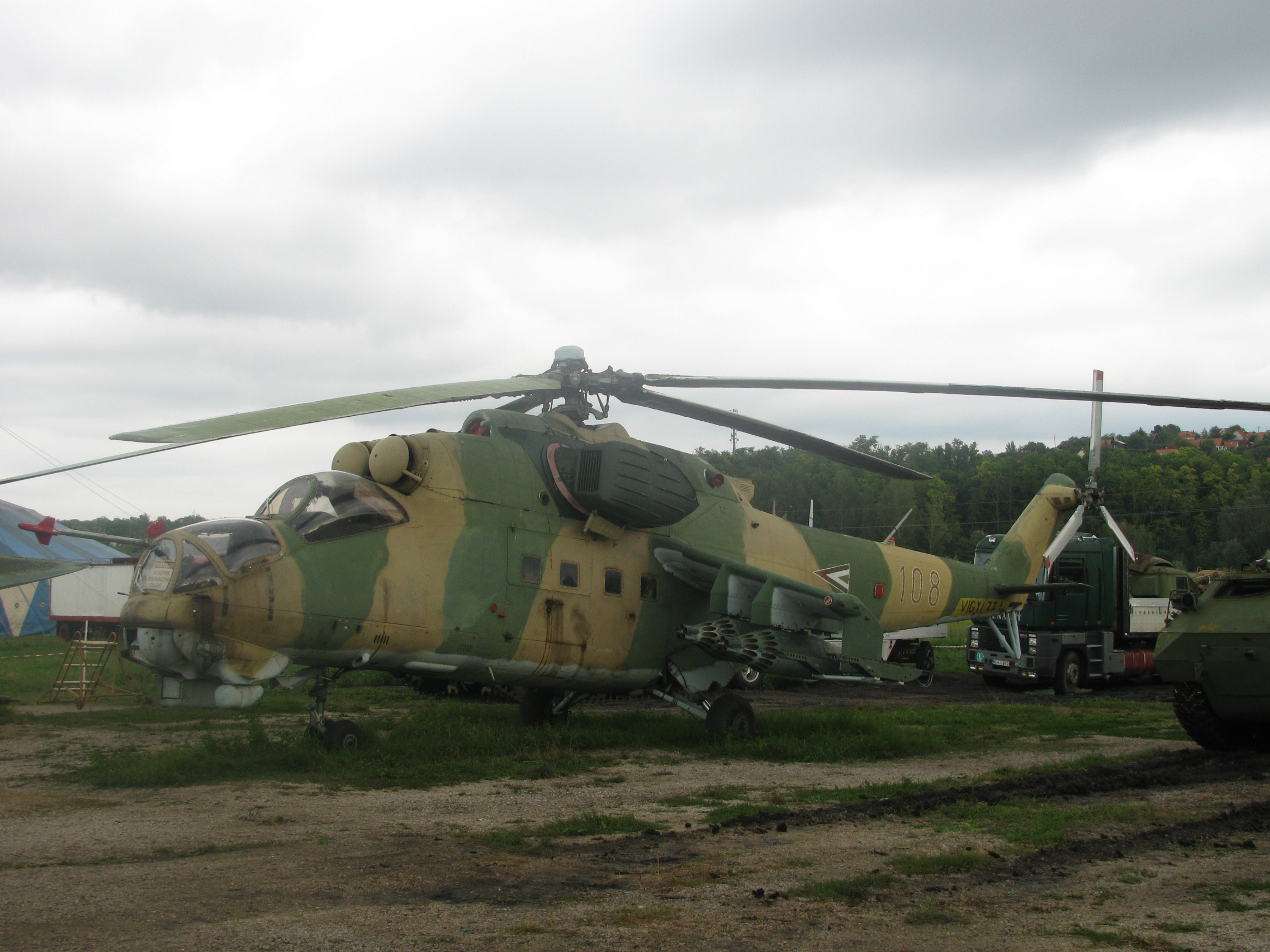
Hungarian Army Mi-24 attack helicopter (note photo was taken in 2010).

Hungarian divisions were patterned after the Soviet model; by the early 1980s, they were motorised to the extent that there was sufficient transport to carry all personnel when the division moved.

- 4th Motor Rifle Division (Gyöngyös)
- 7th Motor Rifle Division (Kiskunfélegyháza)
- 8th Motor Rifle Division (Zalaegerszeg)
- 9th Motor Rifle Division (Kaposvár)
- 15th Motor Rifle Division (Nyíregyháza)
- 11th Tank Division (Tata)

In November 1966, the 3rd Mechanized Corps was established in the Dózsa György Barracks at Cegléd. This corps was to oversee second-stage formations of lower readiness.

In 1987, the 5th Army included the 5th Missile Brigade (Tapolca, Hungary); the 37th Pontoon Regiment (Ercsi); the 60th Engineer Brigade (Szeged); the 15th Pontoon Regiment (Szentes); the 123rd Technical Engineer Regiment (Orosháza); the 93rd independent Chemical Defence Regiment (Kiskőrös); the 75th Medical Regiment (Nagykanizsa); the 87th Combat Helicopter Regiment (Szentkirályszabadja) with Mil Mi-8 and Mi-24; the 3rd Corps, with its headquarters still at Cegled; and the 7th, 8th, 9th Motor Rifle and 11th (Tank) Divisions.

The 87th Regiment began as the 86th Composite Aircraft Squadron in Kecskemet. In 1969 it relocated to Szentkirályszabadja. In 1973 the Tactical Aviation Command (CsRP) was formed (until then all air assets other than training were subordinated to the National Air Defence Command (OLP)). In 1973, with the reorganization of air units, the 86th Composite Air Squadron was upgraded into the 87th Transport Helicopter Regiment. In 1984 its name changed to Combat Helicopter Regiment when the second Mi-24 squadron was added. Until 1987 it was a by-the-book Soviet army-level combat helicopter regiment. Then a fourth squadron was added – a command and EW squadron of Mi-17, Mi-9 (the flying command post variant) and Mi-17PPA.

== Formations from 2001 ==
- HDF 5th Bocskai István Infantry Brigade
- HDF 25th Klapka György Light Rifle Brigade
- HDF 11th Hunyadi Mátyás Tank Battalion
- HDF 37th II. Ferenc Rákóczi Technical Brigade
- HDF 24th Gornely Bornemissza Reconnaissance Battalion (see hu:MH 24. Bornemissza Gergely Felderítő Ezred)
- HDF 34th Bercsényi László Special Forces Battalion
- 93rd Sándor Petőfi Chemical Defense Battalion
- HDF 5th Electronics-Fighting Company (electronic warfare company?)
- 64th Boconádi Szabó József Logistics Regiment
- MH 43rd Leadership Support Battalion
- HDF Bakony Fighting Training Center

== Formations as of 2020 ==
- 1st Explosive Ordnance Disposal and River Flotilla Regiment "Honvéd", at Újpest military port in Budapest
- 2nd Special Forces Brigade "vitéz Árpád Bertalan", in Szolnok Air Base
- 5th Infantry Brigade "István Bocskai", in Debrecen
- 24th Reconnaissance Regiment "Gergely Bornemissza" in Debrecen
- 25th Infantry Brigade "György Klapka", in Tata
- 37th Engineer Regiment "Ferenc Rákóczi II", in Szentes
- 43rd Signal and Command Support Regiment "József Nagysándor", in Székesfehérvár
- 93rd CBRN defense Battalion "Sándor Petőfi", in Székesfehérvár

== See also ==
- Structure of the Hungarian Defence Forces
