= István Szentgyörgyi =

Hungarian sculptor

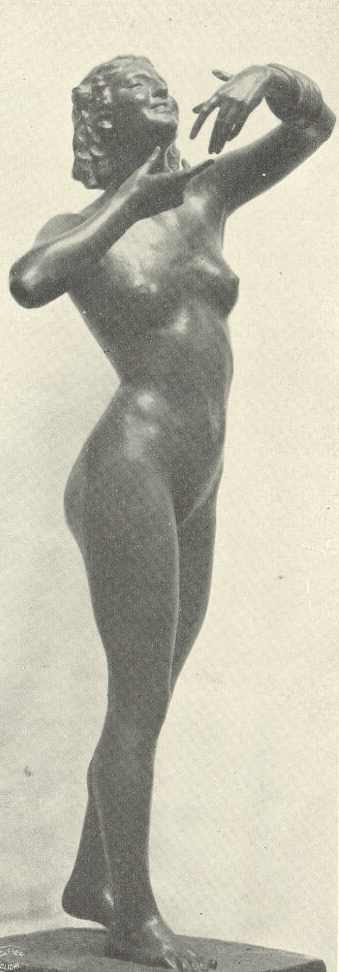
Szentgyörgyi sculpture

István Szentgyörgyi (1881 - 1938) was a Hungarian sculptor. His work exemplified neo-classicism. Fourteen of his statues are in the possession of the Hungarian National Gallery and a copy of "Tip Catting" can be found in the Museum of Modern Art in Rome.

== Biography ==
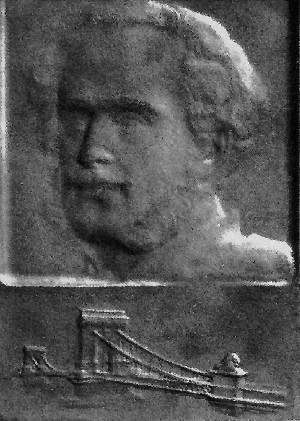
"Ferenc Herczeg" (Reverse) Bronze, 69 x 47 cm Hungarian National Museum, Budapest The undated medal represents the portrait of Count István Széchenyi and is a reference to Ferenc Herczeg's drama "The Bridge" (1925)

His works include "Tip Catting" 1920, "Portrait of Ferenc Herczeg" (undated), "Lamp (sculpture)" 1923, "Áron Szilády" in Kiskunhalas 1927, "My Son with a Dog" 1927, "Memorial of the 32nd Regiment" 1933, and "Portrait of István Réti".
