= Szolnok Air Base =

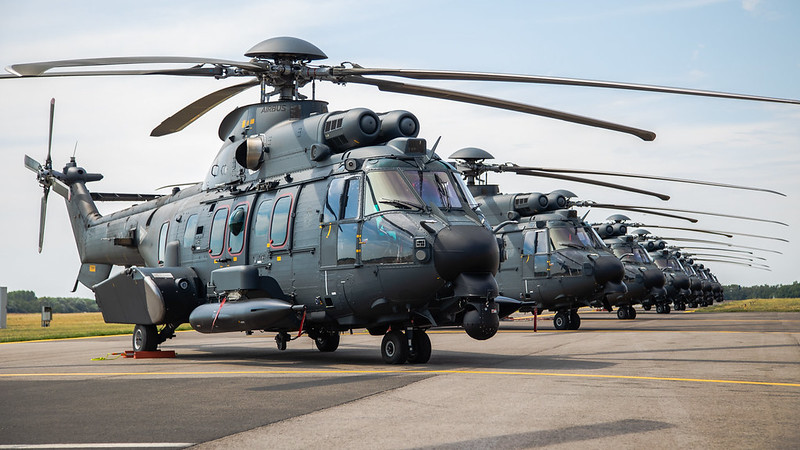
- IATA: none; ICAO: LHSN

Summary
- Airport type: Military
- Location: Szolnok, Hungary
- Elevation AMSL: 322 ft (98 m)
- Coordinates: 47°07′22″N 020°14′07″E

Map
- Location of air base in Hungary

Runways
| Direction | Length | | Surface |
| Direction | m | ft | Surface |
|---|---|---|---|
| 02/20 | 2,000 | 6,562 | Asphalt |
- Source: DAFIF

Szolnok Air Base (ICAO: LHSN) is a military air base located near Szolnok, a city in Jász-Nagykun-Szolnok county, Hungary.

== Facilities ==
The air base resides at an elevation of 322 feet (98 m) above mean sea level. It has one runway designated 02/20 with an asphalt surface measuring 2,000 by 70 metres (6,562 ft × 230 ft).

== Accidents and incidents ==
- On 24 April 1968, Lisunov Li-2 HA-LIO of Magyar Honvédelmi Szövetség was destroyed by fire in a refuelling accident.
