= HDF 34th Bercsényi László Special Forces Battalion =

- Hungarian: MH 34. Bercsényi László Különleges Műveleti Zászlóalj
- Emblem of the 34th Bercsényi László Special Forces Battalion
- Active: 1959 – present
- Country: Hungary
- Branch: Hungarian Ground Forces
- Type: Special Forces
- Part of: Land Command (Hungary)
- Garrison/HQ: Szolnok
- Engagements: War in Afghanistan

The 34th Bercsényi László Special Forces Battalion (Hungarian: MH 34. Bercsényi László Különleges Műveleti Zászlóalj), is a battalion-sized formation of the Hungarian Defence Force special operations forces.

== History ==
The 34th Bercsényi László Special Forces Battalion was created during the Cold War. The unit traces its origin to the World War II Royal Hungarian 1st vitéz Bertalan Árpád Parachute Battalion, which fought against the Soviet Red Army. In 1945 the remaining elements of the regiment were disbanded.

In 1951, as part of the Hungarian People's Army, a new parachute battalion was created in Székesfehérvár. This unit was disbanded after the 1953 military forces reduction. After the events of the 1956 revolution a stabilization process began.

In 1957 a special purpose reconnaissance company was created. The company was enlarged to battalion level in 1962 and it was allocated to the Chief of Staffs 2nd Directorate. The 27th Separate Reconnaissance Company was detached from the battalion, forming a sub unit of the 5th Combined Arms Army stationed in Székesfehérvár.

The unit served as the eyes and ears of the Army for decades. It had during this time three special purpose long range recon companies. In 1977 the 27th Separate Reconnaissance Company was again part of the battalion, and the battalion became the 5th Army's reconnaissance unit.

In 1990 the 34th Special Reconnaissance Battalion took on the name of László Bercsényi son of General Miklós Bercsényi.

In 2001 the unit moved from its garrison to its present location at Szolnok Air Base. In 2005 the United States Army's Mobile Training Team arrived to Szolnok to help transform the reconnaissance battalion to a special operations battalion. Members of the unit received "Special Forces" training.

Operators of the battalion served in War in Afghanistan along with other NATO special forces units.

The battalion was merged into the MH 2nd Gallant Bertalan Árpád Special Forces Brigade in 2017.
