= Sándor Szurmay =

Hungarian military officer and politician

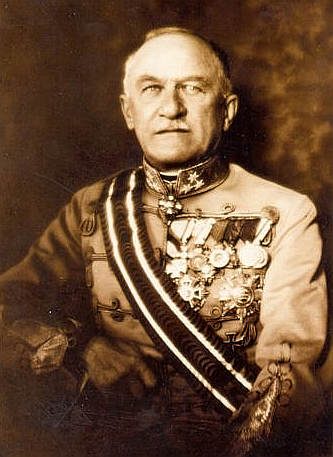
- Sándor Szurmay in Military uniform. Date Unknown.
- Born: 19 December 1860; Boksánbánya, Kingdom of Hungary, Austrian Empire
- Died: 26 February 1945 (aged 84); Budapest, Hungary
- Military career
- Allegiance: Austria-Hungary; Kingdom of Hungary
- Service years: 1882–1921
- Rank: Colonel General
- Conflicts: World War I
- Awards: Military Order of Maria Theresa

Vitéz Baron Sándor Szurmay de Uzsok (19 December 1860 – 26 February 1945) was a Hungarian military officer and politician, who served as Minister of Defence for the Hungarian portion of the Dual Monarchy of Austria-Hungary between 1917 and 1918.

== Life ==
=== Early life and career ===
Sándor Szurmay was born in 1860 at Boksánbánya (now: Bocşa, Romania) which located in the historical Krassó-Szörény County. He attended the secondary school for sciences in Szeged, then interrupting his studies he joined the Imperial Royal Privileged Austrian State Railway Company, where he worked as a trainee and later as an official.

In 1882 he chose the military way. Szurmay started his service at the Eighteenth Home Defence Battalion of Lugos. After completing the course of studies at the Ludovica Military Academy classes he served as adjutant in a rank of Second Lieutenant at the various corps of the Magyar Honvédség. Between 1886 and 1887 he finished the academy's upper classes and between 1887 and 1889 the Imperial and Royal Staff College (K.u.k. Kriegsschule), that is the staff officer's academy. He was promoted to a First Lieutenant in 1889 and he was ordered onto the Fourth Army Corps' headquarters in Budapest.

=== Later career ===
By November 1917 Szurmay held the rank of General der Infanterie and held the ministerial portfolio for the Hungarian branch of the armed forces, the Honvéd. In November 1917 he officially demanded the separation of the joint army of Austria-Hungary into separate Austrian and Hungarian formations. At a crown council chaired by the emperor the following month he again pressed for a full division of the k.u.k. army, adding that "all groups in Hungary are united on the issue of a Hungarian army." This policy was addressed again at a council of marshals in January 1918, where the decision was put off until the end of the war.

== Publications ==
- A wörthi (fröschwilleri) csata 1870. 6 Aug.. Harczászati tanulmány. with maps and images Budapest, 1890.
- Az anspachi hadseregek ismertetése. U. ott, 1891. (Hungarian adaption of Richard Knötel's German language work).
- A mohácsi vész 1526-ban. Battle plan and detailed description onto Ezredéves Országos Kiállítás of 1896 aims. Budapest, 1896.
- A mohácsi hadjárat 1526-ban.. Térképvázlattal, rajzmellékletekkel, Budapest, 1901.
- A szolgálati szabályzat II. részének új kiadása, Budapest, 1896.
- A honvédség fejlődésének története annak felállításától napjainkig 1868–1898. Képekkel és mellékletekkel. Megjelent a Ludovika Akadémia Közlönyében, Budapest, 1898.
- A Thaya menti Waidhofen környékén 1891-ben tartott hadtest-gyakorlatok, megjelent a Ludovika Akadémia Közlönyében, 1892.
- Weiterentwicklung der kön. ung. Landwehr (A Magyar Királyi Honvédség fejlődése), megjelent a Minerva c. katonai folyóiratban, Bécs, 1893. 23. és 24. sz.
- Die Honvéd-Institution (A Honvédség intézménye), megjelent a Pester Lloydban, 1894. okt. 25-i és 26-i sz.
- A magyar gyalogság, Budapest, 19...?.
- Az orosz vörös veszedelem és Magyarország szerepe. ABC könyvtára, Magyar Bolsevistaellenes Liga, Budapest, 1921.
- A magyar katona a Kárpátokban, Királyi Magyar Egyetemi Nyomda kiadása, Budapest, 1940. . (Újabb kiadás: N.R.G.-COM Kiadó, Budapest, 2005, összeállította és az előszót írta Pap Krisztián).
- Háborús emlékírások, in: Diárium 1940–1942, I. évfolyam 1–10. szám/II. évfolyam 1–12. szám/III. évfolyam 1–12. szám, Királyi Magyar Egyetemi Nyomda kiadása, Budapest, 1942.

He wrote several books, and articles, based on military history, on hunting, sport fishing, reptiles, and about the occult:

- Vadászemlékek, horgászélmények, with foreword of Archduke Joseph August of Austria Budapest, 1937
- Horgászvízen, vadcsapáson, Budapest, ?. (Hasonmás kiadás: Facsimile Ex Kiadó, Budapest, 1994).

Political offices
Preceded by Samu Hazai	Minister of Defence; 1917–1918	Succeeded by Béla Linder
