= Transylvanian Saxon cuisine =

The historical coat of arms of the Transylvanian Saxons depicting the seven historical medieval fortified towns/cities in Transylvania (Romanian: Transilvania, German: Siebenbürgen or Transsilvanien).

The Transylvanian Saxon cuisine is the traditional cuisine of the Transylvanian Saxons, a German ethnic group and minority (mostly of Luxembourgish descent—although many Transylvanian Landlers, who are of Austrian descent, had assimilated in this ethnic minority—and part of the broader community of the Germans of Romania) which has been living in Transylvania as well as in other historical regions on the territory of present-day Romania since the mid-12th century onwards.

It is a type of cuisine which, most notably, shares many similarities with Romanian cuisine and German cuisine, given the centuries-long mutual/reciprocal influence and cohabitation between the Saxons and Romanians in Transylvania, a Romanian historical region situated at the crossroads of Central, Eastern, and Southeastern Europe respectively. The Transylvanian Saxon cuisine has evolved since the High Middle Ages to the present day.

== Background ==
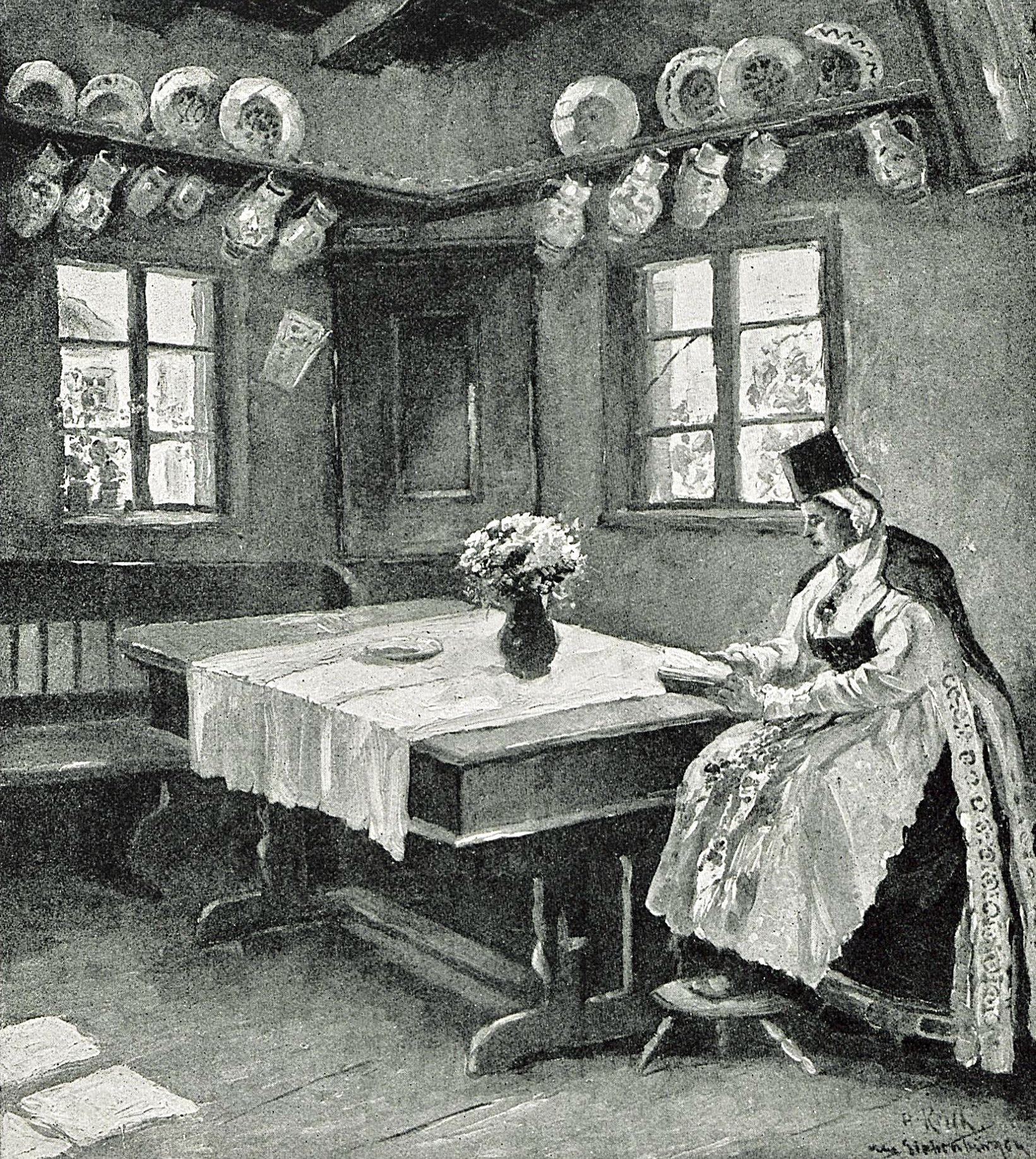
The interior of a Transylvanian Saxon household, as depicted by German painter Albert Reich (1916 or 1917).

The traditional cuisine of the Transylvanian Saxons had evolved in Transylvania, contemporary Romania, through many centuries, being in contact with the Romanian cuisine but also with the Hungarian cuisine (with influences stemming mostly from the neighbouring Székelys).

At core, the Transylvanian Saxon cuisine is a type of German cuisine (therefore having Central European and Western Europe culinary features) which managed to incorporate external culinary/gastronomical influences stemming from both the Romanian cuisine and the Hungarian cuisine as well along the passage of time.

=== Usage of aromatic herbs ===
The aromatic herb of tarragon (Romanian: Tarhon, German: Estragon) was brought to Transylvania by the Transylvanian Saxons during the Middle Ages. Marjoram is another important herb in the traditional cuisine of the Transylvanian Saxons.

== List of dishes ==
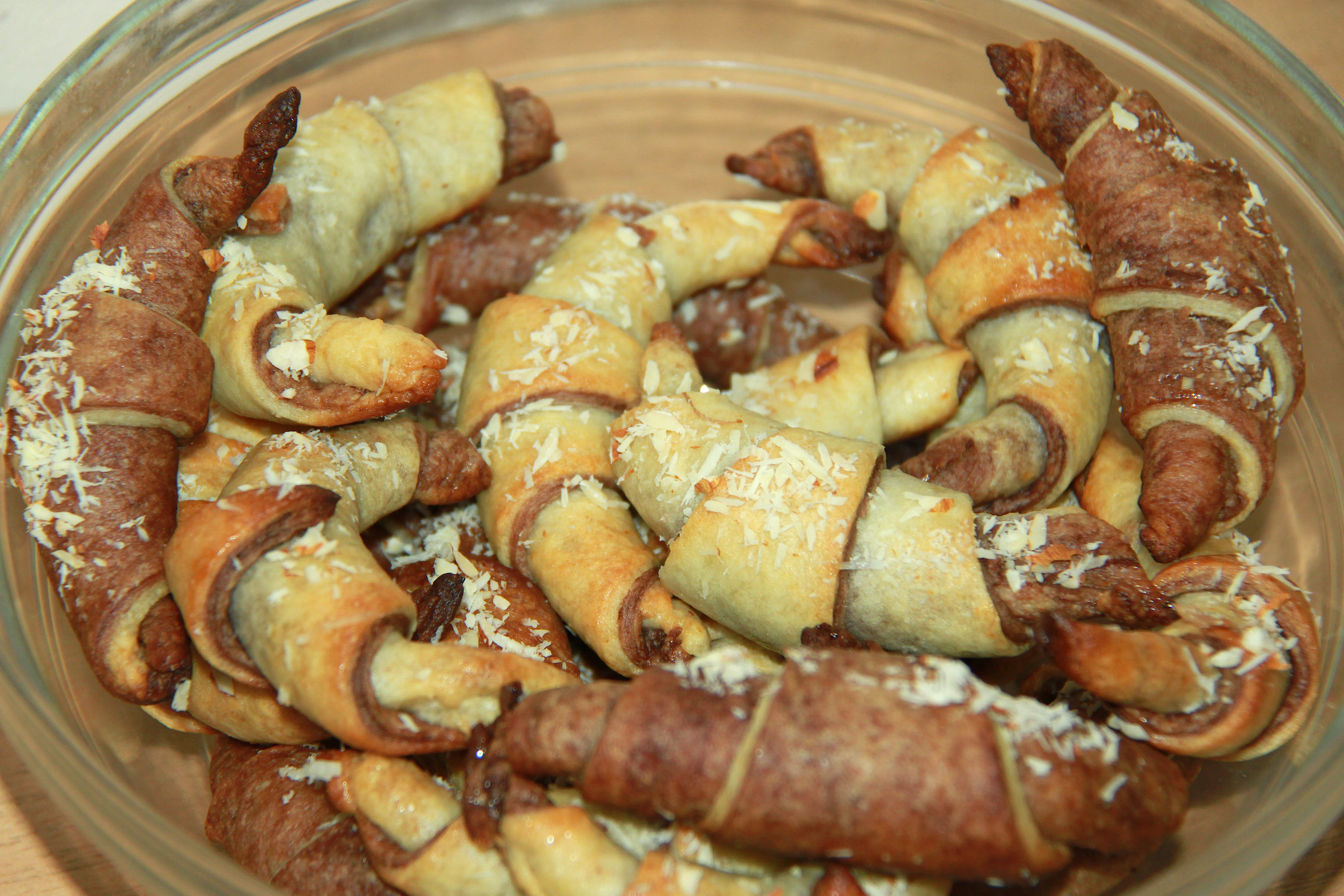
Cornulețe or kipferl as they are known in German in the traditional cuisine of the Transylvanian Saxons.

Some of the dishes which are part of the Transylvanian Saxon cuisine include:

- Palukes (similar to the Romanian mămăligă or the Italian polenta);
- Hanklich (also known as 'Burgberger hanklich'; Romanian: hencleș săsesc);
- Baumstriezel (similar to the Kürtőskalács of the Szeklers or a regional and traditional variant of it);
- Apfelsuppe;
- Brodelawend;
- Kartoffelknodel;
- Lebkuchen (i.e. gingerbread);
- Apple pie;
- Strudel;
- Stollen (especially served during Christmas and similar to the Romanian cozonac).

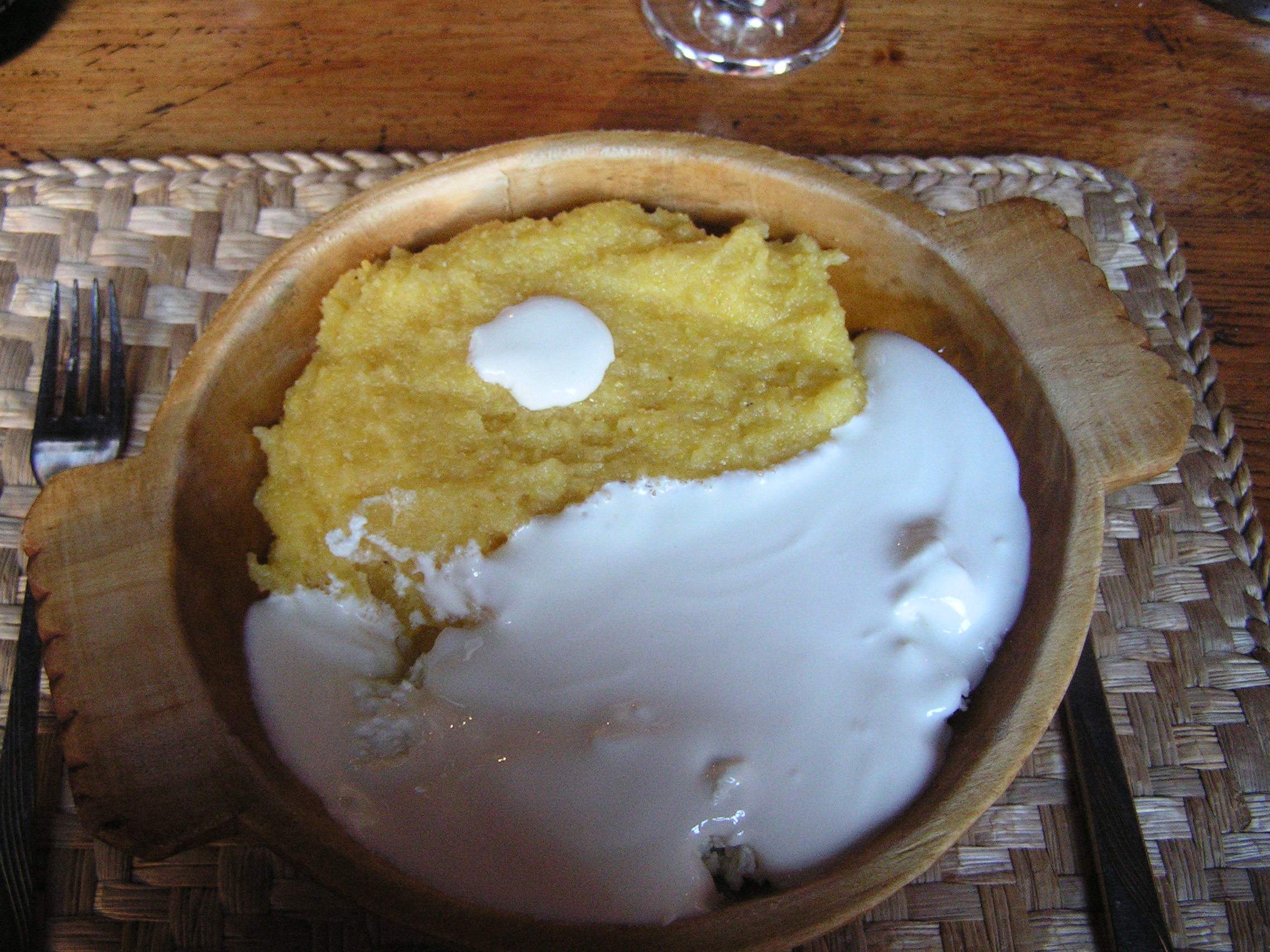
Palukes is similar to the Romanian mămăligă from which it was influenced. (Note: Here pictured with cheese and sour cream or smântână.)

The Transylvanian Landlers (another smaller German minority in Transylvania and a sub-group of the Germans in Romania who has been living mostly in Sibiu County and historically in southern Transylvania along with the Transylvanian Saxons) call 'Palukes' 'Paluks' in their native dialect.

In addition, there are many traditional Transylvanian Saxon pastries (German: Siebenbürgisches Kleingebäck, Transylvanian Saxon: Siweberjesch Kliegebäk) as well, most notably vanillekipferl or kipferl in general, the former being vanilla-flavoured/powdered while the latter can be filled with meat as well. They are similar or identical to the Romanian cornulețe.

Therefore, the Romanian cuisine has influenced the Transylvanian Saxon cuisine over the passing of time with respect to some traditional dishes as had the German cuisine and Austrian cuisine influenced the Romanian one at the same time, most notably when it comes to some desserts, but not only. The regional culture of the Transylvanian Saxons is also savoured and served by Romanians and other ethnic groups in Transylvania as well as tourists from abroad.

== Gallery ==
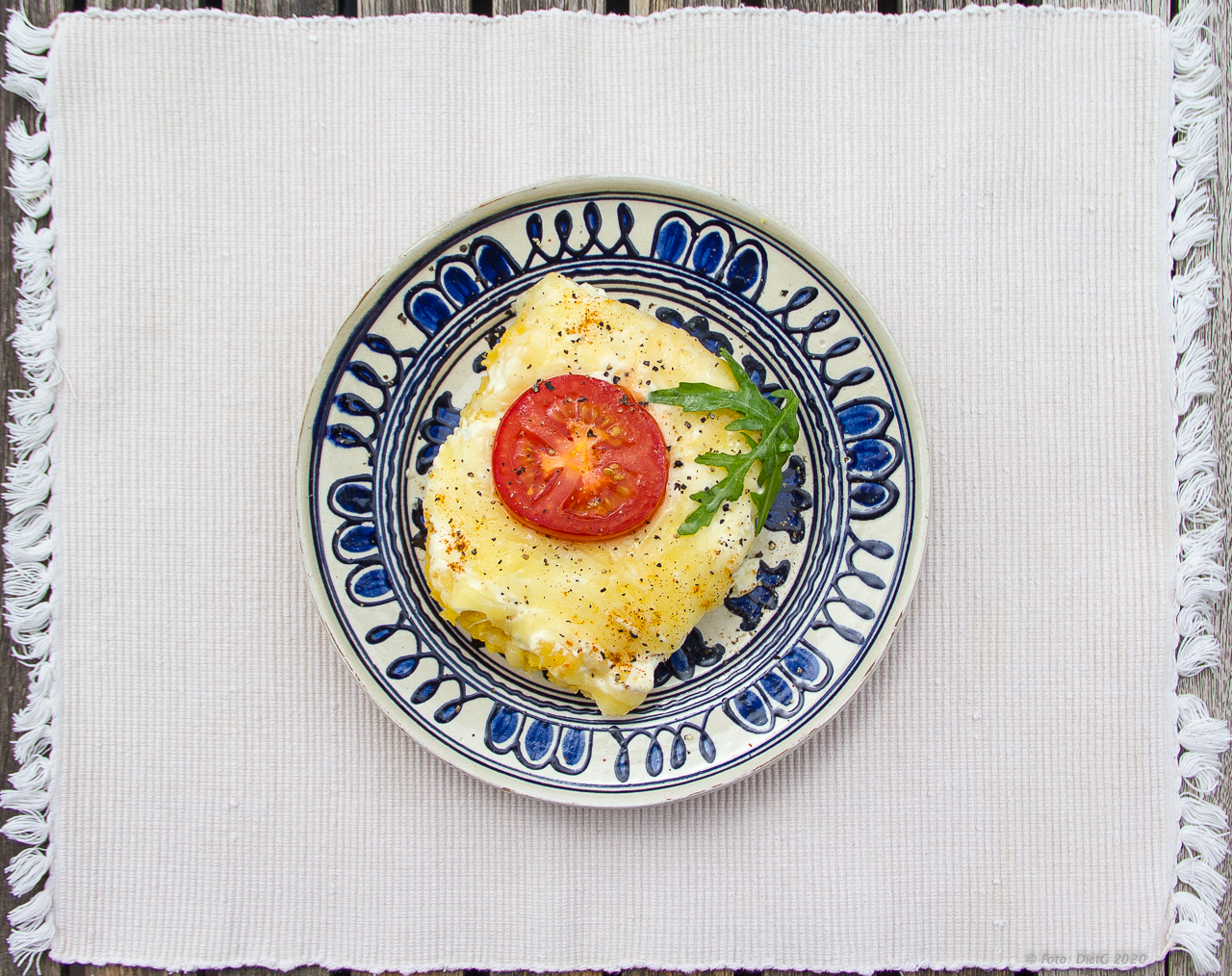
Palukes, similar to the Italian polenta or Romanian mămăligă, but with cheese (here also served with a tomato slice, powdered black pepper, and a herb for decorative purpose)

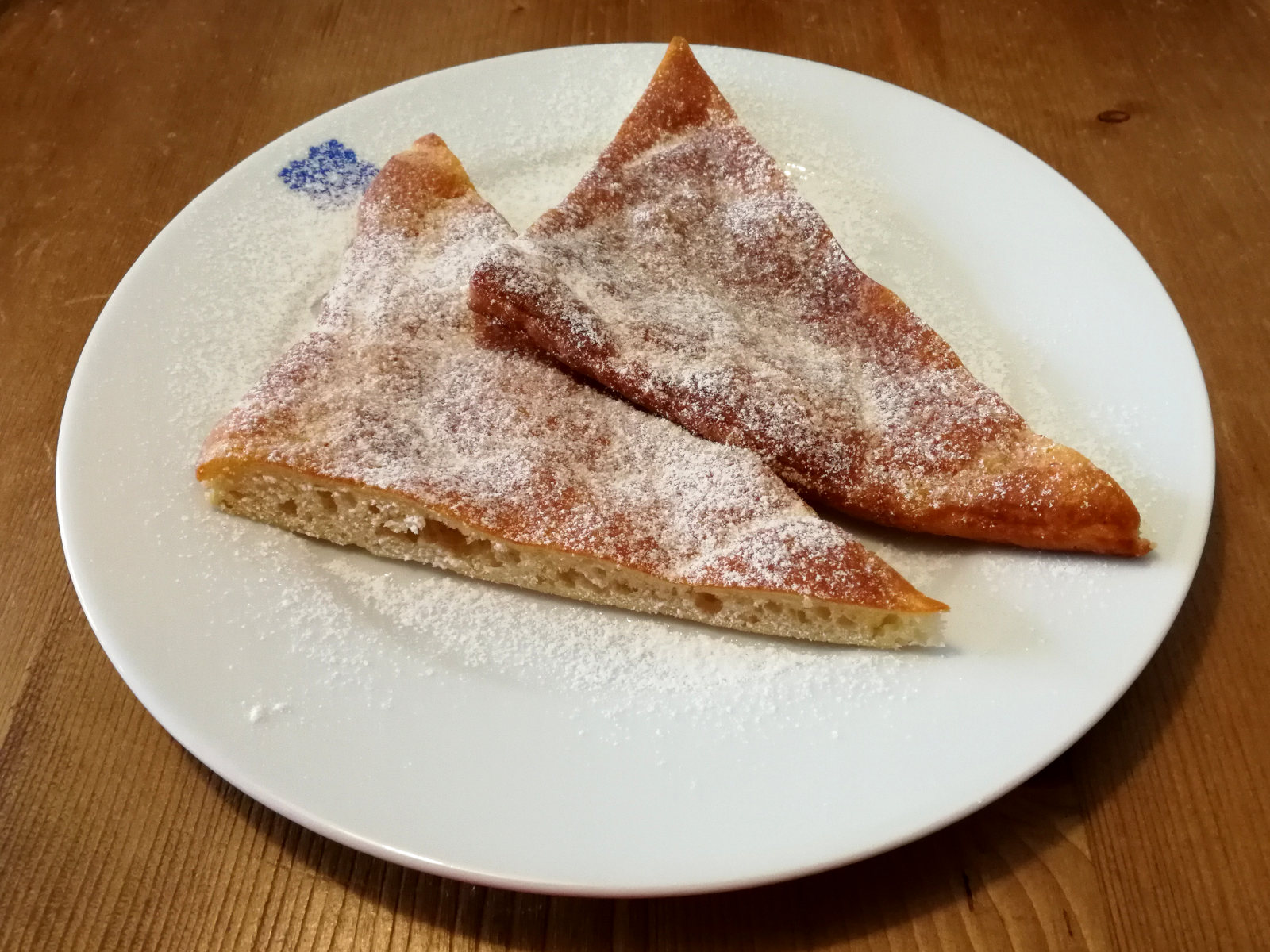
Hanklich from a local restaurant in Sibiu (German: Hermannstadt)

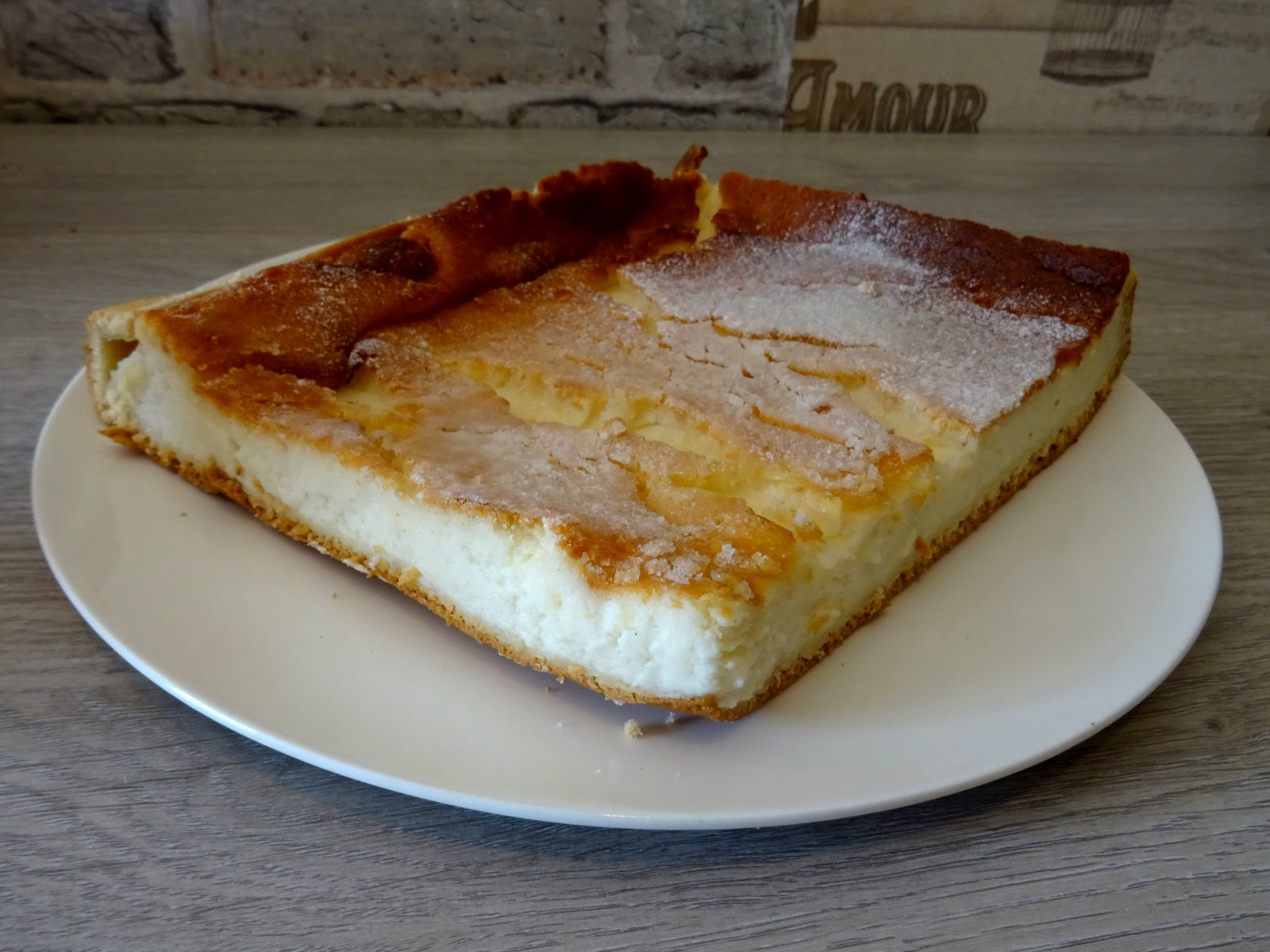
Hanklich from a local bakery in Brașov (German: Kronstadt)

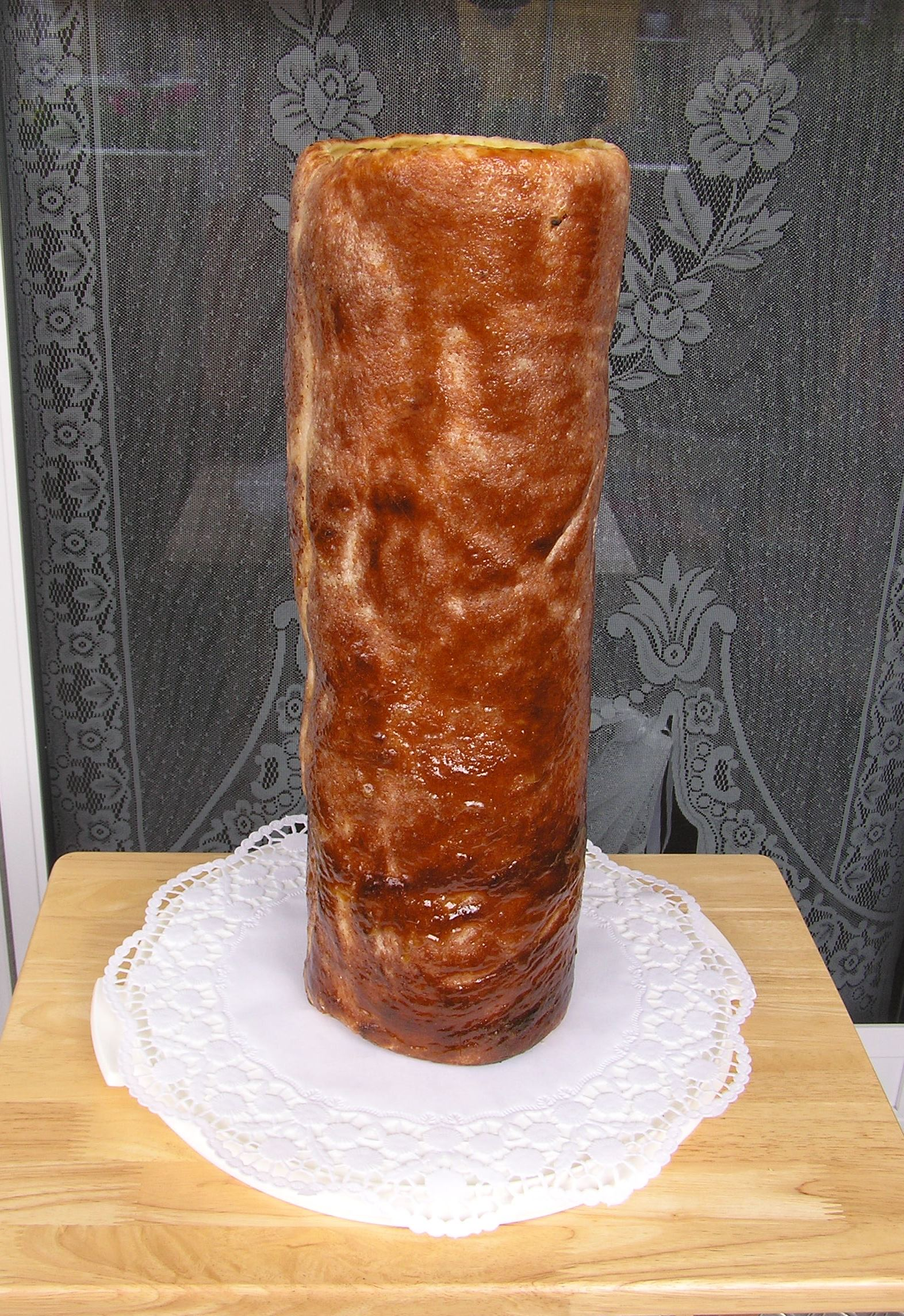
Baumstriezel from Burzenland/Țara Bârsei, south-eastern Transylvania

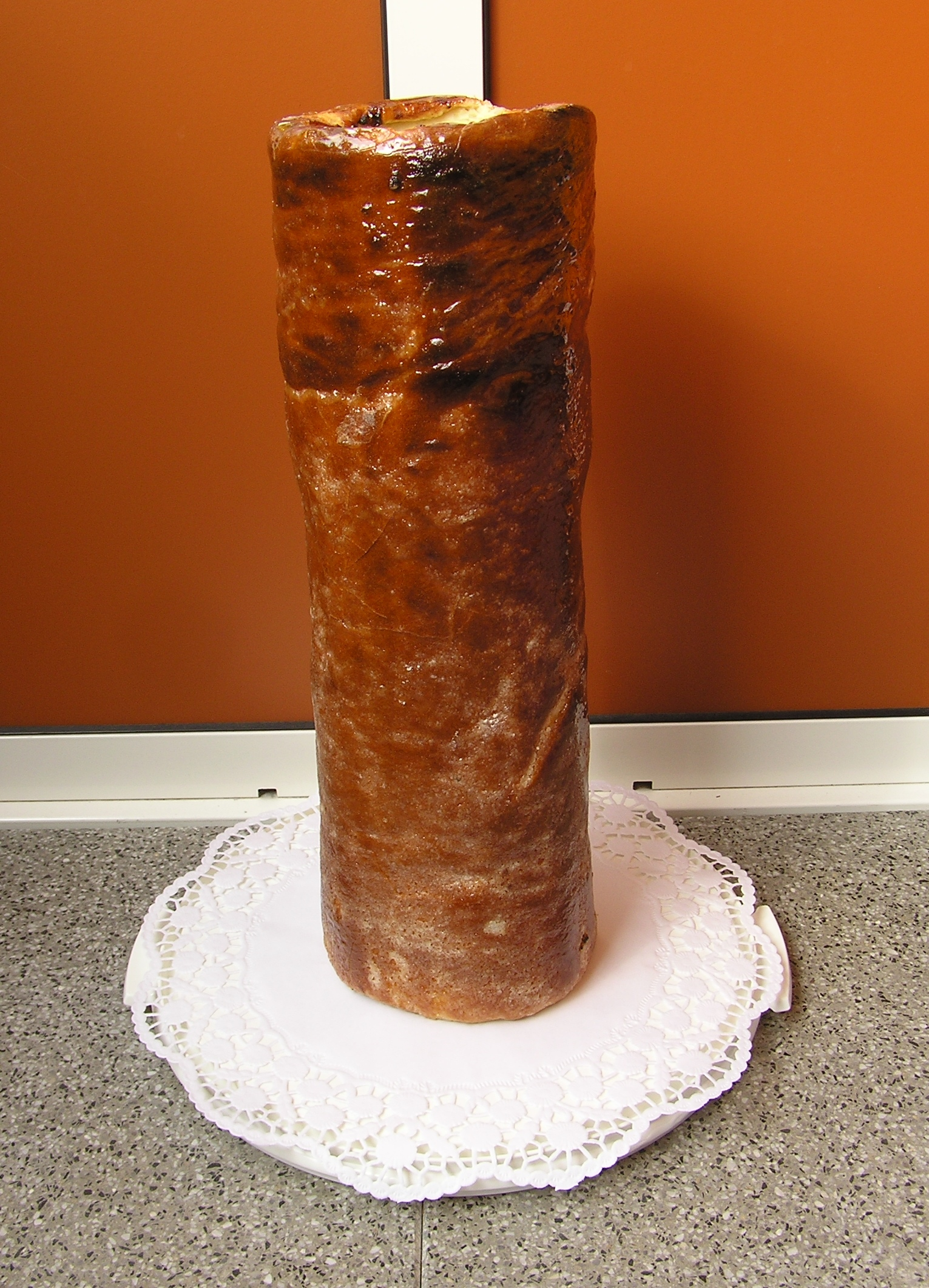
Baumstriezel, alternative view

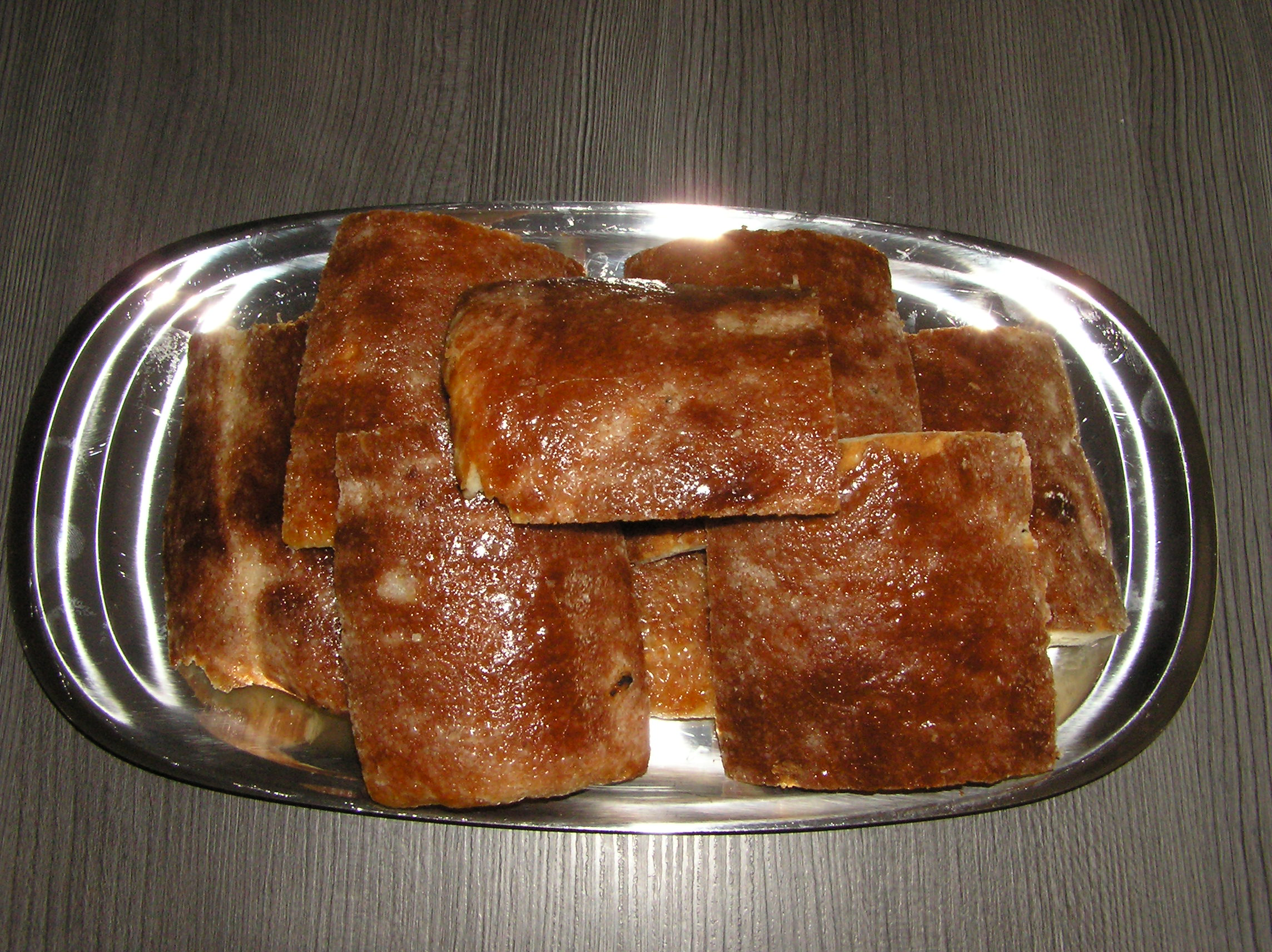
Baumstriezel cut in slices

== See also ==
- Romanian cuisine
- Cuisine of Luxembourg
- German cuisine
- Austrian cuisine
- Swiss cuisine
- Saxon cuisine
- Medieval cuisine
