= Budacu =

Budacu may refer to one of two places in Bistriţa-Năsăud County, Romania:

- Budacu de Jos, a commune
- Budacu de Sus, a village in Dumitrița Commune
