= Otto Fönnekold =

German World War II flying ace

- Fönnekold as a Leutnant
- Born: 15 February 1920; Hamburg
- Died: 31 August 1944 (aged 24); Ssaß-Budak, Siebenbürgen
- Cause of death: Killed in action
- Military career
- Allegiance: Nazi Germany
- Branch: Luftwaffe
- Service years: 1939–1944
- Rank: Oberleutnant (first lieutenant)
- Unit: JG 52
- Commands: 5./JG 52
- Conflicts: World War II
- Awards: Knight's Cross of the Iron Cross

Otto Fönnekold (15 February 1920 – 31 August 1944) was a German Luftwaffe military aviator during World War II, a fighter ace credited with 136 aerial victories—that is, 136 aerial combat encounters resulting in the destruction of the enemy aircraft. All but three of his victories were claimed over the Soviet Air Forces in about 600 combat missions.

Born in Hamburg, Fönnekold was trained as a fighter pilot and posted to Jagdgeschwader 52 (JG 52–52nd Fighter Wing) in late 1942. Fighting on the Eastern Front, he claimed his first aerial victory on 7 September 1942 during Case Blue, the German strategic 1942 summer offensive in southern Russia. On 12 January 1944, Fönnekold was credited with his 100th aerial victory and was awarded the Knight's Cross of the Iron Cross on 26 March 1944. In April 1944, he was appointed Staffelkapitän (squadron leader) of 5. Staffel (5th squadron) of JG 52. He was killed in action on 31 August 1944 by a strafing US North American P-51 Mustang at the airfield in Ssaß-Budak.

== Career ==
Fönnekold was born on 15 February 1920 in Hamburg of the Weimar Republic. Following flight training, (Note: Flight training in the Luftwaffe progressed through the levels A1, A2 and B1, B2, referred to as A/B flight training. A training included theoretical and practical training in aerobatics, navigation, long-distance flights and dead-stick landings. The B courses included high-altitude flights, instrument flights, night landings and training to handle the aircraft in difficult situations.) he was posted to the 5. Staffel (5th squadron) of Jagdgeschwader 52 (JG 52—52nd Fighter Wing) in the fall of 1942. At the time, this squadron was officially commanded by Oberleutnant Siegfried Simsch who was on home leave recovering from wounds sustained on 29 May. 5. Staffel was a squadron of II. Gruppe (2nd group) of JG 52 commanded by Hauptmann Johannes Steinhoff.

=== War against the Soviet Union ===
II./JG 52 insignia

World War II in Europe had begun on Friday 1 September 1939 when German forces invaded Poland. Germany had launched Operation Barbarossa, the invasion of the Soviet Union on 22 June 1941. A year later, German forces launched Operation Fridericus II, the attack on Kupiansk, a preliminary operation to Case Blue, the strategic 1942 summer offensive in southern Russia. In August 1942, II. Gruppe was subordinated to VIII. Fliegerkorps and supported the 6th Army offensive to capture Stalingrad. On 6 September, II. Gruppe reached an airfield named Gonschtakowka located north-northeast of Mozdok on the Terek in the Caucasus.

Fönnekold claimed his first aerial victory on 7 September when he shot down a Lavochkin-Gorbunov-Gudkov LaGG-3 fighter. The Gruppe then moved to Maykop located in the North Caucasus on 21 September where, with the exception of 24 to 29 October, they were based until 26 November. Operating from Maykop, Fönnekold claimed his second aerial victory, an Ilyushin Il-2 ground-attack aircraft shot down on 6 October. There, he claimed three further aerial victories over LaGG-3 fighters, one each on 29 October, 15 and 19 November. On 19 November, Soviet forces launched Operation Uranus which led to the encirclement of Axis forces in the vicinity of Stalingrad. To support the German forces fighting in the Battle of Stalingrad forced the Luftwaffe to relocate its forces and ordered II. Gruppe to move from Maykop to Morozovsk, located approximately 200 kilometers (120 miles) west of Stalingrad, on 26 November. There, Fönnekold claimed another LaGG-3 fighter shot down on 11 December before the Gruppe moved to Zimovniki the following day.

On 17 December, II. Gruppe relocated again, this time to Kotelnikovo where they stayed until 26 December. Operating from Kotelnikovo, Fönnekold claimed a Lavochkin La-5 fighter shot down on 22 December and another on 25 December. On 22 January 1943, II. Gruppe had to retreat further and moved to an airfield at Rostov-on-Don where Fönnekold shot down a LaGG-3 fighter on 30 January. On 7 February 1943, the Gruppe moved to Kuteinykove near Stalino, present-day Donetsk, where Fönnekold claimed two Yakovlev Yak-1 the following day.

=== Kuban bridgehead and Crimea ===
The Gruppe was moved to the combat area of the Kuban bridgehead on 10 February 1943 where it was initially based at an airfield at Slavyansk-na-Kubani. Due to whether conditions, II. Gruppe then moved to Kerch on 16 February. While based at Slavyansk-na-Kubani, Fönnekold claimed two Polikarpov I-16 fighters shot down on 14 February and a Polikarpov I-153 biplane fighter on 27 February. On 13 March, the Gruppe moved to Anapa located on the northern coast of the Black Sea near the Sea of Azov and was fighting in the Battle of the Caucasus.

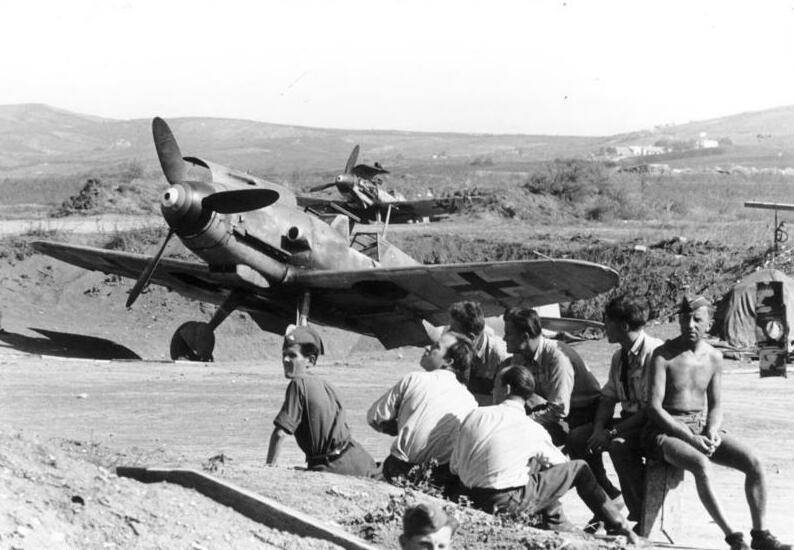
Bf 109s of II./JG 52 at Anapa

On 8 May, Leutnant Helmut Haberda, who had led 5. Staffel since Simsch was injured in November 1942, was killed in action. In consequence Oberleutnant Wilhelm Batz was appointed Staffelkapitän (Squadron Leader) of the Staffel on 9 May. That day, Fönnekold claimed a LaGG-3 fighter shot down. By 31 May, he claimed ten further aerial victories, increasing his total to 28 aerial victories. In June, Fönnekold added seven more claims, reaching 35 aerial victories. While in July the bulk of the Luftwaffe fighter force was being concentrated further north and fought in the Battle of Kursk, II. Gruppe with some exceptions remained at Anapa. Here, Fönnekold claimed further aerial victories, reaching 39 claims by end of July and 49 claims by end of August. Fönnekold was awarded the Honour Goblet of the Luftwaffe (Ehrenpokal der Luftwaffe) on 9 August and the German Cross in Gold (Deutsches Kreuz in Gold) on 16 August 1943.

On 1 September, II. Gruppe was made complete again, reuniting with all three Staffeln at a makeshift airfield named Karlowka located approximately 50 kilometers (31 miles) east of Poltava. There, Fönnekold claimed four aerial victories total. On 6, 7 and 8 September he claimed an Il-2 ground-attack aircraft shot down, and on 10 September he was credited with the destruction of a Yak-1 fighter, taking his total to 53 claims. On 1 October, the Gruppe moved to an airfield at Nove Zaporizhzhya located approximately 15 kilometers (9.3 miles) west of Zaporizhzhia. The Gruppe relocated to an airfield named Beresowka near the Inhulets, located approximately halfway between Kremenchuk and Kirovohrad. They remained at Beresowka until 25 October when the Gruppe moved to Fedorivka, a small village 17 kilometers (11 miles) north-northwest of Melitopol. Two days later, the Gruppe was ordered to Askania-Nova. By the end of October 1943, Fönnekold's number of aerial victories claimed had increased to 65, making him the second most successful and still living fighter pilot in II. Gruppe at the time. The Gruppe had moved to Kherson on 30 October and then transferred to Baherove on the Crimean peninsula where they were based until 19 March 1944.

Based at Baherove, Fönnekold increased his number of aerial victories to 80 by end November and to 92 aerial victory claims by the end of 1943. On 12 January 1944, Fönnekold claimed three aerial victories, including his 100th aerial victory in total. (Note: According to Page, Fönnekold claimed his 100th aerial victory on 18 January 1944.) He was the 62nd Luftwaffe pilot to achieve the century mark. Fönnekold was awarded the Knight's Cross of the Iron Cross (Ritterkreuz des Eisernen Kreuzes) on 26 March 1944. On 8 April, Soviet forces launched the Crimean offensive, forcing the Germans to evacuate the Crimea. By this date, Fönnekold had accumulated 116 aerial victories.

=== Squadron leader and death ===
On 14 April 1944, II. Gruppe moved to an airfield at Chersonesus at Sevastopol where they were based until 9 May. On 19 April, Fönnekold was appointed Staffelkapitän of 5. Staffel of JG 52 when its former commander, Batz, was appointed Gruppenkommandeur of III. Gruppe of JG 52. The Gruppe was transferred to Huși at the Prut River on 27 May 1944. There, on 30 May, Fönnekold became an "ace-in-a-day" when claimed seven Bell P-39 Airacobra fighters and a single Yak-1 fighter shot down near Tudora and Iași. Included in this figure are three claims over P-39 fighters from 129 GvIAP (Guards Fighter Aviation Regiment—Gvardeyskiy Istrebitelny Aviatsionny Polk). On 9 July, aerial combat with two Yakovlev Yak-9 fighters resulted in a forced landing of his Messerschmitt Bf 109 G-6 (Werknummer 163564—factory number) near Iași.

On 29 August, III. Gruppe relocated to an airfield at Budak, present-day Budacu de Sus and part of Dumitrița. Fönnekold claimed three United States Army Air Forces (USAAF) North American P-51 Mustang fighters shot down near Luieriu (Lövér) on 31 August. Later that day, he was bounced during his landing approach at Ssaß-Budak by P-51 fighters. One of the .50 caliber projectiles penetrated his heart while taxiing his Bf 109 G-6 (Werknummer 441931) "black 9". He was succeeded by Heinrich Sturm as commander of 5. Staffel. Fönnekold was buried on the cemetery at Ssaß-Budak. Posthumously, he was promoted to Oberleutnant (first lieutenant).

== Summary of career ==
=== Aerial victory claims ===
According to US historian David T. Zabecki, Fönnekold was credited with 136 aerial victories. Spick also lists Fönnekold with 136 aerial victories claimed in approximately 600 combat missions. Mathews and Foreman, authors of Luftwaffe Aces — Biographies and Victory Claims, researched the German Federal Archives and found records for 134 confirmed and three unconfirmed aerial victories. All these victories were claimed on the Eastern Front.

Victory claims were logged to a map-reference (PQ = Planquadrat), for example "PQ 54512". The Luftwaffe grid map (Jägermeldenetz) covered all of Europe, western Russia and North Africa and was composed of rectangles measuring 15 minutes of latitude by 30 minutes of longitude, an area of about 360 square miles (930 km^{2}). These sectors were then subdivided into 36 smaller units to give a location area 3 km × 4 km (1.9 mi × 2.5 mi) in size.

Chronicle of aerial victories
This and the ♠ (Ace of spades) indicates those aerial victories which made Fönnekold an "ace-in-a-day", a term which designates a fighter pilot who has shot down five or more airplanes in a single day. This and the – (dash) indicates unconfirmed aerial victory claims for which Fönnekold did not receive credit. This and the ? (question mark) indicates information discrepancies listed by Barbas, Prien, Stemmer, Rodeike, Bock, Mathews and Foreman.
Claim	Date	Time	Type	Location	Claim	Date	Time	Type	Location
– 5. Staffel of Jagdgeschwader 52 – Eastern Front — September 1942 – 3 February 1943
1	7 September 1942	09:27	LaGG-3	PQ 54512	6	11 December 1942	12:45	LaGG-3	PQ 49381; 25 km (16 mi) south of Basargino
2	6 October 1942	12:35	Il-2	PQ 96733; 25 km (16 mi) east-northeast of Tuapse	7	22 December 1942	11:32	La-5	PQ 49712; 65 km (40 mi) south-southeast of Stalingrad
3	29 October 1942	15:40	LaGG-3	PQ 95873; 10 km (6.2 mi) east of Lazarevskoye	8	25 December 1942	11:22	La-5	PQ 49773; 15 km (9.3 mi) east of Aksay
4	15 November 1942	08:50	LaGG-3	PQ 94194	9	30 January 1943	14:52	LaGG-3	PQ 06391
5	19 November 1942	12:50	LaGG-3	PQ 94634					
– 5. Staffel of Jagdgeschwader 52 – Eastern Front — 4 February – 31 December 1943
10	8 February 1943	09:35	Yak-1	PQ 44 Ost 09333	52	8 September 1943	05:27	Il-2 m.H. (Note: The "m.H." refers to an Ilyushin Il-2 with rear gunner (mit Heckschütze).)	PQ 35 Ost 60521; 20 km (12 mi) west of Andreyevka
11	8 February 1943	09:50	Yak-1	PQ 34 Ost 99664; 5 km (3.1 mi) east of Rovenki	53	10 September 1943	12:33	Yak-1	PQ 35 Ost 50283; 10 km (6.2 mi) west of Merefa
12	14 February 1943	11:00	I-16	PQ 34 Ost 7526	54	12 October 1943	07:40	P-39	PQ 34 Ost 49173; 55 km (34 mi) east-northeast of Mironovka
13	14 February 1943	11:03	I-16	PQ 34 Ost 75232 north of Krymsk	55	15 October 1943	05:50	Yak-1	PQ 35 Ost 10123; 10 km (6.2 mi) south of Pereiaslav-Khmelnytskyi
14	27 February 1943	06:02	I-153	PQ 34 Ost 85344 vicinity of Aberbijewka	56	15 October 1943	05:58	Yak-1	PQ 35 Ost 10121; 10 km (6.2 mi) south of Pereiaslav-Khmelnytskyi
15	6 May 1943	05:38	La-5	PQ 34 Ost 75293, 8 km (5.0 mi) northwest of Neberdschajewskaja northeast of Novorossiysk	57	19 October 1943	11:07	Il-2 m.H.	PQ 34 Ost 39424; 25 km (16 mi) east-northeast of Mironovka
16	6 May 1943	11:30	La-5	PQ 34 Ost 85153 vicinity of Abinsk	58	20 October 1943	10:10	Pe-2	PQ 34 Ost 39181, north of Petrowka; 15 km (9.3 mi) northeast of Alexandrija
17	6 May 1943	12:05	Yak-1	PQ 34 Ost 76894 vicinity of Kijewakoje	59	20 October 1943	12:55	Il-2 m.H.	PQ 34 Ost 39332, north of Krasnaja-Fedorowka; 10 km (6.2 mi) northeast of Mironovka
18	9 May 1943	16:10	LaGG-3	PQ 34 Ost 86754 east of Trojzkaja	60	20 October 1943	12:57	Il-2 m.H.	PQ 34 Ost 39412; 20 km (12 mi) northeast of Mironovka
19	15 May 1943	18:40	Yak-1	southwest of Kabardinka	61	20 October 1943	12:58	Il-2 m.H.	PQ 34 Ost 39284; 30 km (19 mi) east-northeast of Mironovka
20	19 May 1943	07:20? (Note: According to Mathews and Foreman claimed at 07:26.)	LaGG-3	PQ 34 Ost 85313 southeast of Schapssugskaja	62	21 October 1943	06:50	P-39	PQ 34 Ost 39631; 20 km (12 mi) east of Pjatichatki
21	21 May 1943	04:23	R-5	PQ 34 Ost 96771; 10 km (6.2 mi) east of Krasnodar	63	21 October 1943	14:45	P-39	PQ 34 Ost 39674 vicinity of Piatykhatky
22	21 May 1943	15:42	U-2	PQ 34 Ost 96784; 20 km (12 mi) east of Krasnodar	64	25 October 1943	12:28	Yak-1	PQ 34 Ost 57151; 5 km (3.1 mi) northwest of Melitopol
23	21 May 1943	15:46	U-2	PQ 34 Ost 96774; 10 km (6.2 mi) east of Krasnodar	65	28 October 1943	14:38	Il-2 m.H.	PQ 34 Ost 47154; 30 km (19 mi) northwest of Ivanovka
24	28 May 1943	10:38	Yak-1	PQ 34 Ost 76893, southeast of Kijewskoje south of Bakanskij	66	2 November 1943	14:40	Il-2 m.H.	PQ 34 Ost 66734, 5 km (3.1 mi) southeast of Eltigen
25	29 May 1943	04:37	LaGG-3	north of Krymskaja north of Krymsk	67	3 November 1943	11:20	R-5	PQ 34 Ost 66644 east of Bakssy
26	29 May 1943	18:30	Yak-1	PQ 34 Ost 76894 vicinity of Kijewakoje	68	4 November 1943	12:37	Il-2 m.H.	PQ 34 Ost 66644 east of Bakssy
27	30 May 1943	15:36	B-25	PQ 34 Ost 76861 north of Kessjetowa	69	5 November 1943	10:24	Il-2 m.H.	PQ 34 Ost 66842 southwest of Tamanj
28	31 May 1943	05:25	LaGG-3	PQ 34 Ost 86772 south of Trojzkaja	70	5 November 1943	10:37	Yak-1	PQ 34 Ost 66732, east of Eltigen vicinity of Tobetschik
29	1 June 1943	08:48	Yak-1	PQ 34 Ost 76861; Sea of Azov	71	6 November 1943	09:03	Yak-1	PQ 34 Ost 66671, east of Kerch east of Kerch
30	6 June 1943	05:03	La-5	PQ 34 Ost 75231, northwest of Krymskaja northwest of Krymsk	72	6 November 1943	06:06	Yak-1	PQ 34 Ost 66644 east of Bakssy
31	7 June 1943	15:21? (Note: According to Mathews and Foreman claimed at 15:23.)	P-39	PQ 34 Ost 76822 west of Kalabatka	73	12 November 1943	10:27? (Note: According to Mathews and Foreman claimed at 10:17.)	Il-2 m.H.	PQ 34 Ost 66641, northwest of Bakssy east of Bulganak
32	7 June 1943	15:25? (Note: According to Mathews and Foreman claimed at 15:27.)	P-39	PQ 34 Ost 76812 vicinity of Kalabatka	74	14 November 1943	14:03	Il-2 m.H.	PQ 34 Ost 66643, Kolonka east of Bakssy
33	10 June 1943	14:42	Yak-1	PQ 34 Ost 75473; Black Sea, 25 km (16 mi) southwest of Novorossiysk	75	21 November 1943	13:00	Yak-1	PQ 34 Ost 66562, south of Bulganag vicinity of Babtschik
34	15 June 1943	17:07	Yak-1	PQ 34 Ost 85373, south of Gelendzhik vicinity of Gelendzhik	76	27 November 1943	08:39	Yak-1	PQ 34 Ost 66732, east of Eltigen vicinity of Tobetschik
35	25 June 1943	04:37? (Note: According to Mathews and Foreman claimed at 04:17.)	Yak-1	PQ 34 Ost 85371 vicinity of Gelendzhik	77	27 November 1943	08:56	Yak-1	PQ 34 Ost 66641, northwest of Bakssz east of Bulganak
36	21 July 1943	04:32	Yak-1	PQ 34 Ost 88261 vicinity of Jalisawehino	78	28 November 1943	08:42	Il-2 m.H.	PQ 34 Ost 66594 vicinity of Kamysch-Burun
37	23 July 1943	17:40? (Note: According to Mathews and Foreman claimed at 18:40.)	LaGG-3	PQ 34 Ost 88424; 20 km (12 mi) south of Jalisawehino	79	28 November 1943	08:50	Il-2 m.H.	PQ 34 Ost 66732, east of Eltigen vicinity of Tobetschik
38	25 July 1943	07:44	Yak-1	PQ 34 Ost 98173; 40 km (25 mi) southwest of Rovenki	80	28 November 1943	11:40	Il-2 m.H.	PQ 34 Ost 66813, west of Taman over sea, vicinity of Cape Tusla
39	31 July 1943	06:14	Il-2	PQ 34 Ost 88232; 30 km (19 mi) west-southwest of Rovenki	81	1 December 1943	07:22	Il-2	PQ 34 Ost 66732, east of Eltigen vicinity of Tobetschik
40	2 August 1943	18:10	Il-2 m.H.	PQ 34 Ost 88621, northeast of Marinowka vicinity of Jalisawehino	82	1 December 1943	13:45	Pe-2	north of Eltigen
41	7 August 1943	07:38	Il-2 m.H.	PQ 34 Ost 75233, Kijewskoje west of Krymsk	83	2 December 1943	14:20	LaGG-3	east of Eltigen
42	7 August 1943	07:45	Spitfire	PQ 34 Ost 76892, northeast of Kijewskoje vicinity of Kijewskoje	84	2 December 1943	14:26	Il-2 m.H.	southeast of Eltigen
43	7 August 1943	17:25	Il-2 m.H.	PQ 34 Ost 75261, Krymskaja north of Nowo-Bakanskaja	85	4 December 1943	07:08	Il-2 m.H.	east of Eltigen
44	9 August 1943	08:17	Spitfire	PQ 34 Ost 75234, 5 km (3.1 mi) west of Moldawanskoje vicinity of Krymsk	86	4 December 1943	07:17	LaGG-3	south-southwest of Eltigen
45	9 August 1943	08:22	Yak-1	PQ 34 Ost 75292, 4 km (2.5 mi) south of Nebershajewskaja northeast of Noworossijsi	87	4 December 1943	11:02	Il-2 m.H.	southeast of Eltigen
46	9 August 1943	08:25	Il-2 m.H.	PQ 34 Ost 75261, 8 km (5.0 mi) northeast of Moldawanskoje north of Nowo-Bakanskaja	88	4 December 1943	11:12	Il-2 m.H.	southwest of Eltigen
47	26 August 1943	15:42	LaGG-3	PQ 34 Ost 76863, northwest of Kijewskoje north of Kessjetowa	89	5 December 1943	13:20	P-39	southwest of Eltigen
48	26 August 1943	15:47	LaGG-3	PQ 34 Ost 85114, north of Abinskaja vicinity of Mertschanskaja	90	8 December 1943	13:53	Il-2 m.H.	south of Kolonka
49	31 August 1943	12:14	P-39	PQ 34 Ost 88671; 25 km (16 mi) west-northwest of Taganrog	91	8 December 1943	13:59	Il-2	PQ 34 Ost 66671, east of Kerch
50	6 September 1943	10:02	Il-2 m.H.	PQ 35 Ost 60174 vicinity west of Merefa	92	11 December 1943	09:11	Yak-1	east of Eltigen north of Taman
51	7 September 1943	09:19	Il-2 m.H.	PQ 35 Ost 60522; 20 km (12 mi) west of Andreyevka					
– 5. Staffel of Jagdgeschwader 52 – Eastern Front — 1 January – 31 August 1944
93	4 January 1944	06:43	Il-2	Cape Khroni	116	23 March 1944	07:03	unknown	Cape Khroni
94	9 January 1944	12:01	P-39	Adzhimushkay	117♠	30 May 1944	10:35	P-39	vicinity of Iași vicinity of Sulani
95	9 January 1944	14:40	LaGG-3	PQ 66614 vicinity of Majak-Bakny	118♠	30 May 1944	11:05	P-39	PQ 78642; 10 km (6.2 mi) south of Tudora
96	10 January 1944	09:45	Il-2	vicinity of Bulganak	119♠	30 May 1944	13:50	P-39	vicinity of Iași; 10 km (6.2 mi) south of Iași
97	10 January 1944	11:50	Yak-1	vicinity of Grammatikowo	120♠	30 May 1944	14:08	P-39	vicinity of Huși; 8 km (5.0 mi) north of Iași
98	11 January 1944	13:32	LaGG-3	Adzhimushkay	121♠	30 May 1944	14:12	P-39	vicinity of Iași; 10 km (6.2 mi) south of Iași
99	12 January 1944	06:50	Boston	PQ 66611 vicinity of Cape Khroni	122♠	30 May 1944	14:41	P-39	PQ 78671; 15 km (9.3 mi) north of Iași
100	12 January 1944	13:46	P-39	Cape Tarchan	123? (Note: This claim is not listed by Mathews and Foreman.)	30 May 1944	17:51	Yak-1	vicinity of Huși
101	12 January 1944	14:06	Il-2	PQ 66614 vicinity of Majak-Bakny	124♠	30 May 1944	17:52	P-39	PQ 78644; 10 km (6.2 mi) north of Tudora
102	13 January 1944	07:26	Yak-1	Adzhimushkay	125	31 May 1944	04:12	Yak-1	PQ 78674; 8 km (5.0 mi) north of Iași
103	17 January 1944	10:40	P-39	Cape Tarchan	126	31 May 1944	12:45	P-39	PQ 78673; 15 km (9.3 mi) north of Iași
104	19 January 1944	12:10	Il-2	PQ 66642; Majak	127	2 June 1944	09:03	Boston	PQ 78634; 15 km (9.3 mi) northwest of Iași
105	23 January 1944	06:47	Il-2	PQ 66652; Malikut	128	2 June 1944	13:50	Il-2	PQ 78732; 15 km (9.3 mi) northwest of Iași
106	25 January 1944	12:37	Boston	PQ 66673; Kossa Tulsa	129	27 June 1944	04:48? (Note: According to Mathews and Foreman claimed at 04:08.)	Yak-7	PQ 7924
107	28 January 1944	12:07	Yak-1	north of Kerch	130	4 August 1944	11:20	Il-2	PQ 11595; 15 km (9.3 mi) northeast of Mielec
108	28 January 1944	15:01	Il-2	vicinity of Kerch	131	5 August 1944	11:05	P-39	PQ 11644 vicinity of Mielec
109	5 February 1944	06:26	P-39	vicinity of Kerch	132	21 August 1944	18:40	La-5	20 km (12 mi) northeast of Leipzig
110	7 February 1944	06:56	P-39	vicinity of Bulganak	133	22 August 1944	07:16	La-5? (Note: According to Mathews and Foreman claimed as a Yakovlev Yak-9.)	PQ 97524; 30 km (19 mi) east-northeast of Leipzig
111	7 February 1944	13:28? (Note: According to Mathews and Foreman claimed at 13:25.)	Yak-1	PQ 66673 vicinity of Kossa Tulsa	134	22 August 1944	13:25	Yak-7	PQ 87662; 25 km (16 mi) east-northeast of Szekszárd
112	10 February 1944	08:00	Yak-9	PQ 66514 west of Dsheilaw	135	23 August 1944	17:26	Yak-7	PQ 87828; 20 km (12 mi) near Leipzig
113	14 March 1944	12:55	Pe-2	PQ 47793; 30 km (19 mi) southwest of Genitschek	—	31 August 1944	—	P-51	vicinity of Luieriu (Lövér)
114	22 March 1944	10:55	Yak-7	Cape Tarchan	—	31 August 1944	—	P-51	vicinity of Luieriu (Lövér)
115	22 March 1944	11:00	Yak-7	Adzhimushkay	—	31 August 1944	—	P-51	vicinity of Luieriu (Lövér)

=== Awards ===
- Iron Cross (1939) 2nd and 1st Class
- Honor Goblet of the Luftwaffe on 9 August 1943 as Feldwebel and pilot
- German Cross in Gold on 16 August 1943 as Feldwebel in the 5./Jagdgeschwader 52 (Note: According to Obermaier on 6 September 1943.)
- Knight's Cross of the Iron Cross on 26 March 1944 as Leutnant and pilot in the II./Jagdgeschwader 52
