= Budușel =

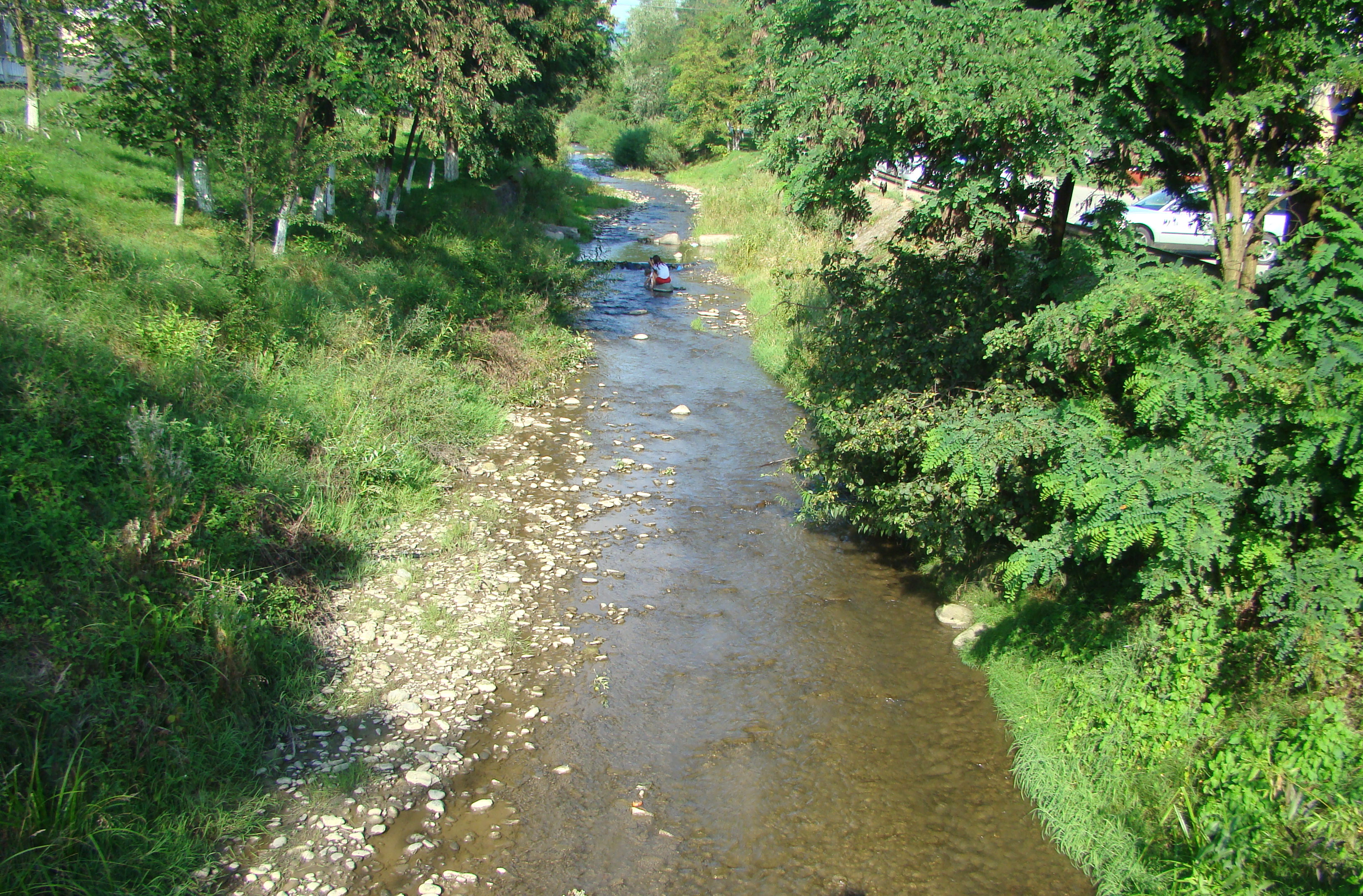

- Location within Romania

Location
- Country: Romania
- Counties: Bistrița-Năsăud County
- Villages: Cușma, Satu Nou

Physical characteristics
- Mouth: Budac
  - coordinates: 47.1069°N 24.5903°E
- Length: 17 km (11 mi)
- Basin size: 68 km^{2} (26 sq mi)

Basin features
- Progression: Budac→ Șieu→ Someșul Mare→ Someș→ Tisza→ Danube→ Black Sea
- Tributaries
  - left: Petriș

The Budușel is a right tributary of the river Budac in Romania. It flows into the Budac near Orheiu Bistriţei. Its length is 17 km (11 mi) and its basin size is 68 km^{2} (26 sq mi).
