= Budac =

- Location within Romania

Location
- Country: Romania
- Counties: Bistrița-Năsăud County
- Villages: Dumitrița, Orheiu Bistriţei, Budacu de Jos

Physical characteristics
- Mouth: Șieu
  - location: Monariu
  - coordinates: 47.0510°N 24.4472°E
- Length: 44 km (27 mi)
- Basin size: 241 km^{2} (93 sq mi)

Basin features
- Progression: Șieu→ Someșul Mare→ Someș→ Tisza→ Danube→ Black Sea
- Tributaries
  - left: Șes, Buduș
  - right: Bolovan, Budușel

The Budac is a right tributary of the river Șieu in Romania. Its source is in the Călimani Mountains. It flows through the villages Budacu de Sus, Dumitrița, Orheiu Bistriţei and Budacu de Jos and discharges into the Șieu near Monariu. Its length is 44 km (27 mi) and its basin size is 241 km^{2} (93 sq mi).
