= Dacian fortress of Monariu =

- Location within Romania
- 47.0755°N 24.4610°E
- Location: Cetate and Monariu, Bistrița-Năsăud County, Romania

Site notes
- Condition: Ruined

The so-called Monariu Dacian fortress is the name of the ruined remnants of a Dacian fortified town in Cetate and Monariu, both in Bistrița-Năsăud County, in northern Romania. The actual historical name of the ruined settlement is unknown.
