= Nösnerland =

Historic region of Transylvania

On this map, the Nösnerland is the green area to the north of the main Transylvanian Saxon settlements, centered on Bistrița/Bistritz (also known under its archaic standard German form as Nösen).

The Nösnerland (also known as Nösnergau; Romanian: Țara Năsăudului; Hungarian: Beszterce vidéke) is a historic region of northeastern Transylvania in present-day Romania centered between the Bistrița and Mureș rivers. In today's administrative boundaries, it is located in southern Bistrița-Năsăud County and north-central Mureș County.

== History ==
Beginning in the 12th century and increasingly in the 13th–14th centuries, Hungarian kings invited German colonists (mainly from present-day Luxembourg and the adjacent areas in western contemporary Germany) to settle in the then eastern lands of the Kingdom of Hungary; these German settlers became collectively known as the Transylvanian Saxons (German: Siebenbürger Sachsen). The Saxons in the southeast settled in the Burzenland, while the settlers in the northeast established towns along the Bistrița and Mureș rivers beginning in the early 13th century. As the latter settlers' first major town in the area was Nösen on the Bistrița in 1206, the surrounding area became known as the Nösnerland. The largest cities of this region were Nösen, later known as Bistritz (Bistrița in Romanian), in the north and Sächsisch-Regen (Reghin in Romanian) in the south.

During World War II, after Romania switched sides to the Allies as a result of King Michael's Coup of 23 August 1944, the German military ordered in September 1944 the evacuation of the German population from Northern Transylvania. After the Romanian Revolution and the fall of the Communist regime in 1989, additional Transylvanian Germans emigrated from their homeland to Germany.

== Towns and villages ==
In each case, the modern Romanian name is given first, followed by the historic German and Hungarian names.

- Albeștii Bistriței (Weißkirch bei Bistritz, Kisfehéregyház)
- Arcalia (Kallesdorf, Árokalja)
- Batoș (Botsch, Bátos)
- Bistrița (Nösen / Bistritz, Beszterce)
- Budacu de Jos (Deutsch-Budak, Szászbudak)
- Chiraleș (Kyrieleis, Kerlés)
- Corvinești (Niederneudorf, Kékesújfalu)
- Cușma (Auen / Kuschma, Kusma)
- Dedrad (Deutsch-Zepling, Dedrád)
- Dipșa (Dürrbach, Dipse)
- Domnești (Attelsdorf / Billak, Bilak)
- Dorolea (Kleinbistritz, Aszubeszterce)
- Dumitra (Mettersdorf, Szentdemeter)
- Dumitrița (Waltersdorf, Kisdemeter)
- Ghinda (Windau, Vinda)
- Herina (Mönchsdorf, Harina)
- Ideciu de Jos (Niedereidisch, Alsóidecs)
- Ideciu de Sus (Obereidisch, Felsőidecs)
- Jelna (Senndorf, Kiszsolna)
- Lechința (Lechnitz, Szászlekence)
- Livezile (Jaad, Jád)
- Logig (Ludwigsdorf, Ludvég)
- Monariu (Minarken, Malomárka)
- Moruț (Moritzdorf, Aranyosmóric)
- Năsăud (Nußdorf / Nassod, Naszód)
- Orheiu Bistriţei (Burghalle, Óvárhely)
- Petelea (Birk, Petele)
- Petriș (Petersdorf bei Bistritz, Petres)
- Posmuș (Paßbusch, Paszmos)
- Reghin (Sächsisch-Regen, Szászrégen)
- Sângeorzu Nou (Sankt Georgen bei Lechnitz, Szászszentgyörgy)
- Sâniacob (Jakobsdorf bei Bitritz, Szászszentjakab)
- Satu Nou (Oberneudorf, Felsőszászújfalu)
- Sigmir (Schönbirk, Szépnyír)
- Slătinița (Pintak, Pinták)
- Șieu (Groß-Schogen, Nagysajó)
- Șieu-Măgheruș (Ungersdorf, Sajómagyarós)
- Tărpiu (Treppen, Szásztörpény)
- Teaca (Tekendorf, Teke)
- Tonciu (Tatsch, Tacs)
- Uila (Weilau, Vajola)
- Unirea (Wallendorf, Aldorf)
- Vermeș (Wermesch, Vermes)
- Viile Tecii (Großeidau, Kolozsnagyida)
- Viișoara (Heidendorf, Besenyő)

== See also ==
- Burzenland
- Carpathian Germans
- Danube Swabians
- Transylvanian Saxons
