= Transylvanian Landler dialect =

German dialect from Transylvania

Transylvanian Landler
- Landlerisch
- Native to: Romania (Note: Also spoken in Germany and Austria by a few hundred people.)
- Region: Sibiu County (German: Kreis Hermannstadt), Transylvania (German: Siebenbürgen or Transsilvanien)
- Native speakers: c. 1,500 worldwide
- Language family: Indo-European: Germanic; West Germanic; Elbe Germanic; (High German); Upper German; Bavarian; Southern Bavarian; Transylvanian Landler

Language codes
- ISO 639-3: –
- Glottolog: land1263

Transylvanian Landler (German: Siebenbürgisch Landlerisch) is a Bavarian dialect of the Transylvanian Landler (German: Siebenbürger Landler) community who lives in Sibiu County (German: Kreis Hermannstadt) in southern Transylvania, central Romania. It is estimated that approximately 1,500 people speak this dialect of Bavarian at a native level.

== Geographical location ==
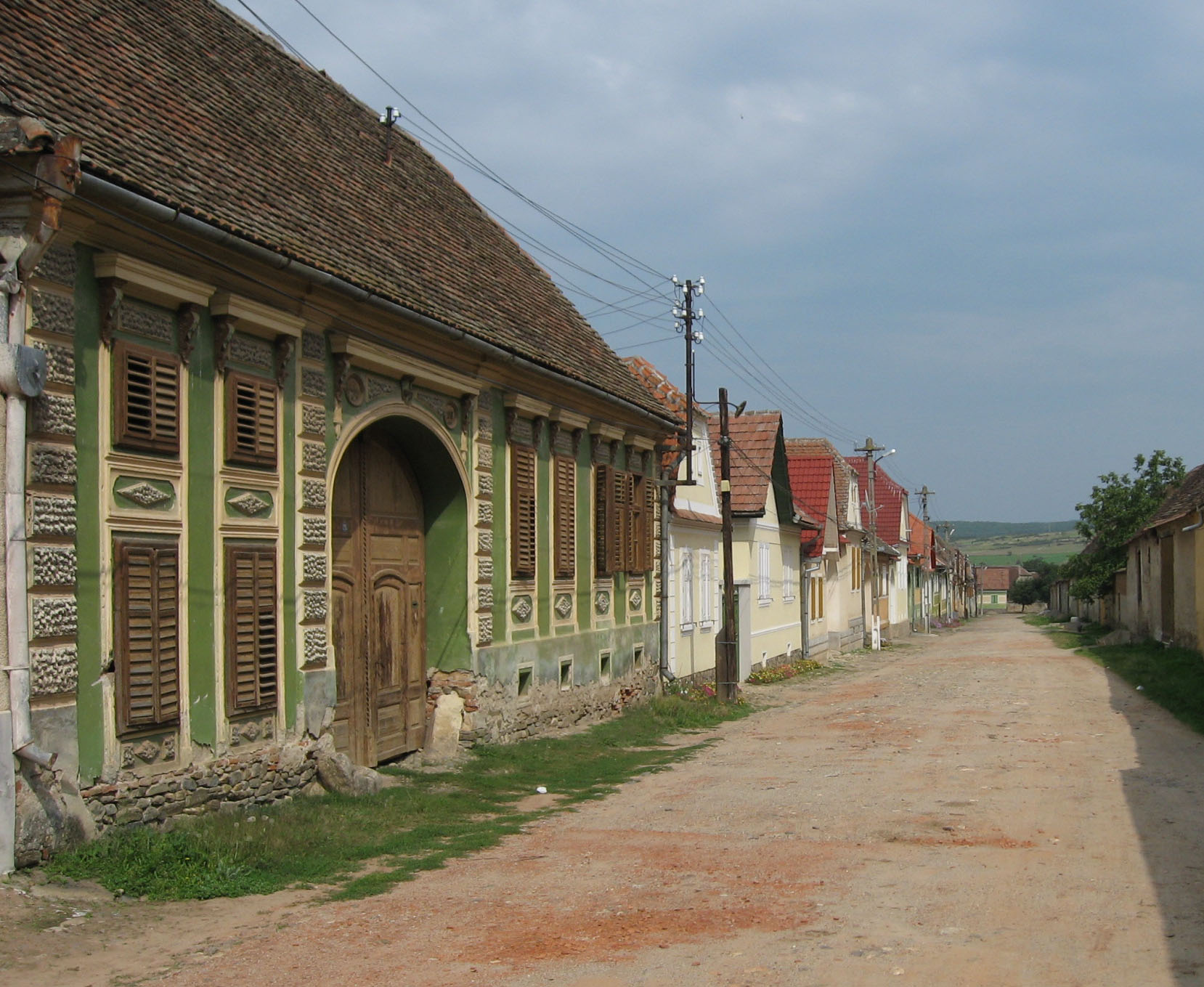
Apoldu de Sus (German: Großpold), where a sizable Transylvanian Landler community lived in the past.

Traditionally, it has been spoken in several communes situated in Sibiu County where in the past Austrian Protestants (more specifically Evangelical Lutherans) expelled from the Salzkammergut area were allowed to settle. These communes are: Großau (Romanian: Cristian), Großpold (Romanian: Apoldu de Sus), and Neppendorf (Romanian: Turnișor).

The ancestors of the Transylvanian Landlers stem from Upper Austria (German: Oberösterreich), Styria (German: Steiermark), and Carinthia (German: Kärnten). The Transylvanian Landler dialect was also spoken by 40 native speakers in Sebeș (German: Mühlbach), Alba County in the past. Consequently, the Transylvanian Landlers were surrounded mostly by Romanian speakers and Transylvanian Saxons (which subsequently influenced their dialect as well).

The Transylvanian Landler community has been living in Sibiu County since the mid 18th century onwards. It is considered an endangered German dialect as it is mostly spoken by 200 older people in Transylvania and a few hundred in Germany. Aside from Transylvanian Landler, the Transylvanian Landlers also speak:

- Standard High German;
- Transylvanian Saxon;
- Romanian.

== Number of speakers in the past ==
In the past, during the early 20th century and more specifically during the 1930s, it is estimated that the total number of Transylvanian Landler speakers in their three rural communities in southern Transylvania peaked at 6,000. This number, however, has gradually dwindled to a very tiny minority to the present-day, when it is estimated that this German dialect is spoken by approximately 1,500 people worldwide.
