= Livezile, Bistrița-Năsăud =

Livezile
- Commune
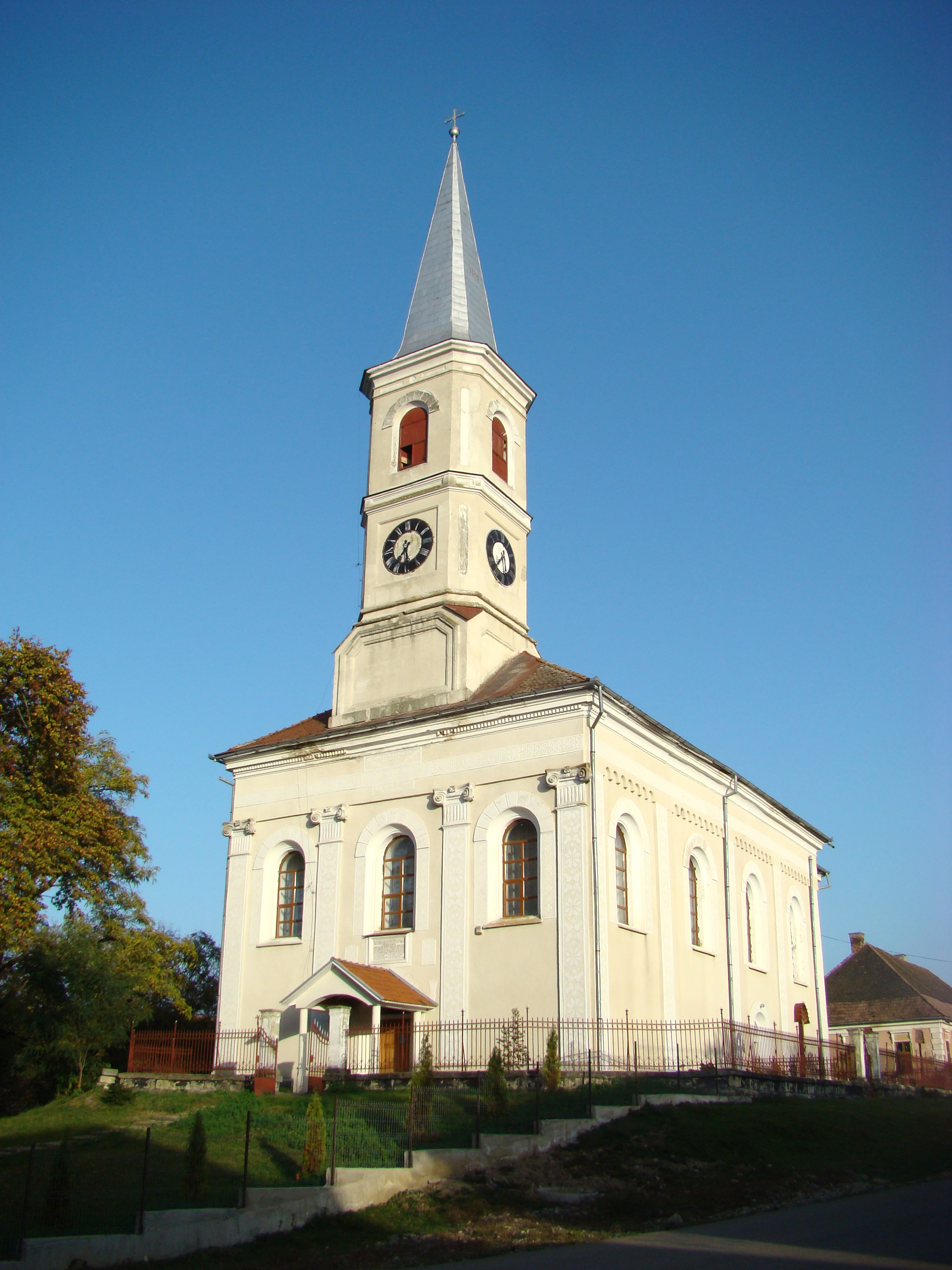
- Church in Dorolea

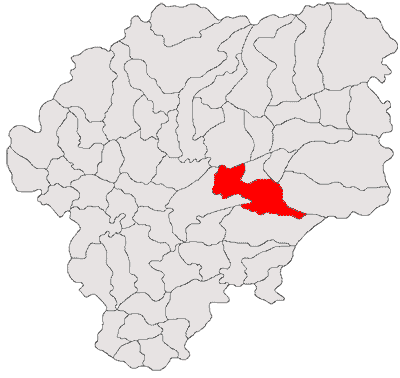
- Location in Bistrița-Năsăud County

- Location in Romania
- Coordinates: 47°10′47″N 24°34′16″E
- Country: Romania
- County: Bistrița-Năsăud

Government
  - Mayor (2024–2028): Traian Simionca (PSD)
- Area: 109.41 km^{2} (42.24 sq mi)
- Elevation: 415 m (1,362 ft)
- Population (2021-12-01): 4,952
  - Density: 45.26/km^{2} (117.2/sq mi)
- Time zone: UTC+02:00 (EET)
  - Summer (DST): UTC+03:00 (EEST)
- Postal code: 427120
- Area code: +(40) x59
- Vehicle reg.: BN
- Website: www.primarialivezilebn.ro

Livezile (until 1964 Iad; Hungarian: Jád; German: Jaad; Transylvanian Saxon: Goot or Gôt) is a commune located in Bistrița-Năsăud County, Transylvania, Romania.

It is composed of five villages: Cușma (Kusma; Kuschma or Kusen or Auen), Dorolea (Aszúbeszterce or Kisbeszterce; Klein-Bistritz; Transylvanian Saxon: Bästärz), Dumbrava (Dumbráva), Livezile, and Valea Poenii (Bureaka).
