= Turnișor =

Coordinates: 45.7931°N 24.1250°E

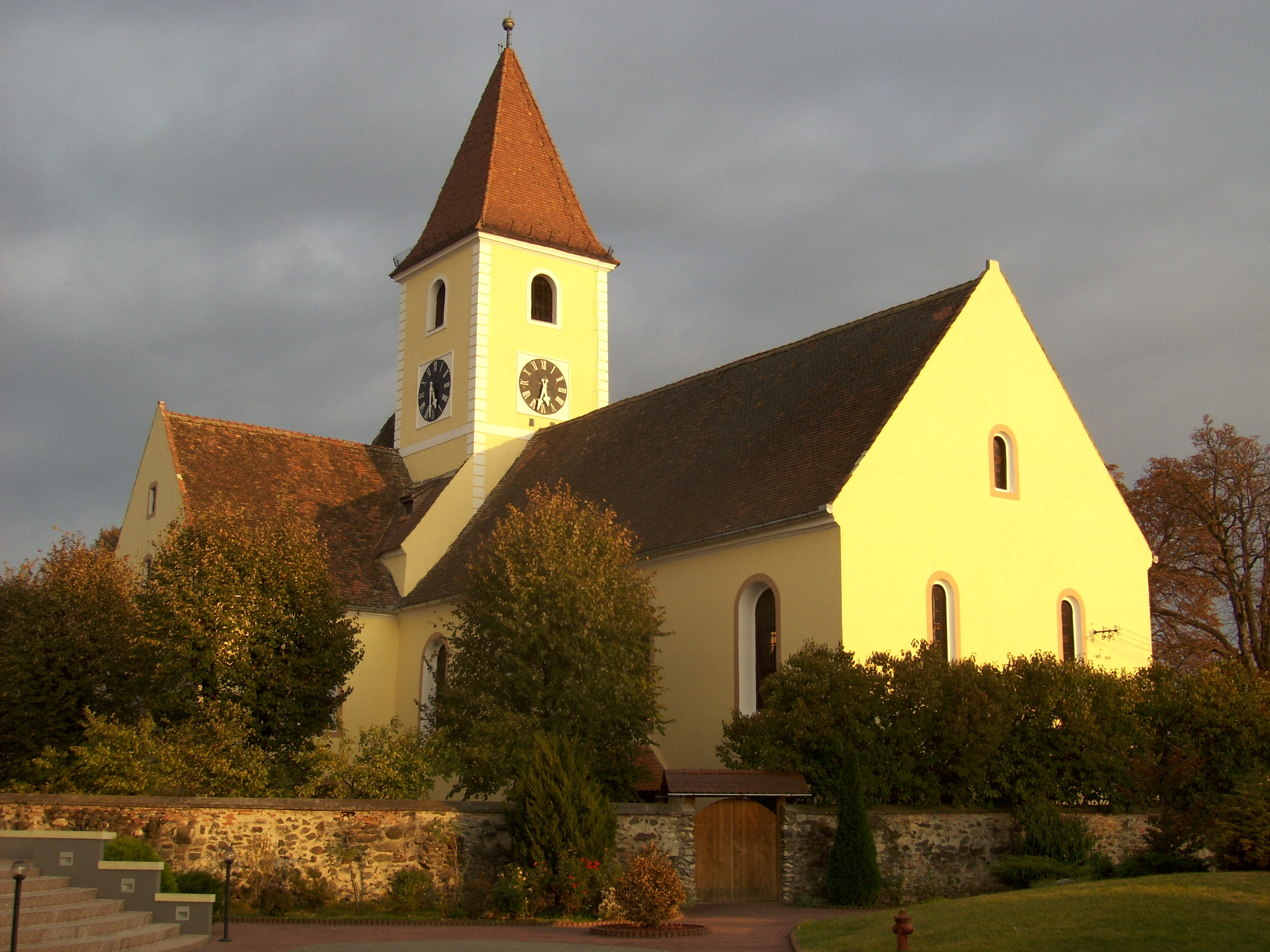
The fortified church

Turnișor (Romanian for 'Little Tower', German: Neppendorf) is a residential district of Sibiu, Romania. It was previously a Saxon village on the outskirts of the city but over the course of several years it was integrated into the city, becoming a district.

Its name comes from the tower of the village church which when looked at from Sibiu, dwarfed the other buildings from the village.

== History ==
The village was established by Saxons and was first attested in the year 1336. It remained a Saxon village until the year 1734 when a Landler community settled in the village.

The fortified church was originally a Romanesque basilica built in the late 12th century, however, it was subsequently altered many times. The current interior is mostly Baroque. The enclosure wall partially survived. After World War II, during the communist regime, Sibiu began a rapid growth, expanding west-ward and incorporating the village into the city.
