= Transylvanian Landlers =

German ethnic group

German: Siebenbürger Landler
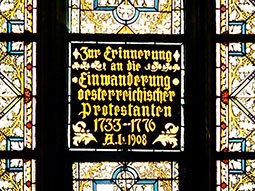
- Detail of a church window in Sibiu/Hermannstadt dedicated to the memory of the Austrian Protestants of Evangelical Lutheran faith.

Regions with significant populations
- Transylvania Counties: Sibiu County (mostly); Alba County (to a very small extent in the past as well)

Languages
- Transylvanian Landler

Religion
- Lutheranism

Related ethnic groups
- Austrians, other Germans of Romania
- A German-speaking community which has been living in Sibiu County and in Sebeș, Alba County, southern Transylvania since the 18th century onwards.

The Landlers or Transylvanian Landlers (German: Siebenbürger Landler or Die siebenbürgischen Landler) are an ethnic German sub-group which has been living on the territory of today's Romania, more specifically in southern Transylvania (mostly corresponding to present-day Sibiu County) since the 18th century onwards.

Their ancestors were Protestants (more specifically Lutherans), who were expelled and settled from Salzkammergut area, Austria to Transylvania near Hermannstadt (present-day Sibiu) from 1734 to 1756 under Emperor Charles VI and Empress Maria Theresa. This was done so given the fact that the Austrian Empire needed to be Roman Catholic by excellence and the Landlers refused to convert to Roman Catholicism. They speak the Transylvanian Landler dialect (German: Landlerisch) which is a southern German dialect. During the 18th century, c. 4,000 Austrian Protestants were expelled to Transylvania. They are part of the Romanian Germans.

== Background ==
The areas from which the ancestors of the modern Transylvanian Landlers stemmed were Upper Austria (German: Oberösterreich), Carinthia (German: Kärnten), and Styria (German: Steiermark). Since Transylvania had been depopulated by the Turkish wars and the plague, the 634 expelled Upper Austrians were given vacant farms to work. Some of the Landlers who were deported from Carinthia in 1755 joined the Hutterites in Transylvania. Transylvania was also a very tolerant country in the past with respect to other religions or confessions as well as a prosperous land in natural resources, hence the Landlers founded the needed impetus and environment to thrive in, just like the Transylvanian Saxons did before them (see Siebenbürgenlied). In total, c. 4,000 Protestant Austrians were expelled and settled in southern Transylvania during the Modern Age.

The Transylvanian Landlers' German dialect is still maintained and is spoken by both those who moved to Germany as well as the few Landlers left behind in their former villages of Neppendorf (Romanian: Turnișor), Großau (Romanian: Cristian), and Großpold (Romanian: Apoldu de Sus). As in the case of other German-speaking ethnic groups in Romania, the Landler are politically represented by the Democratic Forum of Germans in Romania (FDGR/DFDR). A prominent member of the Transylvanian Landler community is Martin Bottesch who formerly served as the president of the County Council of Sibiu County between 2004 and 2012.

== Gallery ==
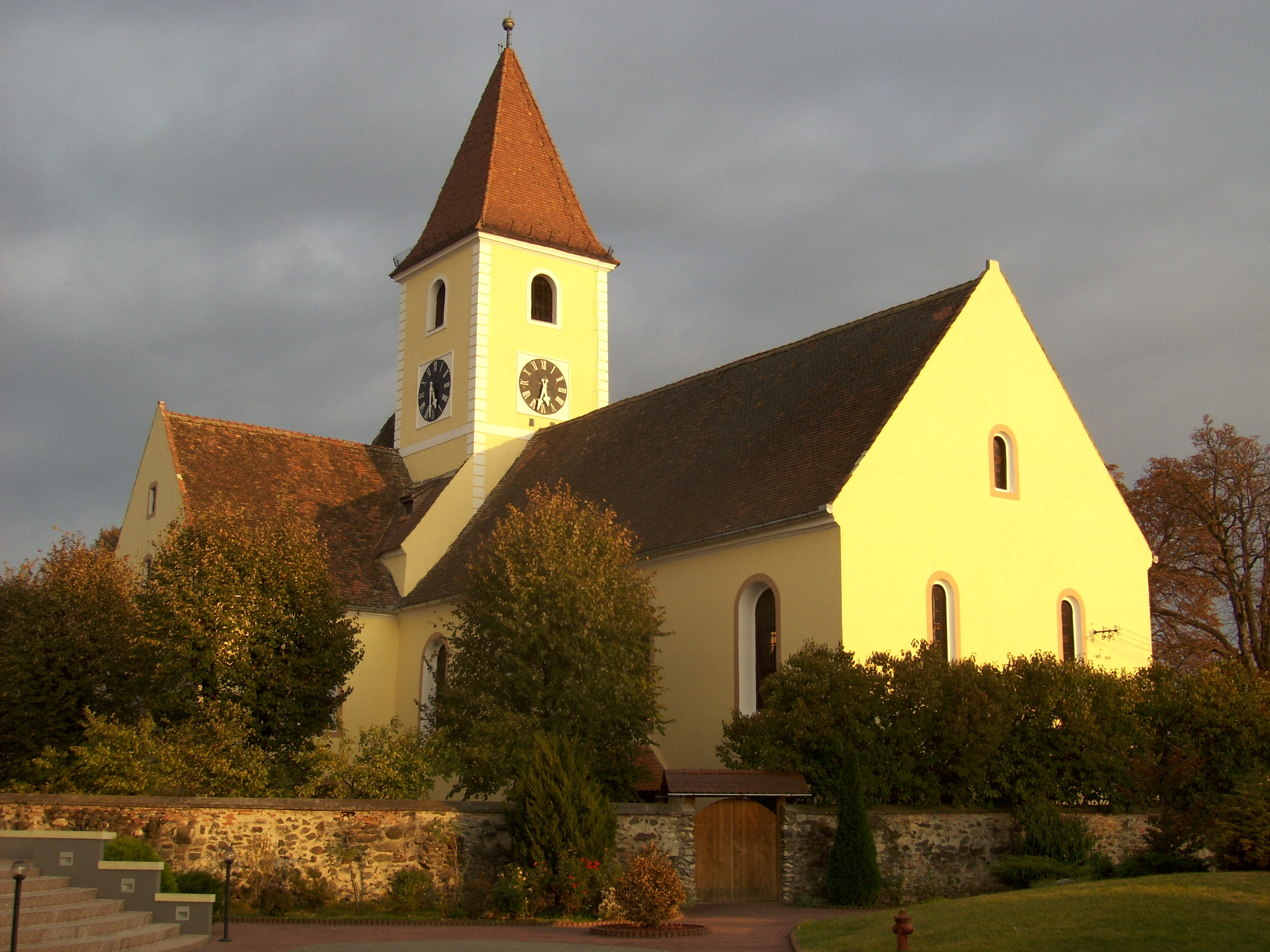
The Evangelical Lutheran fortified church in Turnișor (German: Neppendorf), belonging to the local Transylvanian Landler community

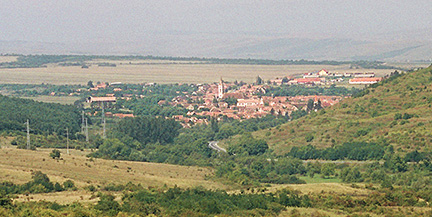
Apoldu de Sus/Großpold

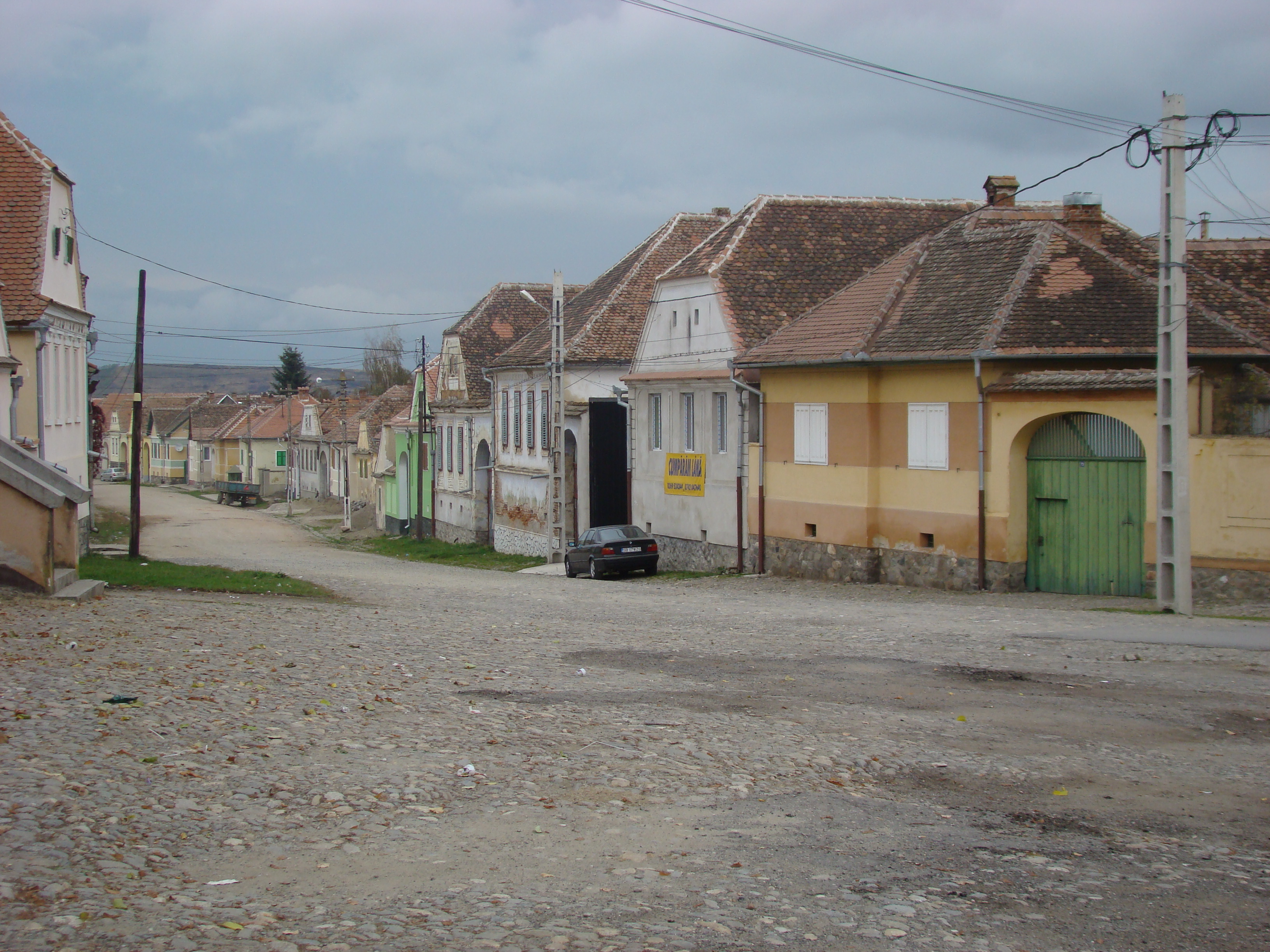
Apoldu de Sus/Großpold

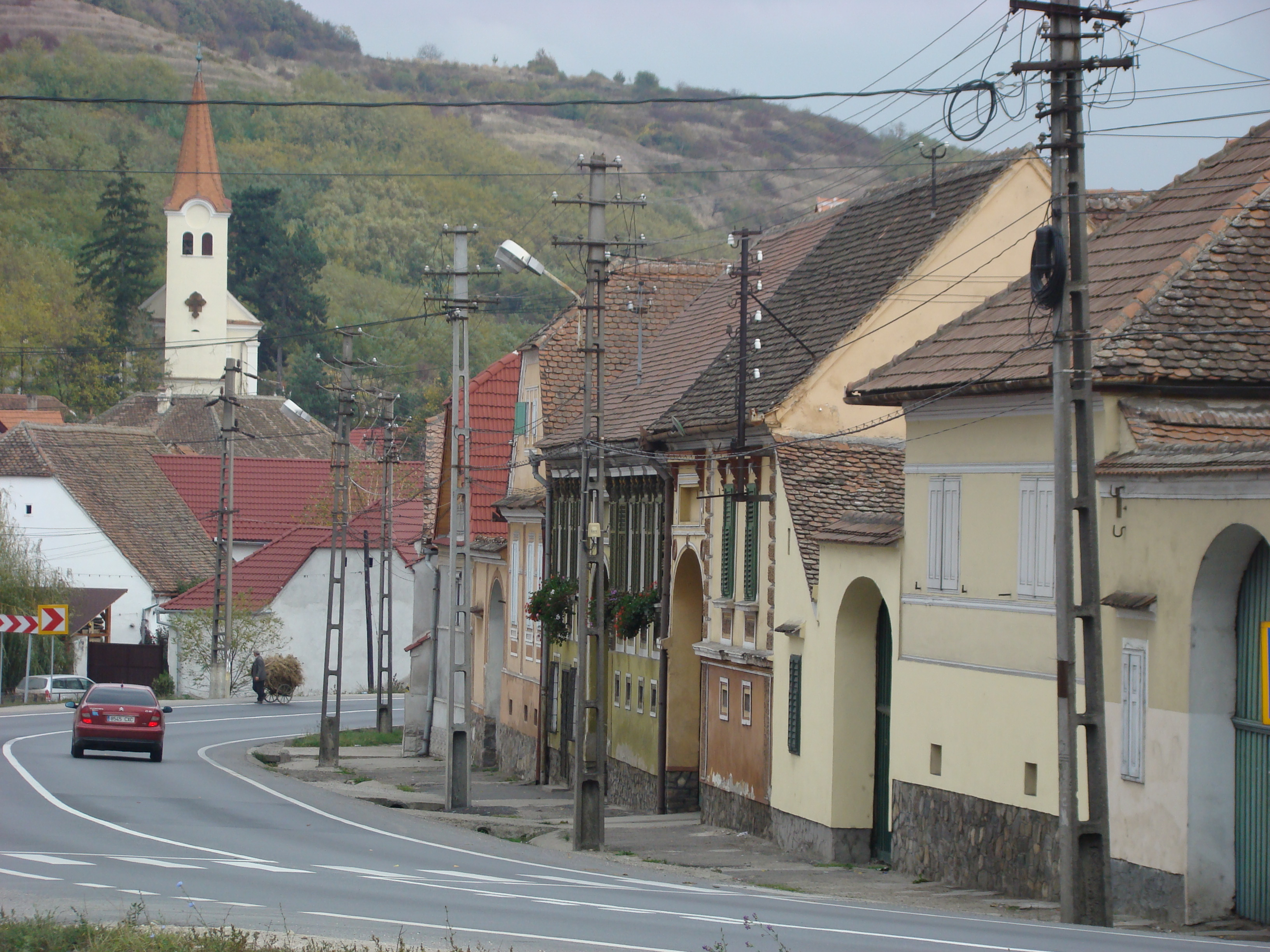
Apoldu de Sus/Großpold

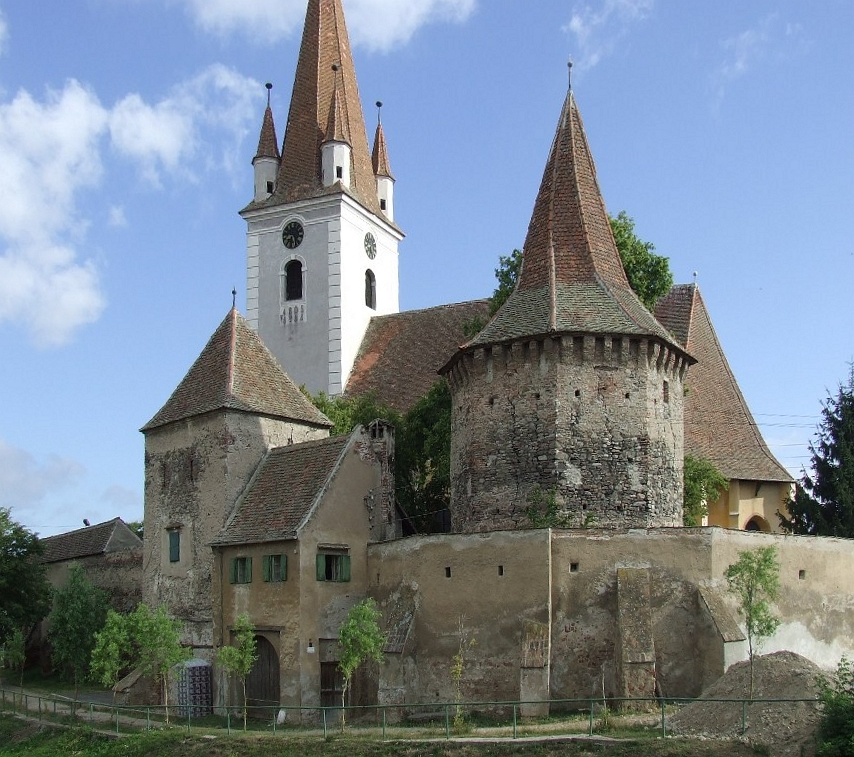
Cristian/Großau

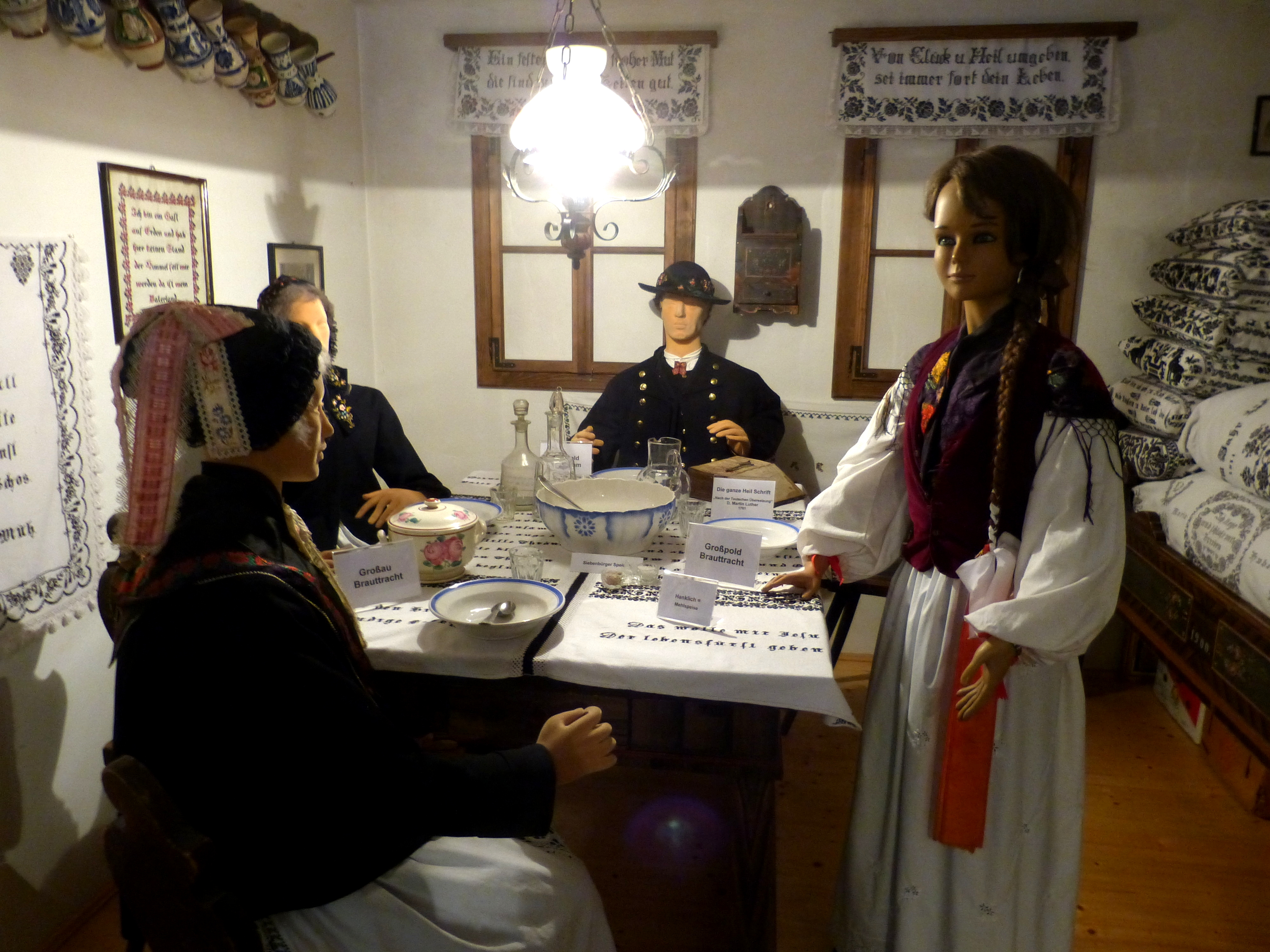
Landler museum in Bad Goisern, Upper Austria with Landler costumes from Großpold/Apoldu de Sus

== See also ==
- Transylvanian Saxons
- Germans of Romania
- Josephine colonization of the 1780s
