= Transylvanian Saxon dialect =

Dialect of the German language spoken by Transylvanian Saxons

Transylvanian Saxon
- Siweberjesch-Såksesch/Såksesch
- Native to: Romania, Germany, Austria, several Western European countries, United States, Canada
- Region: Transylvania (German: Siebenbürgen or Transsilvanien)
- Language family: Indo-European: Germanic; West Germanic; High German; Central German; West Central German; Central Franconian; Moselle Franconian; Transylvanian Saxon

Language codes
- ISO 639-3: –
- Glottolog: tran1294
- Areas where Transylvanian Saxon was spoken in the Kingdom of Romania in 1918 (the grey-coloured areas to the west denote where Swabian was spoken).

- Transylvanian Saxon is classified as Severely Endangered by the UNESCO Atlas of the World's Languages in Danger.

Thomas, a native Transylvanian Saxon speaker from Nösnerland/Nösnergau/Țara Năsăudului (i.e. Bistrița-Năsăud County), recorded in Freiberg am Neckar, Germany, speaking in Transylvanian Saxon about his upbringing, schooling, and profession (i.e. engineering)

Transylvanian Saxon is the native German dialect of the Transylvanian Saxons, an ethnic-German minority group from Transylvania in modern-day central Romania. They are one of the three oldest ethnic-German and German-speaking groups of the German diaspora in Central and Eastern Europe, along with the Baltic Germans and Zipser Germans. They are also the oldest ethnic-German group in the broader community of Germans of Romania.

The dialect is known by the endonym Siweberjesch Såksesch or just Såksesch; in Standard German as Siebenbürgisch-Sächsisch, Siebenbürgisch-sächsischer Dialekt/Mundart, or Die siebenbürgisch-sächsische Sprache (obsolete German spelling: Siebenbürgisch Teutsch); in Transylvanian Landler dialect as Soksisch; in Hungarian as erdélyi szász nyelv; and in Romanian as limba săsească, săsește, or dialectul săsesc.

Transylvanian Saxon was mainly spoken in the south, southeast, and northeast of Transylvania by native speakers of German, Flemish, and Walloon origins who were settled in the Kingdom of Hungary from approximately the 1140s/1150s as part of the Ostsiedlung to the 19th century. Because many of these settlers came from what is now Luxembourg, the dialect is very close to Luxembourgish (especially in vocabulary), especially in contemporary Sibiu County (German: Kreis Hermannstadt). Over its history, the dialect has been influenced by Romanian and Hungarian.

There are two varieties of the dialect: northern Transylvanian Saxon (German: Nordsiebenbürgisch), spoken in Nösnerland (Romanian: Țara Năsăudului), including the dialect of Bistrița; and southern Transylvanian Saxon (German: Südsiebenbürgisch), including, most notably, the dialect of Sibiu (German: Hermannstadt).

In terms of comparative linguistics, Transylvanian Saxon is part of the Moselle Franconian group of West Central German dialects. As noted above, it shares a consistent number of lexical similarities with Luxembourgish. The dialect is also similar to the Zipser German dialect spoken by the Zipsers in Spiš (German: Zips), northeastern Slovakia as well in as Maramureș (Maramureș County) and Bukovina (Suceava County), northeastern Romania.

Nowadays, given its relatively small number of native speakers worldwide, Transylvanian Saxon is severely endangered.

== History and geographic distribution ==
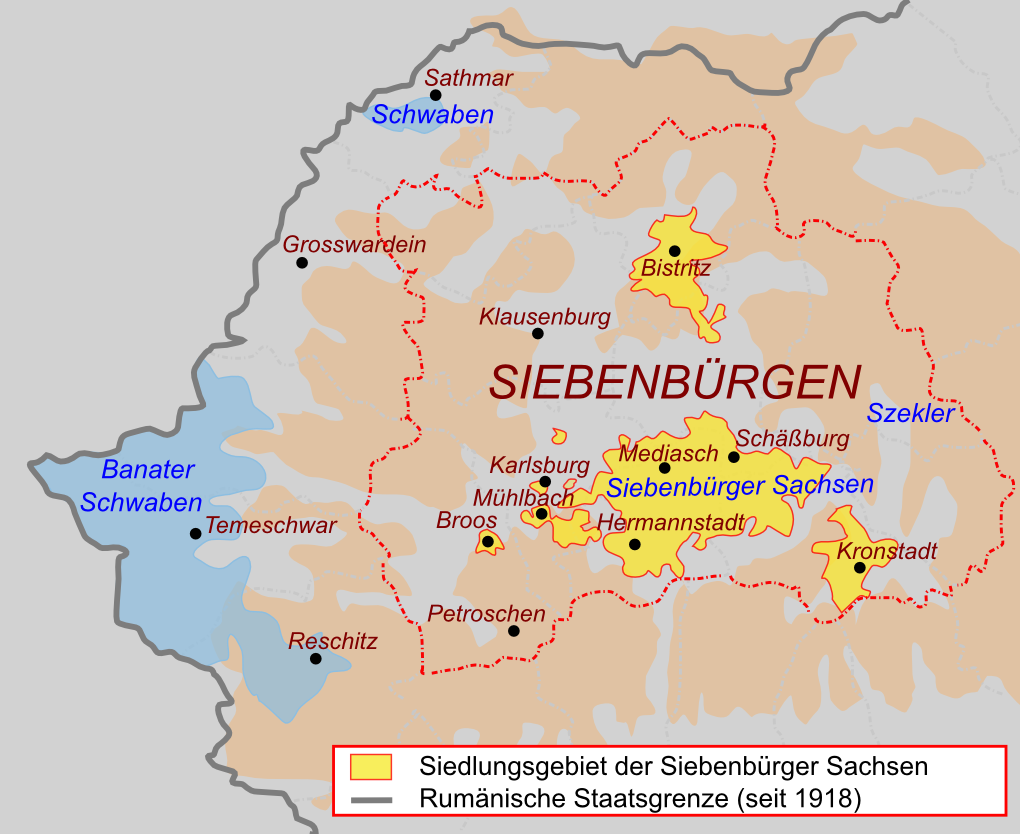
German-language map depicting, in yellow, the areas where Transylvanian Saxons had settled in Transylvania, Romania, during the passing of time, and, consequently, where the Transylvanian Saxon dialect has been traditionally spoken as well

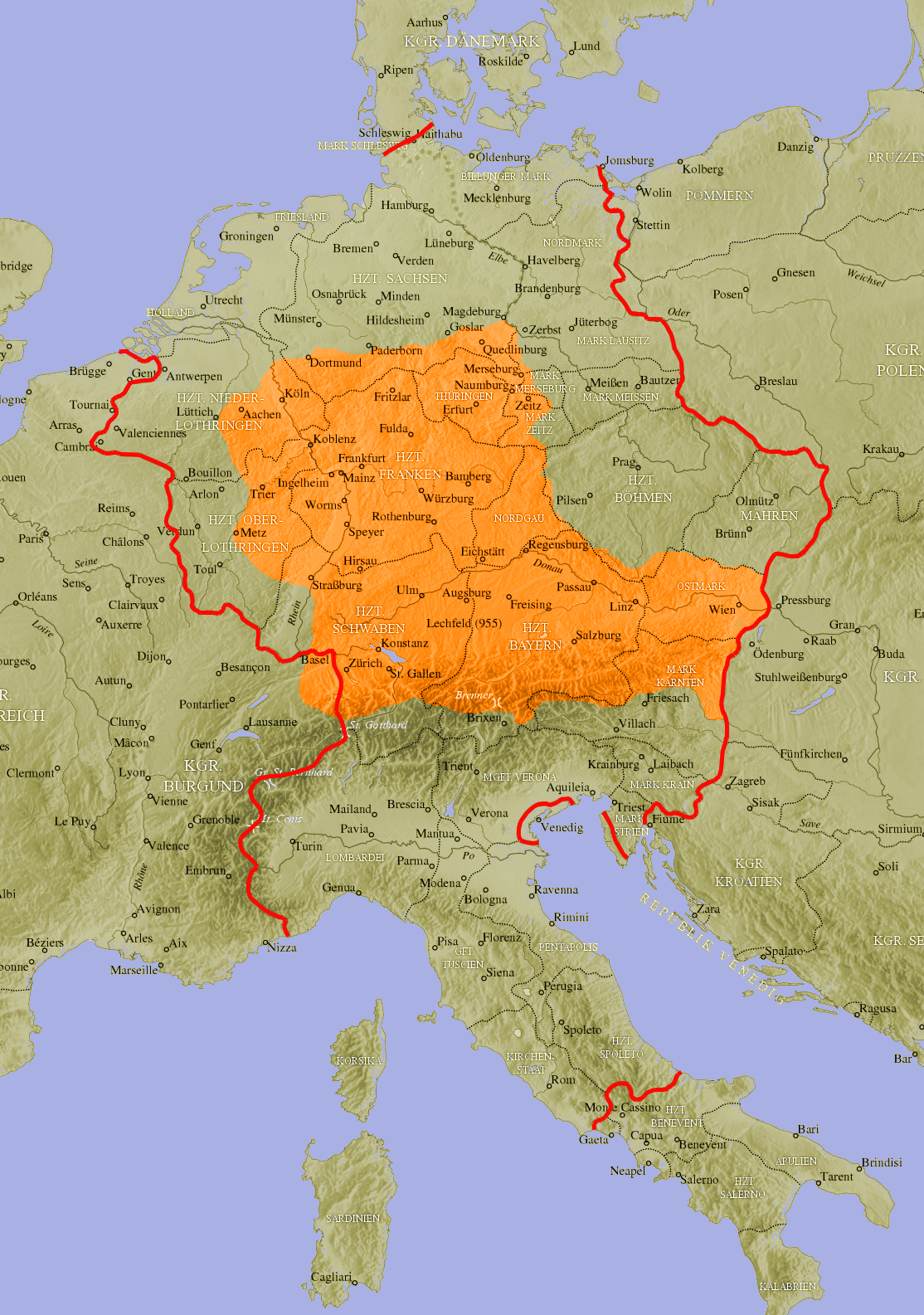
Old High German (German: Althochdeutsch) was spoken in the orange-coloured area on the map (corresponding to the late 10th century) and many German-speaking colonists in Transylvania subsequently stemmed from the areas of Luxembourg, Aachen, and Trier.

From its genesis until the 1990s, Transylvanian Saxon was predominantly spoken in the rural areas of southern and northern Transylvania. These areas correspond mainly to Sibiu County, Brașov County, Mureș County, and Bistrița-Năsăud County and, to a lesser extent, Alba County and Hunedoara County. In towns and cities such as Sibiu/Hermannstadt or Brașov/Kronstadt, standard German (Hochdeutsch) was more commonly spoken and written instead.

The ancestors of the Transylvanian Saxons colonised southern, southeastern, and northeastern Transylvania for purposes of economic development, working as guards at the easternmost borders of what was then the Kingdom of Hungary, as well as miners, especially in the Bistrița (German: Bistritz or Nösen, archaic form) area.

The Transylvanian Saxon dialect varied from village to village, due to the mountainous rural terrain, yet maintaining a certain degree of mutual intelligibility across distance. This is more or less analogous to how English accents vary over a radius of 5 miles (8.0 km) in the United Kingdom.

Over time, the dialect has been consistently influenced by both Romanian and Hungarian due to its speakers' proximity to and interactions with Romanians and Hungarians (mostly Szeklers) in the south, southeast, and northeast of Transylvania. Nonetheless, the conservative character of Transylvanian Saxon compared with other German dialects due to its geographic isolation from them may lead one to understand it as a form of Old High German or Middle High German.

== Modern era and diaspora ==
Before the Romanian Revolution of 1989, most Transylvanian Saxons were still living in Transylvania. By 1990, this population had decreased dramatically. Shortly after the fall of Communism, from 1991 to 1994, many Transylvanian Saxons who still remained in Transylvania decided to emigrate to reunified Germany, leaving a minority of approximately 20,000 Romania at the end of the 21st century (less than 1% of the entire population of Transylvania).

The vast majority of native speakers have emigrated in several waves. Most have settled in Germany and Austria, while others have moved to the US, Canada, and other Western European countries, managing to preserve (at least temporarily) their dialect at their ultimate destinations.

According to the 2011 Romanian census, only 11,400 Transylvanian Saxons still lived in Transylvania at that time. The 2021 Romanian census (postponed one year to 2022 due to the COVID-19 pandemic in Romania) reported a smaller overall figure for the German minority in Romania, implying that even fewer native Transylvanian Saxon speakers remained in Transylvania. The number of native Transylvanian Saxon speakers today is estimated at approximately 200,000.

Transylvanian Saxon is the native dialect of the former President of Romania, Klaus Iohannis, who is a Transylvanian Saxon. It is also the native dialect of well-known German rock musician Peter Maffay.

== Sample text ==
Below is a sample text written in the Transylvanian Saxon dialect: an old traditional ballad titled "De Råch" ("The Revenge"), also translated into standard German and English for comparison:

De Råch
(Transylvanian Saxon in original)

Hië ritt berjuëf, hië ritt berjåff,
bäs e se un em Brånnen tråf.

Geaden Dåch, geaden Dåch, ir läf Härrn,
nea wäll ich met ech riëde gärn!

Wat huët ech menj Fra uch Känjd gedon,
dåt ir mer se huët nedergeschlon?

Wat huët ech dä jang Easchuld gedon,
dåt sä nea stiindiut äm Iëren lån?

Den enen stauch hië vum Ruëß eruëf
diëm åndren schleach e det Hiift em uëf.

Dien drätten spålt e wä en Fäsch,
der viert lef än den gränen Bäsch.

Net ener wul do bläiwe stohn,
net ener wul an Åntwert son.

Hië ritt dohänne mät fräschem Meat,
esi bezuëlt em de Fånden geat.

Die Rache

(Standard German) (Note: Originally translated from Transylvanian Saxon to standard German by German Wikipedia user DietG.)

Er ritt bergab, er ritt bergauf,
bis er sie an einem Brunnen traf.

Guten Tag, guten Tag, ihr lieben Herrn,
nun will ich mit euch reden gern!

Was hat euch mein' Frau und Kind getan
dass ihr sie mir habt niedergeschlag’n?

Was hat euch die junge Unschuld getan,
dass sie nun steintod am Boden lahn?

Den einen stach er vom Ross herab,
dem andern schlug er das Haupte ab.

Den dritten spaltete er wie einen Fisch,
der vierte lief in den grünen Busch. (Note: Bäsch should mean forest or Wald in standard German, but, so as for the rhyme to still remain, Busch or bush was written here instead.)

Kein einz’ger wollt’ dort bleiben stehn,
Kein einz'ger wollte Antwort geb’n.

Er ritt dahin mit frischem Mut,
so bezahlt man seine Feinde gut.

The Revenge

(English translation)

He rode downhill, he rode uphill,
until he met them at a well.

Good day, good day, dear sir,
now I would like to talk to you!

What did my woman and child do to you
that you knocked them down because of me?

What has young innocence done to you
that they are now stone dead on the ground?

One he stabbed down from his horse,
he cut off the head of the other.

The third one he split like a fish,
the fourth one ran into the green bush.

Not a single one wanted to stay there,
Not a single one wanted to answer.

He rode with fresh courage
that's how you pay your enemies well.

Below is another sample text of religious nature, more specifically the Our Father prayer:

Foater auser
(Transylvanian Saxon in original)

Foater auser dier dau best em Hemmel,
geheleget verde deing numen,
zaukomm aus deing rech,
deing vell geschey aff ierden
als vey em hemmel,
auser däglich briut gaff aus heigd,
ond fergaff aus auser schuld,
vey mir fergien auser en schuldigeren.
Feir aus nèt en fersechung,
saunderen erlüs aus von dem üvvell.
Denn deing ess dat rech, dei krafft,
ond dei herrleget, von ieveget, zau ieveget,
Amen.

== Bibliography ==
- Siebenbürgisch-Sächsisches Wörterbuch. A. Schullerus, B. Capesius, A. Tudt, S. Haldenwang et al. (in German)
  - Band 1, Buchstabe A – C, 1925, de Gruyter, ASIN: B0000BUORT
  - Band 2, Buchstabe D – F, 1926, de Gruyter, ASIN: B0000BUORU
  - Band 3, Buchstabe G, 1971, de Gruyter, ASIN: B0000BUORV
  - Band 4, Buchstabe H – J, 1972
  - Band 5, Buchstabe K, 1975
  - Band 6, Buchstabe L, 1997, Böhlau Verlag, ISBN 978-3-412-03286-9
  - Band 7: Buchstabe M, 1998, Böhlau Verlag, ISBN 978-3-412-09098-2
  - Band 8, Buchstabe N – P, 2002, Böhlau Verlag, ISBN 978-3-412-12801-2
  - Band 9: Buchstabe Q – R, 2007, Böhlau Verlag, ISBN 978-3-412-06906-3
  - Band 10: Buchstabe S – Sche, 2014, Böhlau Verlag, ISBN 978-3-412-22410-3
  - Band 11: Schentzel – Schnapp-, 2020, Böhlau Verlag, ISBN 978-3412519810
