= Budacu de Jos =

- Commune
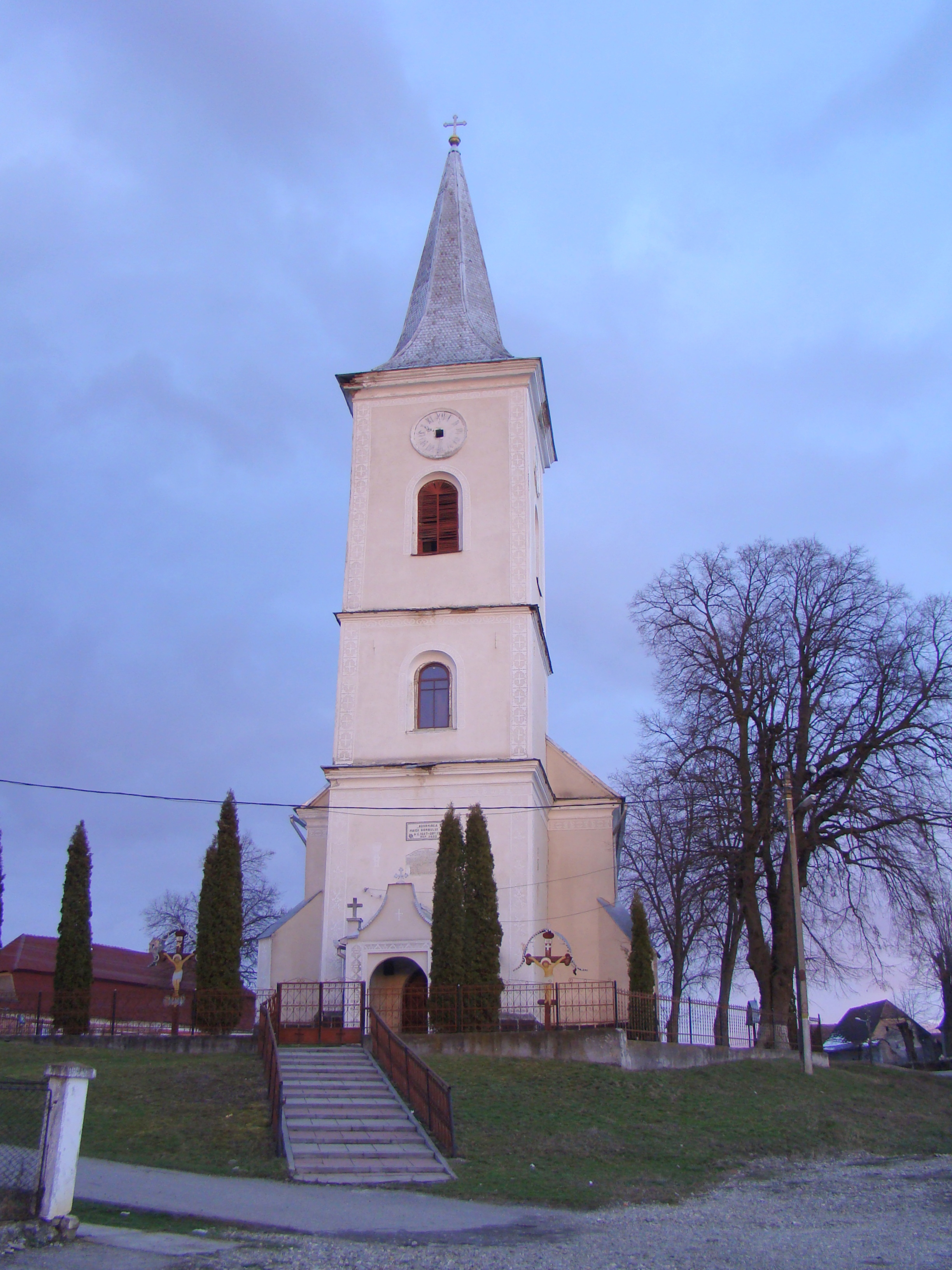
- Church of the Dormition in Budacu de Jos

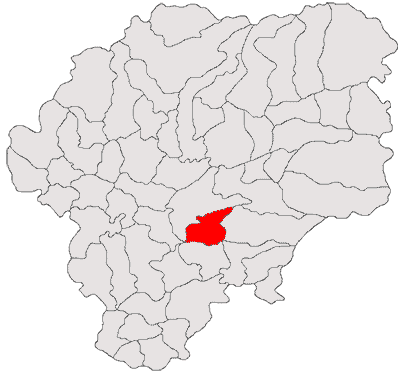
- Location in Bistrița-Năsăud County

- Location in Romania
- Coordinates: 47°5′N 24°31′E
- Country: Romania
- County: Bistrița-Năsăud

Government
  - Mayor (2020–2024): Florin-Sandu Simionca (PSD)
- Area: 60.58 km^{2} (23.39 sq mi)
- Elevation: 358 m (1,175 ft)
- Population (2021-12-01): 3,289
  - Density: 54.29/km^{2} (140.6/sq mi)
- Time zone: UTC+02:00 (EET)
  - Summer (DST): UTC+03:00 (EEST)
- Postal code: 427015
- Area code: +40 x59
- Vehicle reg.: BN
- Website: www.budacudejos.ro

Budacu de Jos (formerly Budacu Săsesc; German: Deutsch-Budak; Hungarian: Szászbudak or Szász Budac; Transylvanian Saxon: Budek or Buddek) is a commune in Bistrița-Năsăud County, Transylvania, Romania.

It is composed of five villages: Budacu de Jos, Buduș (formerly Budacul Mic; Kisbudac; Alsóbudak; Budesdorf or Klein-Budak), Jelna (formerly Jălna; Kiszsolna or Zsolna; Senndorf or Sellendorf), Monariu (formerly Monora; Malomárka; Minarken), and Simionești (formerly Șimontelche; Simontelke; Seimersdorf).

== Geography ==
The commune is situated on the Transylvanian Plateau, at the foot of the Călimani Mountains. The river Budac (a tributary of the Șieu) flows through the commune.

Located in the Nösnerland historic region of Transylvania, Budacu de Jos lies in the south-central part of Bistrița-Năsăud County, 6 km (3.7 mi) south of the county seat, Bistrița. County road DJ172G connects the component villages of the commune, while road DJ173C leads to the city of Bistrița.

== Demographics ==
Historical population
Year	Pop.	±%
2002	2,888	—
2011	2,772	−4.0%
2021	3,289	+18.7%
Source: Census data

At the 2011 census, Budacu de Jos had 2,772 inhabitants, of which 78.97% were Romanians and 17.93% Roma. At the 2021 census the population had increased to 3,289, of which 78.63% were Romanians and 15.66% Roma.

== Sights ==
- Wooden church of Budacu de Jos
- Lutheran church of Budacu de Jos
- Lutheran church of Jelna
- Lutheran church of Monariu

== Notable people ==
- Iulian Pop (1880 – 1923), lawyer and politician, first Romanian Mayor of Cluj
