= Cetate, Bistrița-Năsăud =

Cetate
- Commune
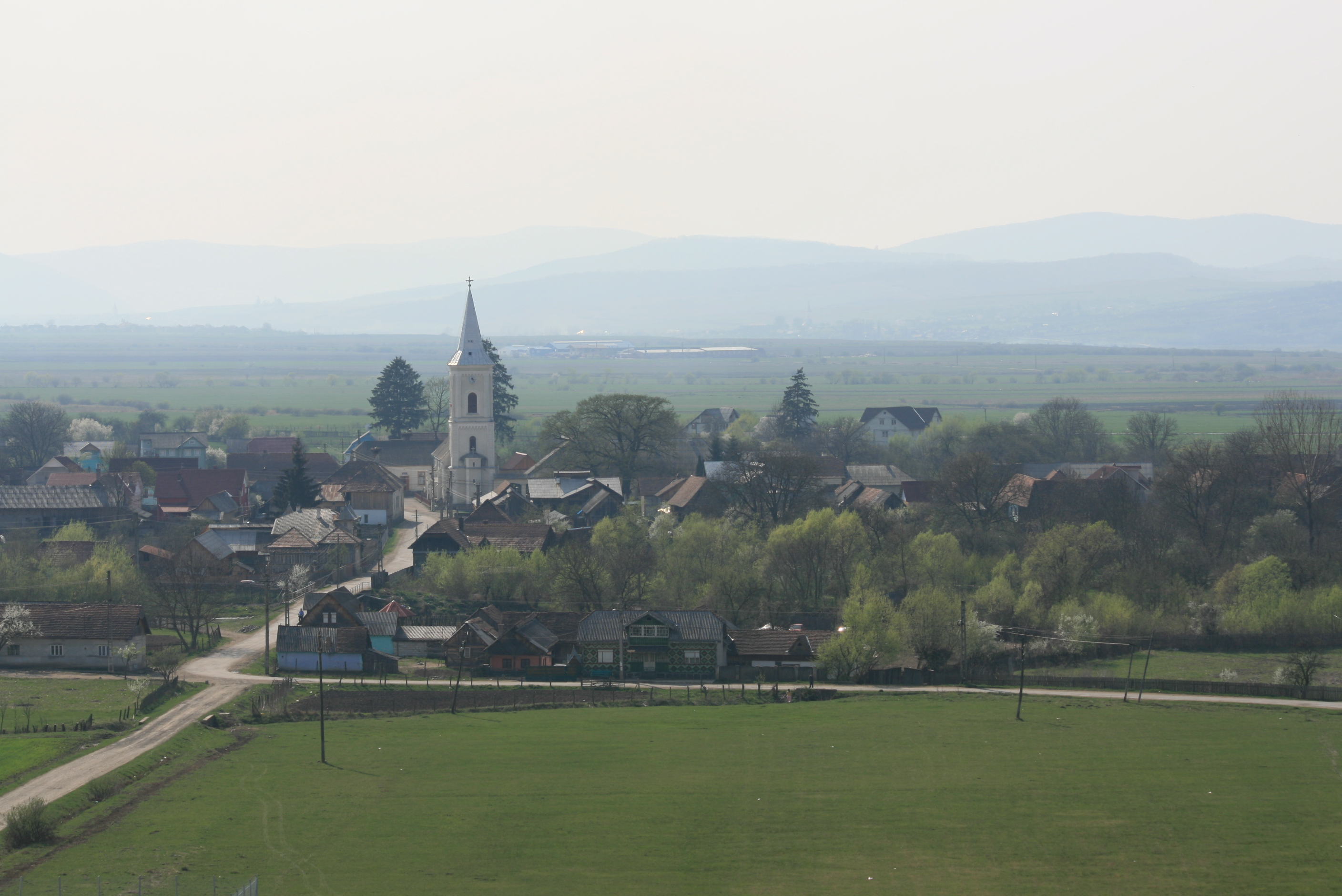
- Orheiu Bistriței

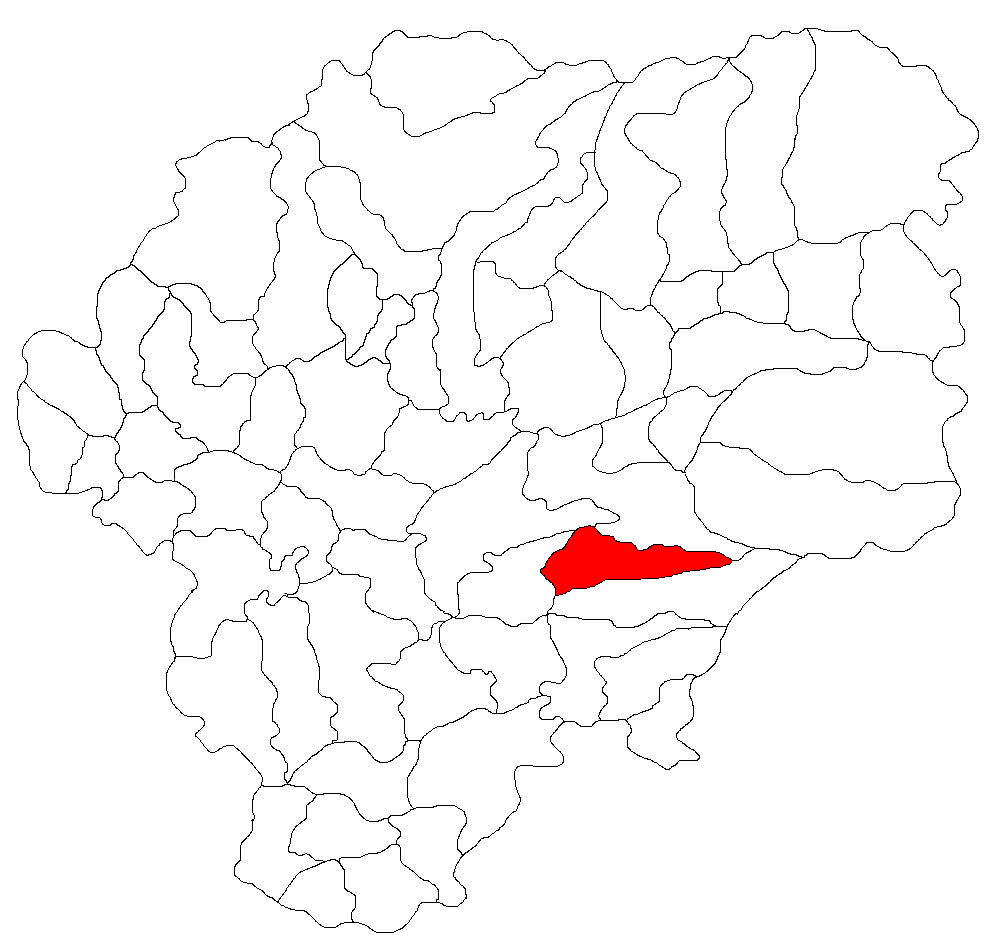
- Location in Bistrița-Năsăud County

- Location in Romania
- Coordinates: 47.1097°N 24.6261°E
- Country: Romania
- County: Bistrița-Năsăud

Government
  - Mayor (2020–2024): Dumitru-Lucian Tarniță (PMP)
- Area: 66.63 km^{2} (25.73 sq mi)
- Elevation: 423 m (1,388 ft)
- Population (2021-12-01): 2,617
  - Density: 39.28/km^{2} (101.7/sq mi)
- Time zone: UTC+02:00 (EET)
  - Summer (DST): UTC+03:00 (EEST)
- Postal code: 427035
- Area code: +40 x59
- Vehicle reg.: BN
- Website: www.primaria-cetate.ro

Cetate is a commune in Bistrița-Năsăud County, Transylvania, Romania. It is composed of three villages: Orheiu Bistriței (Hungarian: Óvárhely or Várhely or Wárhely; German: Burghalle), Petriș (Hungarian: Petres; German: Petersdorf), and the commune center, Satu Nou (Hungarian: Felsőszászújfalu; German: Oberneudorf). It also included three other villages until 2002, when they were split off to form Dumitrița Commune.

The commune is located in the central part of the county, 13 km (8 mi) east of the county seat, Bistrița. It lies in the historic region of Nösnerland, a region centered between the Bistrița and Mureș rivers.

Cetate is situated in a hilly area at the eastern edge of the Transylvanian Plateau. To the east of Satu Nou village are the Călimani Mountains, with Vulturul Peak dominating the area at 1,501 m (4,925 ft).

The route of the Via Transilvanica long-distance trail passes through the villages of Cetate, Petriș and Orheiu Bistriței.

== See also ==
- Castra of Orheiu Bistriței
- Dacian fortress of Monariu
