= Dumitrița =

- Commune
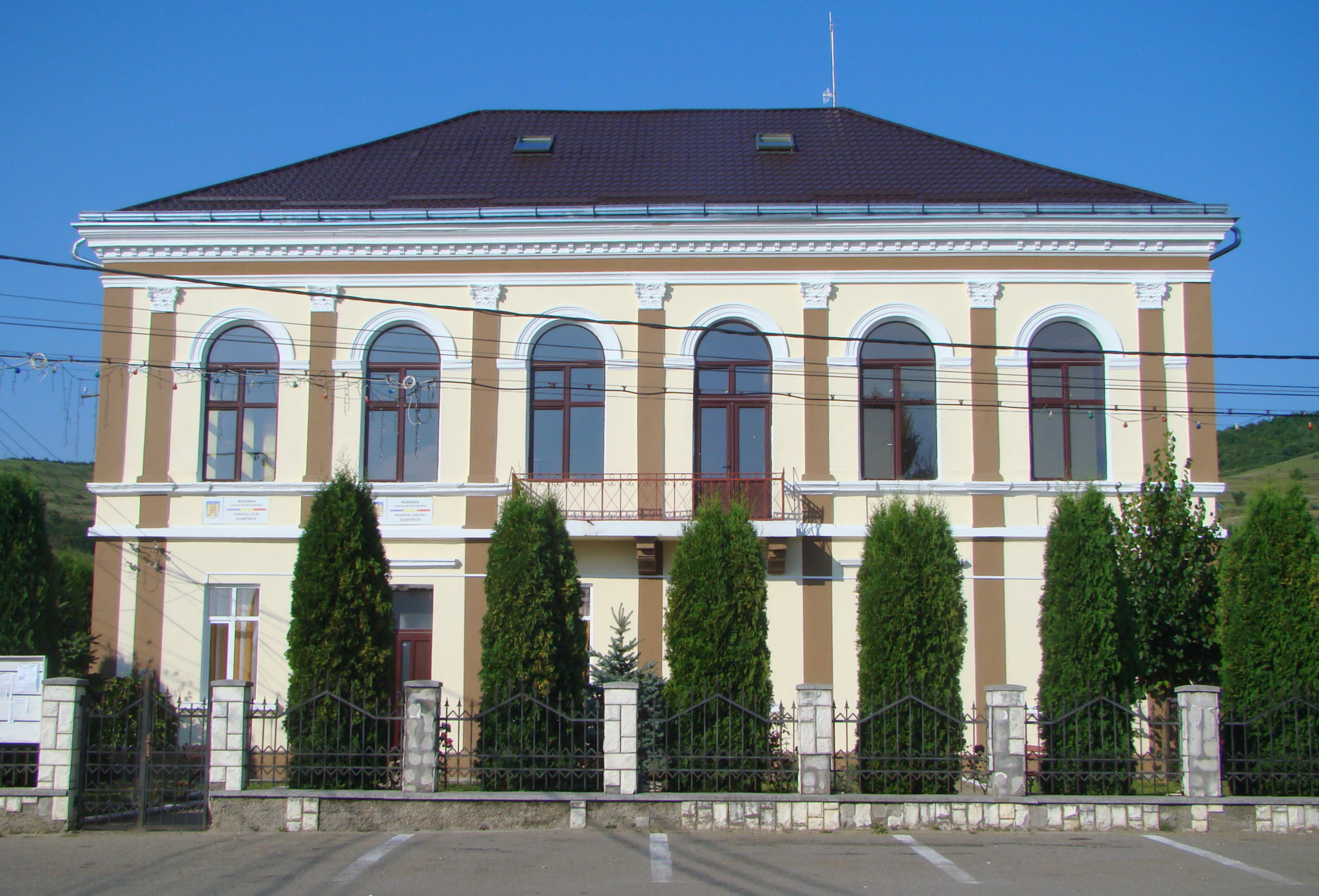
- Dumitrița town hall

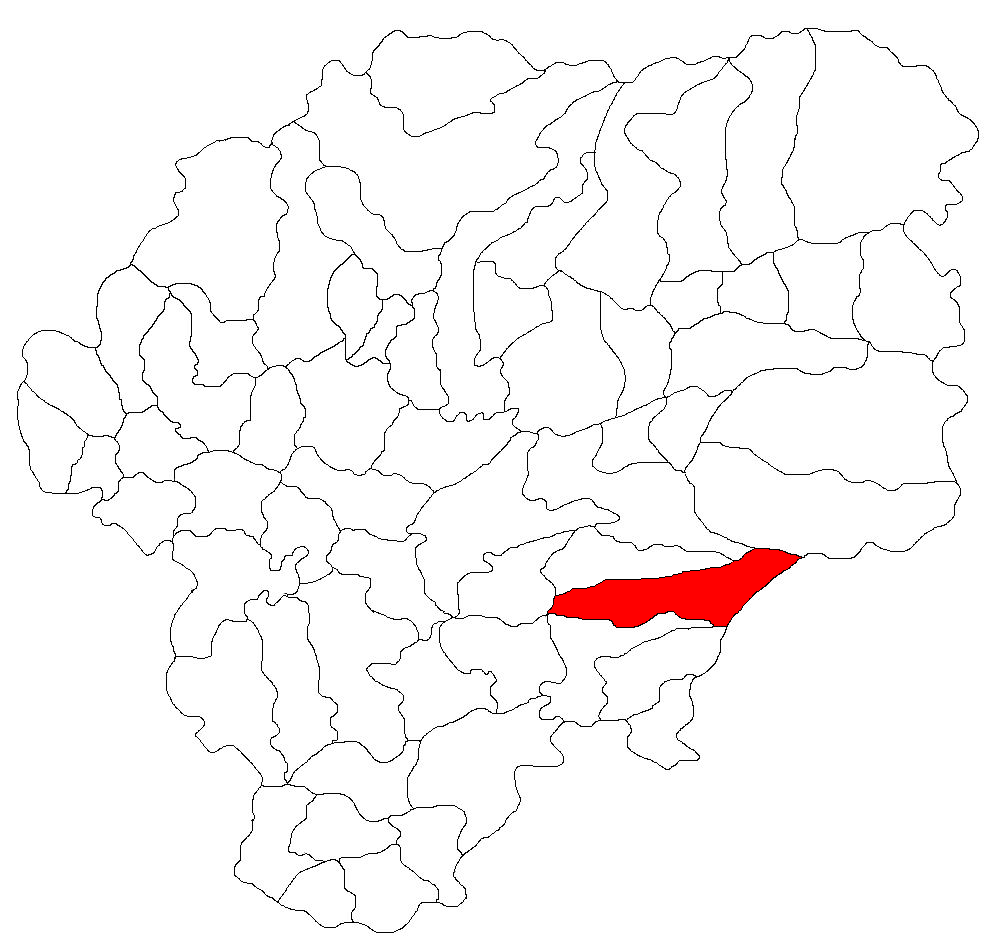
- Location in Bistrița-Năsăud County

- Location in Romania
- Coordinates: 47°4′N 24°37′E
- Country: Romania
- County: Bistrița-Năsăud

Government
  - Mayor (2020–2024): Ilie-Vasile Uchrenciuc (PSD)
- Area: 102.96 km^{2} (39.75 sq mi)
- Elevation: 464 m (1,522 ft)
- Population (2021-12-01): 3,145
  - Density: 30.55/km^{2} (79.11/sq mi)
- Time zone: UTC+02:00 (EET)
  - Summer (DST): UTC+03:00 (EEST)
- Postal code: 427037
- Area code: (+40) 02 63
- Vehicle reg.: BN
- Website: www.dumitrita.ro

Dumitrița (German: Waltersdorf; Hungarian: Kisdemeter) is a commune in Bistrița-Năsăud County, Transylvania, Romania. It is composed of three villages: Budacu de Sus (German: Rumänisch-Budak or Klein-Budak or Budesdorf; Hungarian: Felsőbudak), Dumitrița, and Ragla (Ragelsdorf, Rágla). These were part of Cetate Commune until 2002, when they were split off.

The commune is located in the eastern part of the county, 15 km (9 mi) from the county seat, Bistrița, on the border with Mureș County. It lies in the historic region of Nösnerland, a region centered between the Bistrița and Mureș rivers.

At the 2021 census, the commune had a population of 3,145; of those, 86.49% were Romanians and 6.33% Roma.
