= Șieu =

Șieu may refer to several places:

- Șieu, Bistrița-Năsăud, a commune in Bistrița-Năsăud County
- Șieu, Maramureș, a commune in Maramureș County
- Șieu-Măgheruș, a commune in Bistrița-Năsăud County
- Șieu-Odorhei, a commune in Bistrița-Năsăud County and its village of Cristur-Șieu
- Șieu-Sfântu, a village in Șintereag Commune, Bistrița-Năsăud County
- Șieu (river), in Bistrița-Năsăud County, Romania
