= János Móga =

Austrian and Hungarian general (1784–1861)

General János Móga de Brotzka
- brotzkai Móga János Ferenc
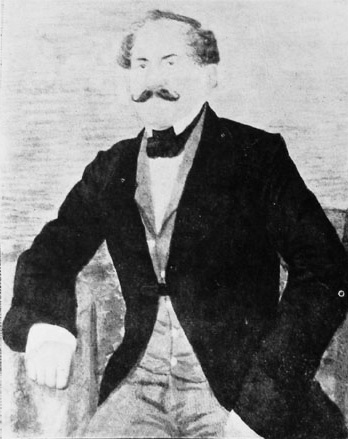
- Portrait of János Móga

Supreme Commander of the Hungarian Revolutionary Army
- In office 22 September 1848 – 1 November 1848
- Preceded by: Archduke Stephen Francis
- Succeeded by: Artúr Görgei

Personal details
- Born: 25 December 1784 Brockó, Kingdom of Hungary, Habsburg monarchy (now Brodské, Slovakia)
- Died: 10 November 1861 (aged 76) Archiud, Grand Principality of Transylvania, Austrian Empire
- Spouse: Erzsébet Farkas
- Children: Eleonóra Erzsébet Terézia

Military service
- Allegiance: Austrian Empire; Kingdom of Hungary
- Branch/service: Imperial Austrian Army; Hungarian Revolutionary Army
- Years of service: 1800s–1848
- Rank: Feldmarschall-Leutnant
- Commands: Hungarian Revolutionary Army
- Battles/wars: Napoleonic Wars; Battle of Wagram; Hungarian Revolution of 1848; Battle of Pákozd; Battle of Schwechat

János Móga (Hungarian: brotzkai Móga János Ferenc, Romanian: Ioan Francisc Moga; 25 December 1784 – 10 November 1861) was an imperial Austrian Feldmarschall-Leutnant (lieutenant field marshal) of Romanian origin and the first Supreme Commander of the Hungarian Revolutionary Army during the opening phase of the Hungarian Revolution of 1848.

== Origins and family ==
Móga was born into a Roman Catholic noble family of Romanian origin in Brockó (present-day Brodské, Trnava Region, Slovakia), the son of János Móga de Brotzka and Rozália Radl.

From his marriage to Erzsébet Farkas, Móga had one daughter:

- Eleonóra Erzsébet Terézia Móga (12 January 1812, Pozsony – 20 March 1892), who married Count György Lázár de Szárhegy (1807–1861), a general in the Hungarian Honvéd army who later returned to the imperial Austrian forces on 1 January 1849.

== Military career ==
=== Napoleonic Wars ===
Móga entered the imperial Austrian army and fought as a first lieutenant (Oberleutnant) during the Napoleonic Wars. On 6 July 1809, he was severely wounded at the Battle of Wagram, which led to his placement in the reserve in 1810.

He returned to active service in 1813 with the rank of captain. Over the following decades, he rose through the military hierarchy, receiving promotion to major general in August 1842 and to Feldmarschall-Leutnant in June 1848.

=== Hungarian Revolution of 1848–1849 ===
In the autumn of 1848, following the resignation of the Palatine of Hungary, Archduke Stephen, Prime Minister Lajos Batthyány entrusted Móga with the supreme command of the Hungarian troops mobilized against the forces of the Ban of Croatia, Josip Jelačić.

On 29 September 1848, at the Battle of Pákozd, Móga halted the advance of Jelačić's troops toward Buda and Pest. Although he pursued the Croatian army to the Austrian border, he initially refused to cross the frontier to march on Vienna, considering that his military oath to the emperor prevented him from taking that step.

At the urging of Lajos Kossuth, Móga eventually crossed the border with the Hungarian army on 30 October 1848. That same day, the Battle of Schwechat took place, in which the Hungarian troops were defeated by the combined imperial forces commanded by Field Marshal Alfred I, Prince of Windisch-Grätz and Ban Jelačić. Following the defeat, Móga resigned as supreme commander on 1 November 1848 and retired from active military service.

== Conviction and later years ==
After imperial Austrian forces occupied Buda and Pest on 5 January 1849, Móga was arrested. He was tried by a military tribunal in Olomouc (Olmütz) and sentenced to five years of imprisonment in a fortress, stripped of his military rank, and deprived of all orders and decorations.

After serving his sentence, he lived in retirement on the estate of his son-in-law, Count György Lázár, at Archiud (Szászerked) in Kolozs County. He died there on 10 November 1861.
