= Archiud =

- Location within Romania

Location
- Country: Romania
- Counties: Bistrița-Năsăud County
- Villages: Archiud

Physical characteristics
- Mouth: Dipșa
  - location: Dipșa
  - coordinates: 46.9597°N 24.4366°E
- Length: 13 km (8.1 mi)
- Basin size: 40 km^{2} (15 sq mi)

Basin features
- Progression: Dipșa→ Șieu→ Someșul Mare→ Someș→ Tisza→ Danube→ Black Sea

The Archiud is a left tributary of the river Dipșa in Romania. It flows through the Budurleni Reservoir, and discharges into the Dipșa in the village Dipșa. Its length is 13 km (8.1 mi) and its basin size is 40 km^{2} (15 sq mi).
