= Bretea =

Bretea may refer to:

- Bretea, a village in the Șieu-Odorhei commune in Bistriţa-Năsăud County, Romania
- Bretea River, a tributary of the Şieu River in Romania
- Bretea Română, a commune in Hunedoara County, Romania
- Bretea Streiului, a village in the Bretea Română commune, Romania
- Bretea Mureșană, a village in the Ilia, Hunedoara commune, Romania
