= Lechința (disambiguation) =

Lechința may refer to the following places in Romania:

- Lechința, a commune in Bistrița-Năsăud County
- Lechința, a village in the commune Iernut, Mureș County
- Lechința, a village in the commune Călinești-Oaș, Satu Mare County
- Lechința (Dipșa), a river in Bistrița-Năsăud County
- Lechința (Mureș), a river in Bistrița-Năsăud and Mureș Counties
