= Sângeorgiu =

Sângeorgiu (Romanian for "St. George") may refer to:

- Sângeorgiu de Pădure
- Sângeorgiu de Mureș
- Sângeorgiu de Câmpie
- Sângeorgiu de Meseș

== See also ==
- Sângeorzu Nou
- Sângeorzu River
- Sângeorge
- Giurgiu
- Sfântu Gheorghe (disambiguation)
