= Pintic =

Pintic may refer to several places in Romania:

- Pintic, a village in the town of Dej, Cluj County
- Pintic, a village in Tulgheș Commune, Harghita County
- Pinticu, a village in Teaca Commune, Bistrița-Năsăud County
- Slătiniţa, formerly Pintic, a village in Bistrița city, Bistrița-Năsăud County
- Pintic (river), a river in Bistrița-Năsăud County, tributary of the Dipșa
- Pintic, a river in Harghita and Neamț Counties, tributary of the Bistricioara
