= Fontana Tenement =

Fontanowska Tenement
- Kamienica Fontanowska
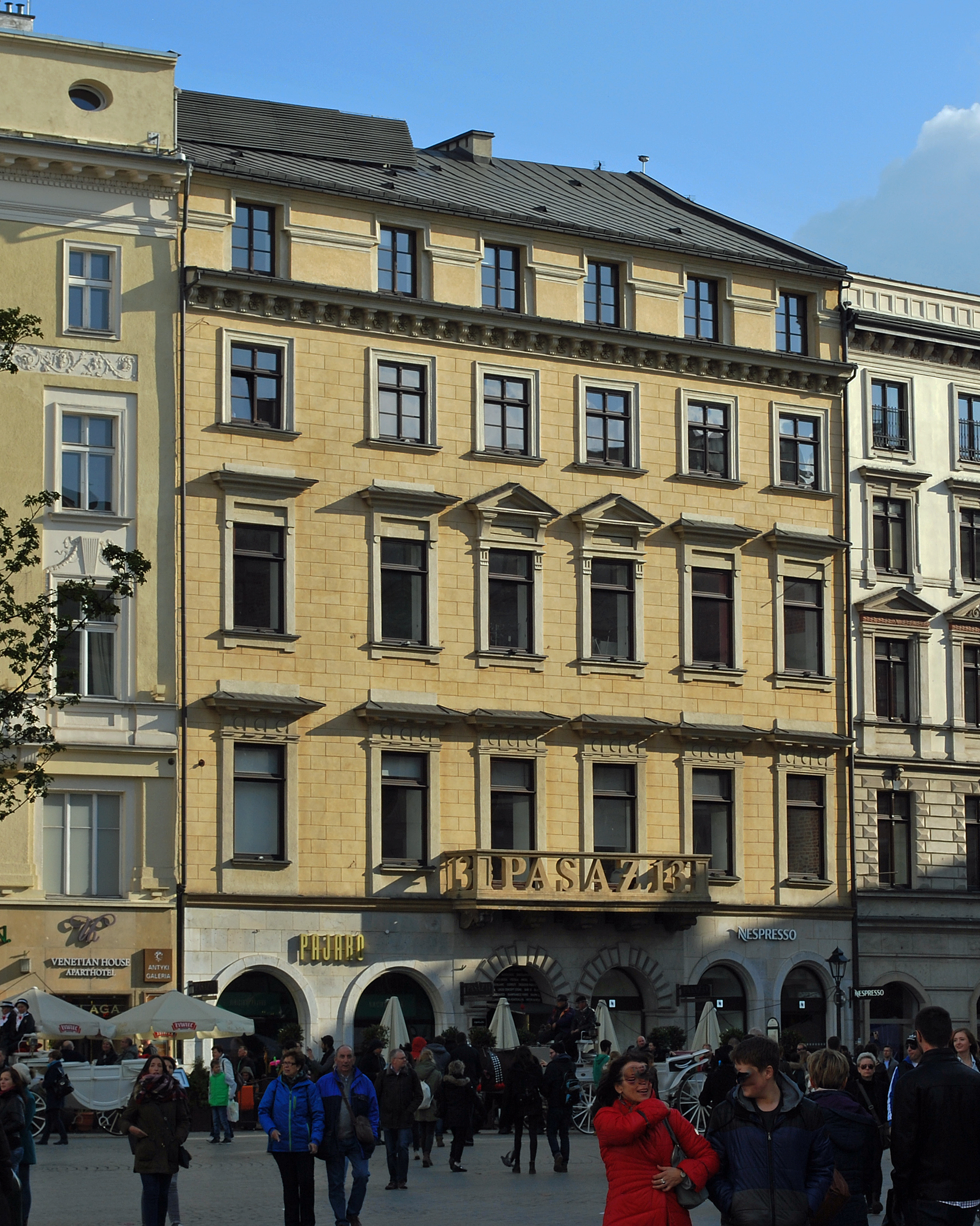
- Interactive map of the Fontanowska Tenement area

General information
- Location: 12 Main Market Square, Kraków, Poland
- Coordinates: 50°03′37.17″N 19°56′16.53″E
- Completed: 1830 (current)

Fontanowska Tenement House (Polish: Kamienica Fontanowska) is a tenement located at 12 Main Market Square in Kraków in the District I Old Town.

== History ==
The building was created in 1830 by merging two former tenements: Fontanowska and Gutteterowska. The Fontanowska Tenement, in the second half of the 16th century and early 17th century, belonged to the Fontani family and later the Treflers. From 1763, it was owned by the Drelinkiewicz family, booksellers and bookbinders.

The Gutteterowska Tenement was built in the early 14th century (front section) and rebuilt in the mid-16th century into a city palace for the Gutteter family. In the 18th century, it was owned by, among others, the Girtler family.

Between 1826 and 1830, General Henryk Dembiński purchased and combined both tenements, giving them a unified facade. In the 1840s, the owner was Józef Haller. The tenement burned down during the Fire of Kraków in 1850 and was later rebuilt by the Mączyński family.

From 1791 to 1890, the first floor housed the Wieland confectionery. During World War II, it served as a workshop sewing uniforms for the German army, and until 1990, it was home to the Wanda fashion house.

Notable residents included sculptor and architect Baltazar Fontana and General Henryk Dembiński.

After 2014, the top floor was remodeled, and the window mullions on the second floor were removed.

On April 23, 1968, the tenement was entered into the Registry of Cultural Property. It is also entered into the municipal register of monuments of the Lesser Poland Voivodeship.
