= Bungard =

Bungard may refer to several villages in Romania:

- Bungard, a village in Lechinţa Commune, Bistriţa-Năsăud County
- Bungard, a village in Șelimbăr Commune, Sibiu County
