= Rosua =

River in Transylvania, Romania

- Location within Romania
- Native name: Roșua boten (Romanian)

Location
- Country: Romania
- Counties: Bistrița-Năsăud County
- Villages: Cepari, Blăjenii de Jos, Șintereag

Physical characteristics
- Mouth: Șieu
  - location: Șintereag
  - coordinates: 47.1722°N 24.2962°E
- Length: 21 km (13 mi)
- Basin size: 138 km^{2} (53 sq mi)

Basin features
- Progression: Șieu→ Someșul Mare→ Someș→ Tisza→ Danube→ Black Sea
- Tributaries
  - left: Valea Aurului, Valea Lungă, Valea Blăjenilor

The Rosua is a right tributary of the river Șieu in Romania. It discharges into the Șieu in Șintereag. Its length is 21 km (13 mi) and its basin size is 138 km^{2} (53 sq mi). Its tributaries are Valea Aurului, Valea Lungă and Valea Blăjenilor, all from the left.
