= Pintak =

Pintak may refer to two places in Bistrița-Năsăud County, Romania:

- Pintak, the German name for Pinticu village, Teaca Commune
- Pintak, the German name, and Pinták, the Hungarian name, for Slătinița village, Bistrița city
