= Supreme Commander of the Hungarian Revolutionary Army =

- A Honvédsereg fővezére

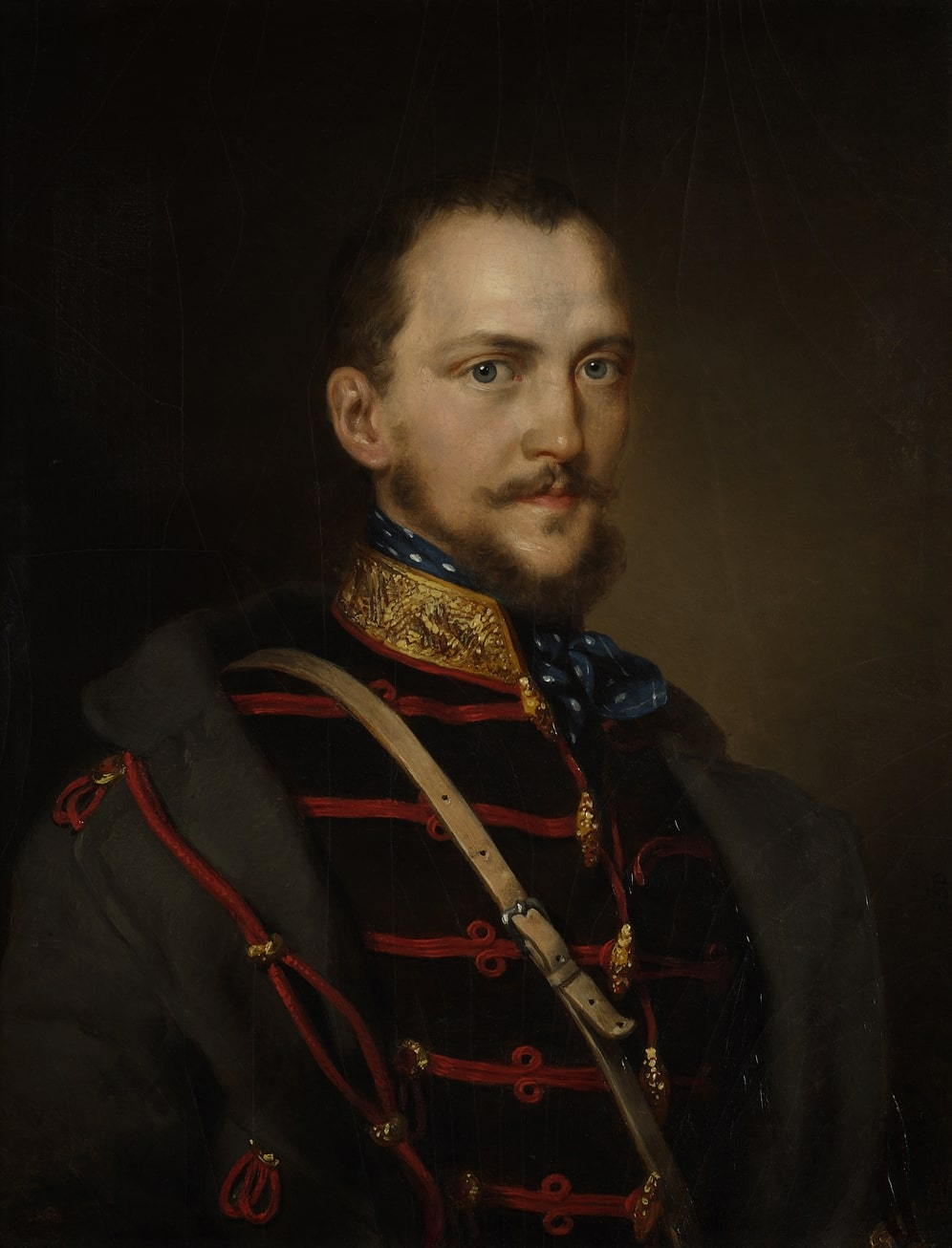
- Last holder Artúr Görgei; 11 August 1849 – 13 August 1849
- General Staff of the Army
- Type: de facto commander-in-chief
- Member of: General Staff
- Reports to: Governor–President
- Term length: No fixed term
- Formation: 15 September 1848
- First holder: Archduke Stephen
- Final holder: Artúr Görgei
- Abolished: 13 August 1849

The Supreme Commander of the Hungarian Revolutionary Army (Hungarian: A Honvédsereg fővezére) was the supreme military commander of the Hungarian Revolutionary Army during the Hungarian War of Independence of 1848–49. The title referred to the person entrusted with overall strategic control of the army, issuing orders to all military units and leading major operations, while still being subject to the political authority of the Hungarian war cabinet or Lajos Kossuth, Governor of Hungary.

== History ==
During the Hungarian War of Independence, the title fővezér referred to the supreme military commander of the Hungarian Honvéd Army. This was the highest military authority, responsible for directing major strategic operations, issuing orders to all corps and generals, and overseeing the overall conduct of the war. Unlike hereditary or permanently institutionalized military ranks in other European armies, the role of fővezér was created out of political and military necessity and depended on the confidence of the Hungarian government and, later, Governor-President Lajos Kossuth. The supreme commander’s authority included command over troop movements, operational planning, and war councils, while remaining subject to civilian political leadership.

The appointment of the supreme commander typically occurred through a government decree or by order of the Minister of War. However, because of the shifting political and military situation, the position was not stable or permanently assigned: commanders could be appointed or removed depending on battles won or lost, and on political alliances or conflicts within the revolutionary leadership. The office was first held in practice by Lázár Mészáros, who served both as Minister of War and commander of the Honvéd Army in the autumn of 1848, however, the de jure supreme commander was Archduke Stephen, Palatine of Hungary. From 1 November 1848, command of the main army was entrusted to Artúr Görgei, who became the next commander of the army. In early February 1849, Kossuth replaced him with the Polish general Henryk Dembiński, hoping for greater political loyalty. After Dembiński’s defeat at the Battle of Kápolna, Görgei was reinstated as supreme commander by the end of March 1849 and directed the army through the successful Spring Campaign.

It is important to distinguish the role of the supreme commander from that of Lajos Kossuth. While the fővezér exercised direct military command on the battlefield, Kossuth, as head of state and political leader, appointed or dismissed commanders, controlled the government, and represented the nation in domestic and diplomatic matters. Thus, the fővezér held the highest military position within a system that remained under civilian authority. The office was therefore both a military office and a reflection of how the Hungarian revolutionary state attempted to balance military necessity with political oversight.

== List of officeholders ==
No.	Portrait	Name (Birth–Death)	Term of office			Reports to
No.	Portrait	Name (Birth–Death)	Took office	Left office	Tenure	Reports to
1		His Imperial and Royal Highness; Archduke; Stephen Francis (1817–1867)	15 September 1848	22 September 1848	7 days	Prime Minister; Lajos Batthyány
2		General; János Móga (1784–1861)	22 September 1848	1 November 1848	40 days	Prime Minister; Lajos Kossuth
3		General; Artúr Görgei (1818–1916)	1 November 1848	February 1849	3 months	Prime Minister; Lajos Kossuth
4		General Count; Henryk Dembiński (1791–1864)	February 1849	8 March 1849	1 month	Prime Minister; Lajos Kossuth
5		General; Antal Vetter (1803–1882)	8 March 1849	31 March 1849	23 days	Prime Minister; Lajos Kossuth
(3)		General; Artúr Görgei (1818–1916)	31 March 1849	1 July 1849	92 days	Governor–President; Lajos Kossuth
6		General; Lázár Mészáros (1796–1858)	1 July 1849	26 July 1849	25 days	Governor–President; Lajos Kossuth
(4)		General Count; Henryk Dembiński (1791–1864)	26 July 1849	9 August 1849	14 days	Governor–President; Lajos Kossuth
7		General; Józef Bem (1794–1850)	9 August 1849	11 August 1849	2 days	Governor–President; Lajos Kossuth
(3)		General; Artúr Görgei (1818–1916) acting	11 August 1849	13 August 1849	2 days	—

== See also ==
- Hungarian Defence Forces
- List of heads of state of Hungary
- Kingdom of Hungary (1526–1867)
- Hungarian Revolution of 1848

== Sources ==
- Bona, Gábor. Hadikrónika 1848–1849. Budapest: Zrínyi Kiadó, 2001.
- Gelich, Tivadar. A honvédsereg fővezérei és tábornokai 1848–49-ben. Budapest: Akadémiai Kiadó, 1964.
- Hermann, Róbert. Az 1848–49-es szabadságharc katonai története. Budapest: Osiris Kiadó, 2001.
- Deák, István. The Lawful Revolution: Louis Kossuth and the Hungarians, 1848–1849. New York: Columbia University Press, 1979.
- Bánlaky, József. A magyar nemzet hadtörténete, XXII–XXIV. kötet: Az 1848–49. évi szabadságharc hadtörténete. Budapest, 1930.
- Rothenberg, Gunther E. “The Austrian Army in Hungary, 1848–1849.” Journal of Modern History 34, no. 2 (1962): 125–143.
