= Dipșa =

River in Romania

- Location within Romania

Location
- Country: Romania
- Counties: Bistrița-Năsăud County
- Villages: Ocnița, Dipșa, Galații Bistriței, Chiraleș

Physical characteristics
- Mouth: Șieu
  - location: Chiraleș
  - coordinates: 47.0968°N 24.3080°E
- Length: 35 km (22 mi)
- Basin size: 459 km^{2} (177 sq mi)

Basin features
- Progression: Șieu→ Someșul Mare→ Someș→ Tisza→ Danube→ Black Sea

The Dipșa is a left tributary of the river Șieu in Romania. It flows into the Șieu near Chiraleș. Its length is 35 km (22 mi) and its basin size is 459 km^{2} (177 sq mi).

The following rivers are tributaries to the river Dipșa:

- Left: Archiud, Lechința, Chiraleș
- Right: Pintic, Valea Mică
