= Lechința Solar Park =

Photovoltaic power stations in Romania

- Country: Romania
- Location: Lechința, Bistrița-Năsăud County
- Coordinates: 47°01′N 24°20′E
- Status: Operational
- Commission date: 2012
- Construction cost: €6.2 million
- Owner: DayLight Energy Group

Solar farm
- Type: Flat-panel PV

Power generation
- Nameplate capacity: 1.7 MW

Lechința Solar Park, a large thin-film photovoltaic (PV) power system, lies on a 3.4 ha (8.4 acres) plot of land near the Lechința commune in Romania. The power plant is a 1.7-megawatt solar power system using state-of-the-art thin film technology, and was completed in August 2012, one month after construction started. The solar park features 6,762 solar panels and 54 string inverters. It supplies 1,000 MWh of electricity per year.

The installation is located in Bistrița-Năsăud County, in central-northern Romania. The investment cost for the Lechința solar park amounted to some €6.2 million.

== See also ==
- Energy policy of the European Union
- Photovoltaics
- Renewable energy commercialization
- Renewable energy in the European Union
- Solar power in Romania
