= Batthyány's sanctuary lamp =

National monument in Lipótváros, Budapest, Hungary

Coordinates: 47.50601°N 19.05196°E

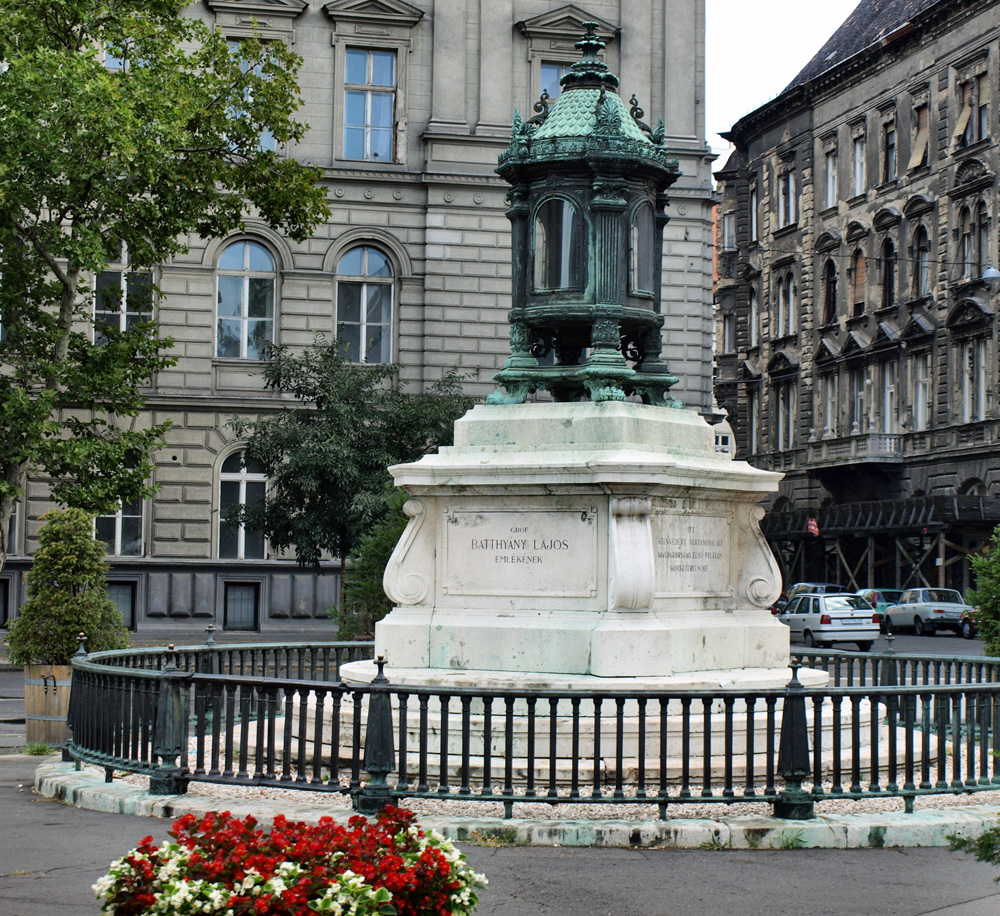
Batthyány's sanctuary lamp

Batthyány's sanctuary lamp (Hungarian: Batthyány Lajos-örökmécses) is a national monument, located at the corner of Báthory Street and Hold Street in Lipótváros, Budapest, Hungary. It sits on the former location of the courtyard of the New Building, where Count Lajos Batthyány (1807–1849), the first Prime Minister of Hungary, was executed on 6 October 1849.

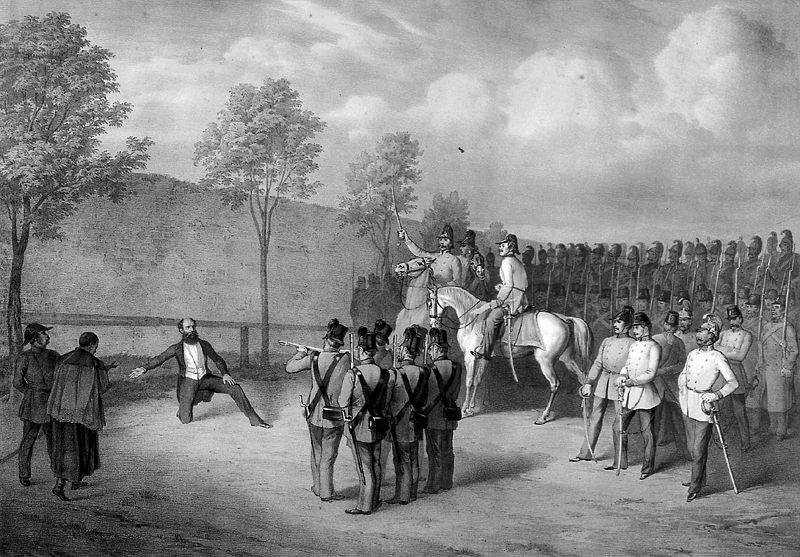
Execution of Lajos Batthyány on the courtyard of the New Building

In 1905, architect Móric Pogány's design, a large lantern, was chosen, though construction was delayed by the First World War. The unveiling ceremony occurred on 6 October 1926, with István Lebó, the last living army PFC who served during the Hungarian Revolution of 1848, present.

This monument has been the site of several street demonstrations of opposition in 1941, 1943 and 1988.
