= Antal Vetter =

Hungarian general

General Antal Vetter de Doggenfeld
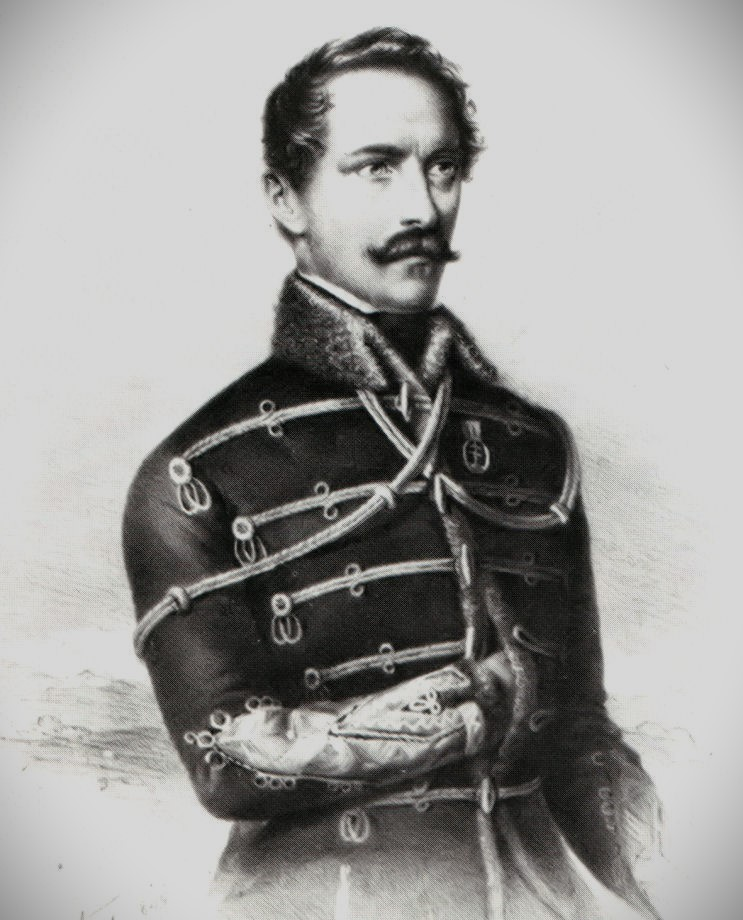
- Lithograph by József Marastoni

Supreme Commander of the Hungarian Revolutionary Army
- In office 8 March 1849 – 31 March 1849
- Prime Minister: Lajos Kossuth
- Preceded by: Henryk Dembiński
- Succeeded by: Artúr Görgei

Personal details
- Born: 3 July 1803 Mestre, Venetian Province, Habsburg monarchy
- Died: 26 July 1882 (aged 79) Budapest, Austria-Hungary
- Resting place: Kerepesi Cemetery, Budapest
- Education: Theresian Military Academy
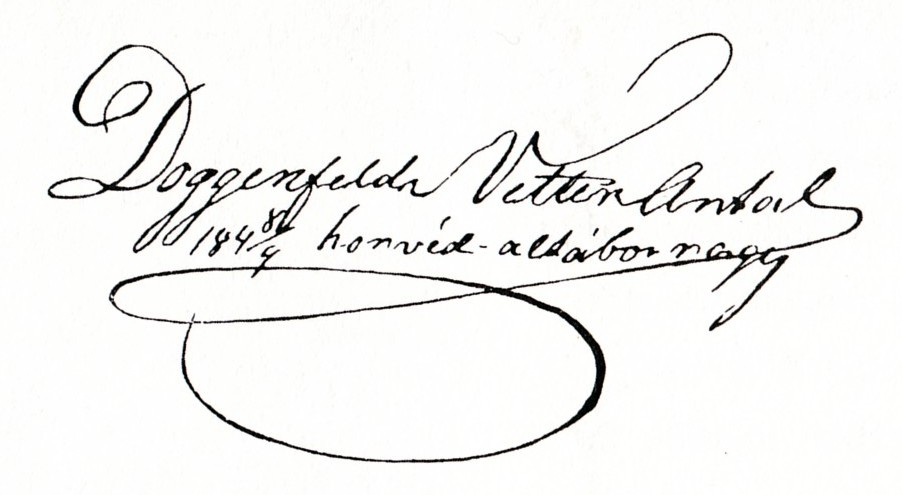
- Signature

Military service
- Allegiance: Hungarian State (1849); Austria-Hungary
- Branch/service: Hungarian Revolutionary Army; Austro-Hungarian Army
- Years of service: 1823–1848; 1859–1866
- Rank: Lieutenant general

Antal Vetter (German: Anton Vetter von Doggenfeld) was a Hungarian general known for his participation in the Hungarian Revolution of 1848.
