= Pintic (river) =

Tributary in Romania

- Location within Romania

Location
- Country: Romania
- Counties: Bistrița-Năsăud County
- Villages: Posmuș, Pinticu, Teaca

Physical characteristics
- Mouth: Dipșa
  - location: near Teaca
  - coordinates: 46.9191°N 24.4861°E
- Length: 16 km (9.9 mi)
- Basin size: 52 km^{2} (20 sq mi)

Basin features
- Progression: Dipșa→ Șieu→ Someșul Mare→ Someș→ Tisza→ Danube→ Black Sea

The Pintic is a right tributary of the river Dipșa in Romania. It flows into the Dipșa near Teaca. Its length is 16 km (9.9 mi) and its basin size is 52 km^{2} (20 sq mi).
