= Antónia Zichy =

Hungarian noblewoman

Countess Antónia Zichy
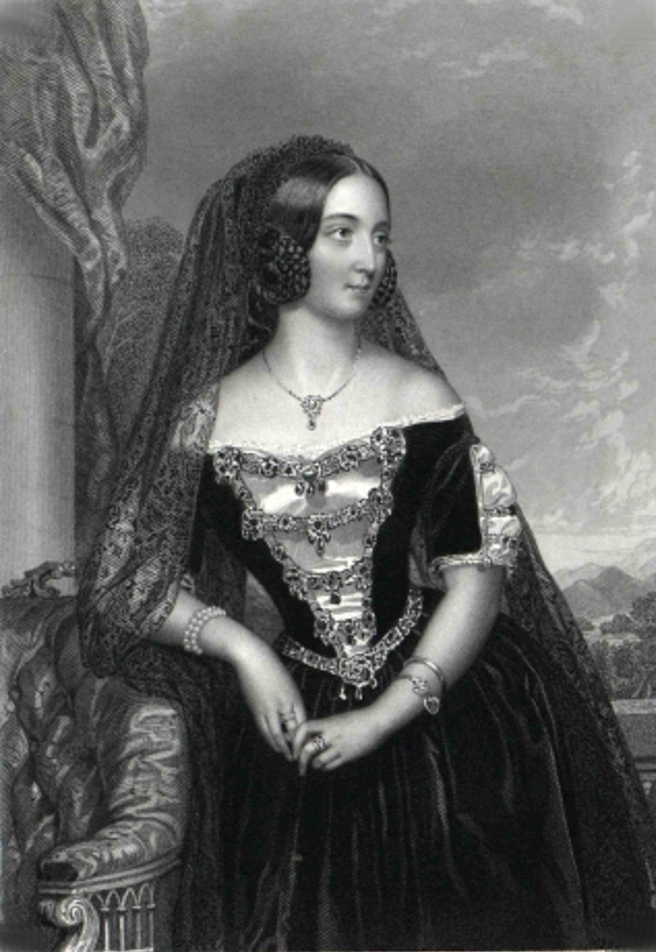
- Full name: Antónia Erzsébet Valburga Zichy de Zich and Vázsonykő
- Native name: Zichi és vázsonykői Zichy Antónia Erzsébet Valburga
- Born: 14 July 1816; Cífer, Kingdom of Hungary
- Died: 28 September 1888 (aged 72); Dáka, Kingdom of Hungary
- Noble family: Zichy of Zich and Vázsonykő
- Issue: Elemér Battyhány, Ilona Battyhány
- Father: Károly Zichy de Zich and Vázsonykő
- Mother: Antónia Battyhány de Németújvár

Countess Antónia Erzsébet Valburga Zichy de Zich et Vásonkeő (Cífer, Kingdom of Hungary, 14 July 1816 – Dáka, Kingdom of Hungary, 25 September 1888) was a Hungarian noblewoman best known as the wife of Lajos Batthyány, the first Prime Minister of Hungary, who was executed for his participation in the Hungarian Revolution of 1848.

== Life ==
=== Early life ===
Countess Antónia Erzsébet Valburga Zichy de Zich et Vásonkeő was born into an old Hungarian aristocratic family on 14 July 1816 in Cífer, Kingdom of Hungary (today Cífer, Slovakia). Her father, Count Károly Zichy de Zich et Vásonkeő (1785–1876) served as an imperial and royal chamberlain and was a landowner. Her paternal grandparents were Count Ferenc Zichy (1749–1812) and Countess Maria Anna von Kolowrat-Krakowsky (1753–1805). Her mother was Countess Antónia Batthyány de Németújvár (1789–1825). Her maternal grandparents were Count János Nepomuk Battyhány de Németújvár (1745–1831), a landowner, and Countess Maria Johanna Antonia zu Herberstein (1766–1838). Her godparents were János Knapich royal chamberlain and his wife, Anna Szilágyi.

She was the sixth of nine children born into her parents' marriage. She had wife older siblings: Anna, who married Prince August Odescalchi, Mária (1810–1838), who married Baron Wilhelm von Walterskirchen, Antal, who was born in 1811 and died at a young age, Karolina, born in 1812 and died young and József (1814–1897), who married Melanie von Metternich-Winneburg. Her younger siblings were Károly (1817–1832), Karolina (1818–1903), who married Count György Károlyi de Nagykároly and János Nepomuk (1820–1911), who married Baroness Irma Kray de Krajova and Topolya.

=== Married life ===
Countess Zichy married Count Lajos Battyhány de Németújvár on 4 December 1834, in Pozsony (today Bratislava, Slovakia). They lived at the Battyhány Castle in Ikervár. Their son, Elemér, was born in 1846.

Lajos Battyhány was active in Hungarian politics and became the first president of the Opposition Party when it was formed in 1847. In early 1848, he was a member of the delegation sent to Vienna to King Ferdinand V, who, on March 17, entrusted him with forming the first Hungarian government. Thus, Battyhány became the first independent Prime Minister of Hungary.

The countess accompanied her husband to Pest and actively supported the revolution. On 2 October, upon seeing that he couldn't reach a compromise with the Viennese court, Battyhány resigned, but continued his service in the military.

On 9 January 1849, as they were having dinner with the countess' sister, Karolina, Battyhány was arrested. The family initially hoped that he would soon be released, but in September 1849, after the defeat of the revolution in August, he was sentenced to death by hanging.

The countess was allowed to see her husband for a last time on October 5. She managed to smuggle a small knife used for cutting paper, which Battyhány used to cut his carotid artery. As he couldn't be hung any longer, he was executed by fire squad on the following day.

=== Later life ===
The widowed countess had to leave the country, and moved to Geneva with her children. She only returned ten years later, for a Requiem that the Hungarian youth organised to remember Battyhány, who was secretly buried in the walls of the crypt of the Franciscan church in Pest and only received a funeral and official burial in 1870.

When her son met Countess Marie Louise von Wallersee, the niece of Queen Elisabeth of Hungary, and intended to marry her, Countess Zichy exclaimed in a letter: "We do not marry into the murderer family!", as she could never forgive King Franz Joseph I, Elisabeth's husband, for ordering the execution of her late husband. She threatened her son with committing suicide on the day of the wedding, and the marriage plans were abandoned.

On 13 March 1862, she and Emília Csernovics, widow of János Damjanich, a martyr of Arad, founded the Association of Hungarian Housewives.
