= Sfântu Gheorghe (disambiguation) =

Sfântu Gheorghe means "Saint George" in the Romanian language. It may refer to one of the following places in Romania:

- Sfântu Gheorghe, a city in Covasna County
- Sfântu Gheorghe, Tulcea, a commune in Tulcea County
- Sfântu Gheorghe, Ialomița, a commune in Ialomița County
- Sfântu Gheorghe, a village in Iernut town, Mureș County
- Sfântu Gheorghe, a village in Băneasa Commune, Giurgiu County
- Sfântu Gheorghe, a village in Crevedia Mare Commune, Giurgiu County

and to:

- Sfântu Gheorghe branch, a distributary of the Danube river
- FC Sfîntul Gheorghe, a football team in Moldova

== See also ==
- Sângeorgiu (disambiguation)
