= New Building =

Former fortress in Budapest, Hungary

Coordinates: 47.5047°N 19.0503°E

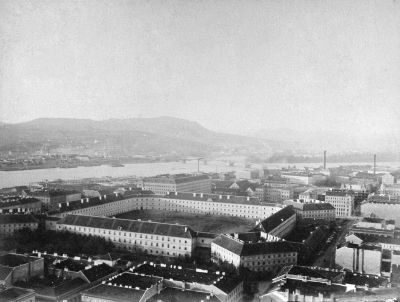
The New Building in 1880

The New Building (in Hungarian Újépület, in German Neugebäude) was a fortress located in Pest as a jail. The construction began under the direction of János Hild, the father of József Hild and dissolved in 1897, it became the nickname the Hungarian Bastille. Found on his old footprint the current Szabadság tér.

== History ==
For the order Emperor's Joseph II it designed by Isidore Canevale an architect Viennese. The construction of the building surrounded an immense rectangular courtyard in 1786 began under direction János Hild. His son József Hild, the future renowned architect won here his first professional experiences. The intended use of the building fortress was not known to the public in that way the subject was object of speculations. Large parts of the building made gradually; in 1789 the pavilion 3 was already in use. The construction was adjacent to the ground floor, had two floors with four smaller angles, but on the higher level rectangular buildings were built that were linked to the short side of the main building structures associated with it, rectangular so that life were towers; on its four corners of the wall of the building. The high-end 100 fathoms (cca. 183 m) over the main wall occupied almost 10,000 square-fathoms (3.35 ha). There was no particular architectural value of the building. The mysterious building was built in the middle of the desert, because also a large area spread between the houses and the former wing of the city began the building, which has not been cured with sand. After the death of Joseph II the work was not yet completed, and the outbreak of the Napoleonic wars in the meantime hindered the continuous construction. It was used as a prison between 1793 and 1796, with the captured French officers being held here. In 1802, the building was almost made to sell for Jews of Prague who had made an offer. Count Ferenc Széchényi the former spokesman of the Court has done against the planned sale, since the construction of the money received from Joseph II (assets of the Hungarian priesthood confiscated). The sale was not the case, however, the continuation of construction were captured in 1814, and when the building is finished, the barracks became to the newly organized Fifth Artillery Regiment.

== As place of executions ==
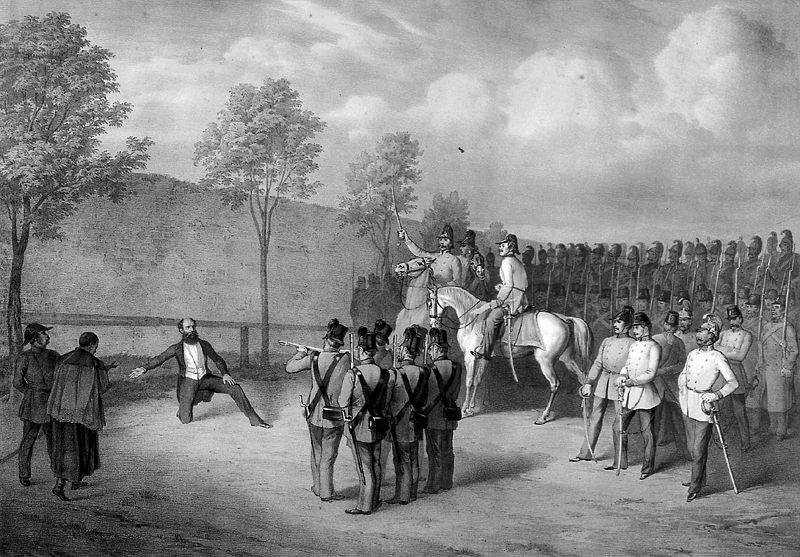
The execution of Lajos Batthyány in the courtyard of the New building

The First Prime Minister of the Independent Hungarian State Lajos Batthyány was executed in the court of the New building after the 1848–1849 revolution and the war of independence with the overthrow of Hungarian patriots executed 6 October 1849, still the same day with the 13 Martyrs of Arad. For the execution memory of the former guardians raised on the northeastern corner the Batthyány's sanctuary lamp. In addition were executed László Csány, the Minister of Transport, and on 24 October, Zsigmond Perényi, the second president of the Chamber, on 20 October, in the morning in the nearby Piazza Fa (now near the Ministry of Agriculture) the Polish Prince Mieczysław Woroniecki, a lieutenant colonel Peter Giron and Karol d'Abancourt de Franqueville Polish nobleman on 10 October 1849.

== Sources ==
- Tanulmányok Budapest múltjából
- Palóczi, Edgár. Woroniecki-Korybut Miecisłav herceg. Lengyel-magyar emlékek.
- Berza, László, ed. (1993). Budapest lexikon II. (L–Z) (2nd ed.). Budapest: Akadémiai Kiadó. p. 554. ISBN 963-05-6411-4.
- Magyarország és Erdély eredeti képekben. Darmstadt. 1856. p. 131.
- A pesti Újépület - egy kis történelem
- Az Újépület Pest belterületének kataszteri térképén (1785)
