= Strzałków, Świętokrzyskie Voivodeship =

Strzałków
- Village
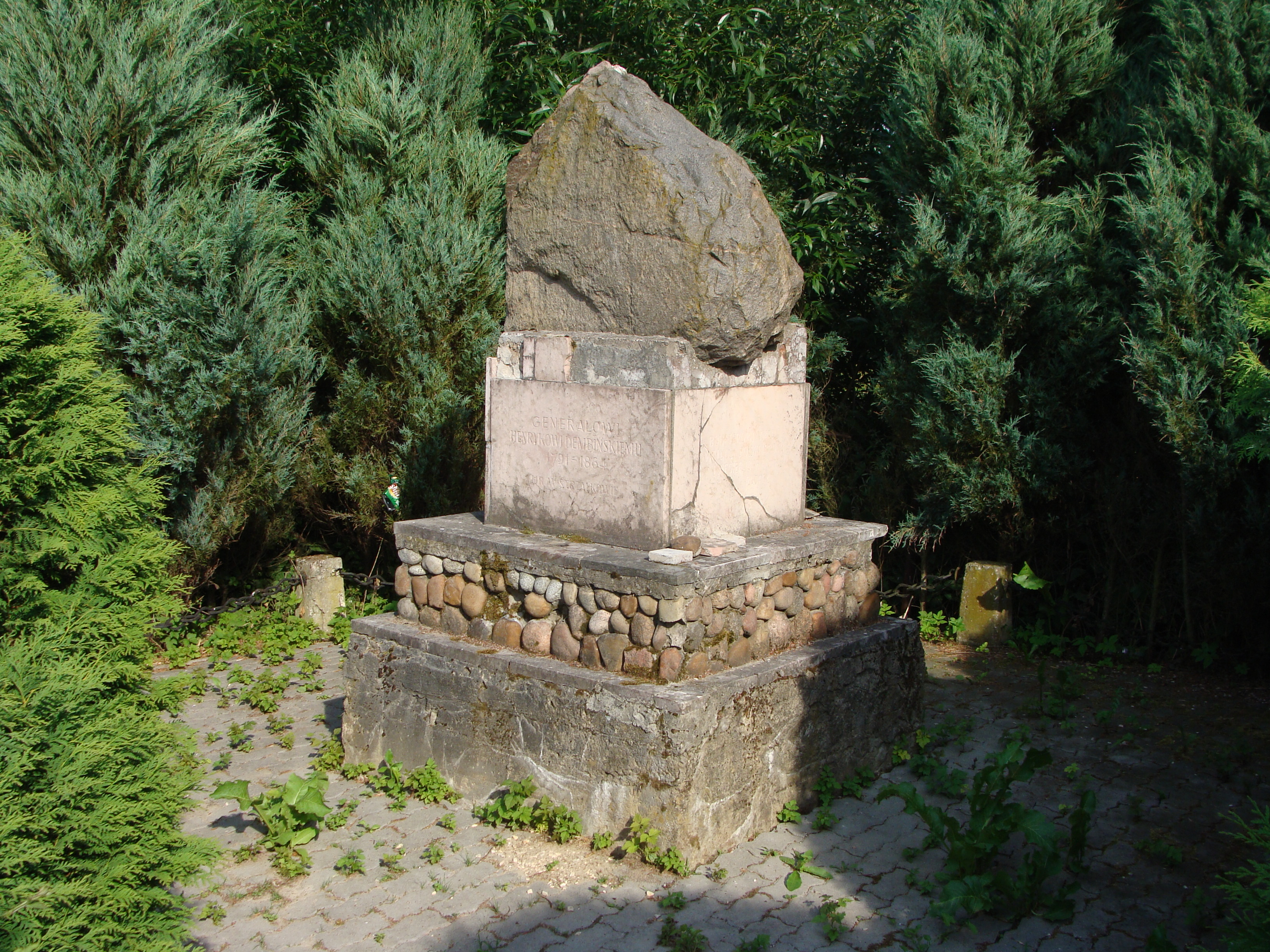
- Monument to Gen. Henryk Dembiński who was born in Strzałków

- Location within Poland
- Coordinates: 50°28′18″N 20°50′53″E
- Country: Poland
- Voivodeship: Świętokrzyskie
- County: Busko
- Gmina: Stopnica

Strzałków [ˈstʂau̯kuf] is a village in the administrative district of Gmina Stopnica, within Busko County, Świętokrzyskie Voivodeship, in south-central Poland. It lies approximately 8 km (5 mi) north-west of Stopnica, 10 km (6 mi) east of Busko-Zdrój, and 49 km (30 mi) south of the regional capital Kielce.
