= Lázár Mészáros =

Hungarian military figure (1796–1858)

General Lázár Mészáros de Pacsér
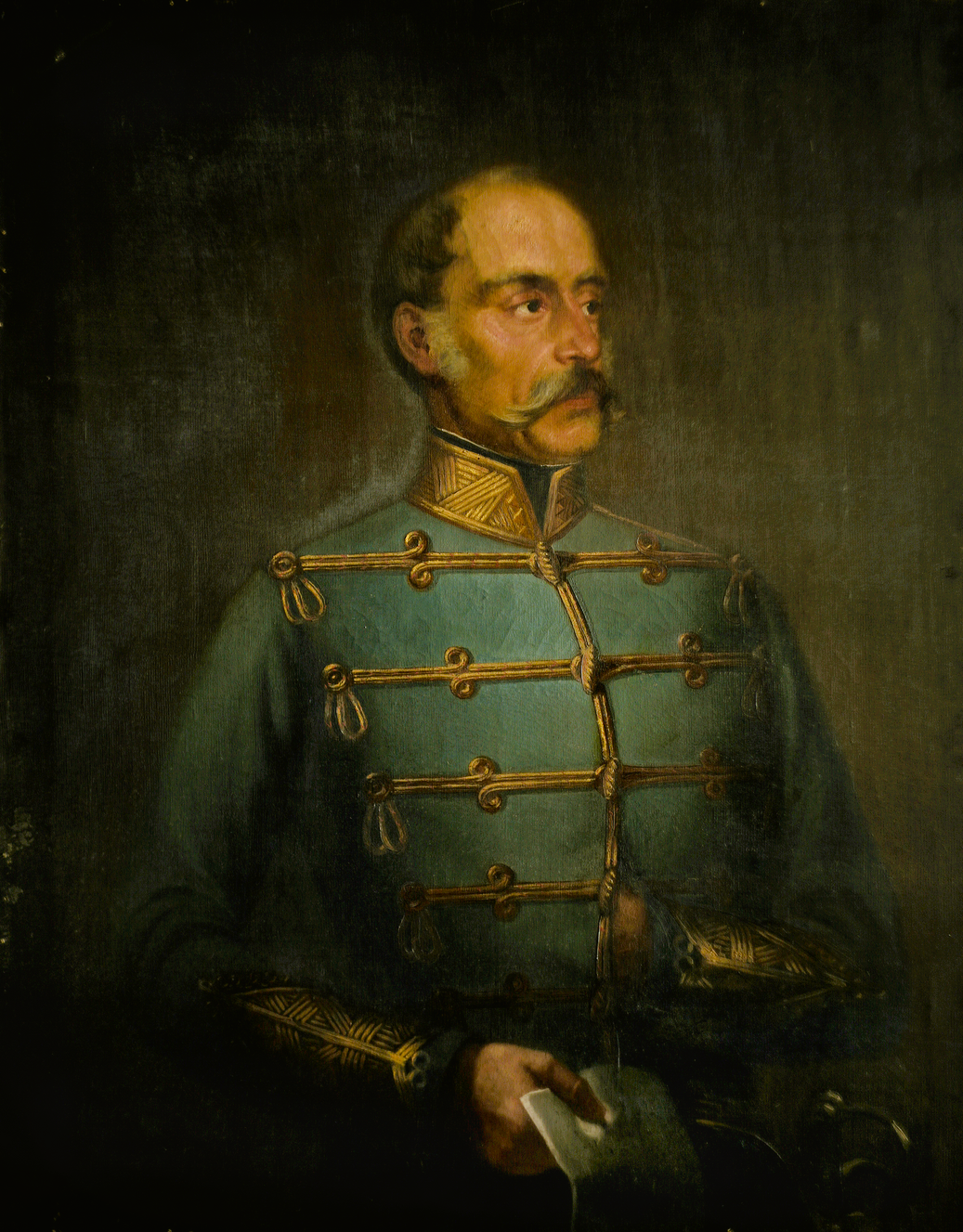
- Portrait by an unknown painter, 1838

Minister of War of the Hungarian State
- In office 28 April 1849 – 6 May 1849
- Prime Minister: Bertalan Szemere
- Preceded by: János Damjanich
- Succeeded by: György Klapka
- In office 14 April 1849 – 28 April 1849
- Prime Minister: Bertalan Szemere
- Preceded by: himself
- Succeeded by: János Damjanich

Minister of War of the Kingdom of Hungary
- In office 23 May 1848 – 14 April 1849
- Prime Minister: Lajos Batthyány; Lajos Kossuth
- Preceded by: Office established
- Succeeded by: himself

Supreme Commander of the Hungarian Revolutionary Army
- In office 1 July 1849 – 26 July 1849
- Governor: Lajos Kossuth
- Preceded by: Artúr Görgei
- Succeeded by: Henryk Dembiński

Personal details
- Born: 20 February 1796 Baja, Kingdom of Hungary
- Died: 16 November 1858 (aged 62) Eywood, England
- Resting place: Saint Roch Cemetery Chapel, Baja

Military service
- Allegiance: Hungarian Revolutionary Army
- Branch/service: Hussar
- Years of service: 1813–1849
- Rank: Lieutenant General
- Battles/wars: Napoleonic Wars; Hungarian Revolution of 1848

General Lázár Mészáros (English: Lazarus Mészáros) (20 February 1796 in Baja – 16 November 1858 in Eywood), was the Minister of War during the 1848 Hungarian Revolution.

== Biography ==
He was born into a noble family of landowners. His parents died when he was four; as a child he was moved from one relative to another. He had his schooling in Baja, Szabadka (today Subotica), Pest and Pécs. Mészáros dropped out of his studies of law and joined the military.

=== Military career ===
In 1813, he became Lieutenant in a cavalry regiment in Bács-Bodrog County. He took part in the war against Napoleon. He was an officer of the 7th regiment of hussars from 1816 to 1837; then he was put in charge of the 5th regiment of hussars. He spent 18 years in Italy with his regiment. Field marshal Radetzky discovered the talented hussar officer, and, based on Radetzky's suggestion, he was promoted to be a colonel (1845). He also became his regiment's commandant.

Lázár Mészáros was a highly cultivated officer. He spoke seven languages. He was well versed in military matters, but he was also knowledgeable about society and the economy. In 1837, he started to correspond by mail with István Széchenyi. Mészáros was elected to be a mailing member of the Magyar Tudós Társaság (English: Hungarian Erudite Association, today: Hungarian Academy of Sciences). He chose the theme "Armed forces in modern bourgeois societies" for his inaugural.

=== Minister of War ===
On Lajos Kossuth's suggestion Lajos Batthyány appointed Mészáros to be Minister of War in the first responsible Hungarian government (22 March 1848). He took up his office after returning from Italy, where his regiment was posted (23 May). Some time later he became Major general of the Imperial and Royal forces and the commander of Imperial troops stationed on Hungarian territory.

As Minister of War, Lázár Mészáros was the intellectual founder of Hungary's defensive army. In July 1848, he became parliamentary delegate of his hometown, Baja, as well.

From the end of August, Mészáros decided to take personal control of the southern army. He travelled to Vajdaság (today Vojvodina, Serbia). On 30 September, he returned to the capital. Mészáros was the only member of Batthyány's government who did not resign. He became the member of the Territorial Defence Committee as the Minister of War. On 13 December, he took command of the northern army with 10,000 men. On 19 January 1849, he was discharged from his command, but he retained his post as Minister until the declaration of the Independence Statement. On 26 July, Mészáros resigned from all his remaining military functions, because he did not agree with the way Mór Perczel commanded the parts of the army under his control. After the Battle of Temesvár, and the ensuing failure of the war of independence, he left Hungary on 14 August 1849 for Turkey.

=== Exile ===
He left Turkey in May 1851. He settled at first in France, which he left upon Napoleon III's coup d'état in December 1851. He went to the Isle of Jersey. In the summer of 1853, he moved to the United States, where he tried farming in Iowa, and eventually settled in Flushing, New York. In October 1858, a short time before his death, Mészáros returned to England.

=== Last will ===
In his will, he requested that his remains not be returned to Hungary "until the last foreign soldier has left". He was reburied in Baja 133 years after his death, on 15 March 1991. The last Soviet soldiers – always seen by Hungarians as the successors of the Imperial Russian Army that crushed the Revolution 1848 – had left Hungary just months before.

The caption of his grave in Titley, England

To the memory of General Lázár Mészáros Minister of war And Commander in Chief Of the Hungarian Army in 1848–1849. Who was born at Baja in the county of Bács 1796 and died at Eywood 6-th November 1858 in the 63 year of his age and 10-th of his exile. This stone is inscribed by his sorrowing friend J. E. H. Lady Langdale

Mészáros Lázár Tábornoknak, A jó Hazafinak, A vitéz Katonának A nemes Barátnak.

(The last sentence is in Hungarian. It means: To General Lázár Mészáros, the good Patriot, the valiant Soldier, the noble Friend.)

Political offices
Preceded by Lajos Batthyány	Minister of War; 1848–1849	Succeeded by Artúr Görgey
