= Lechința (Dipșa) =

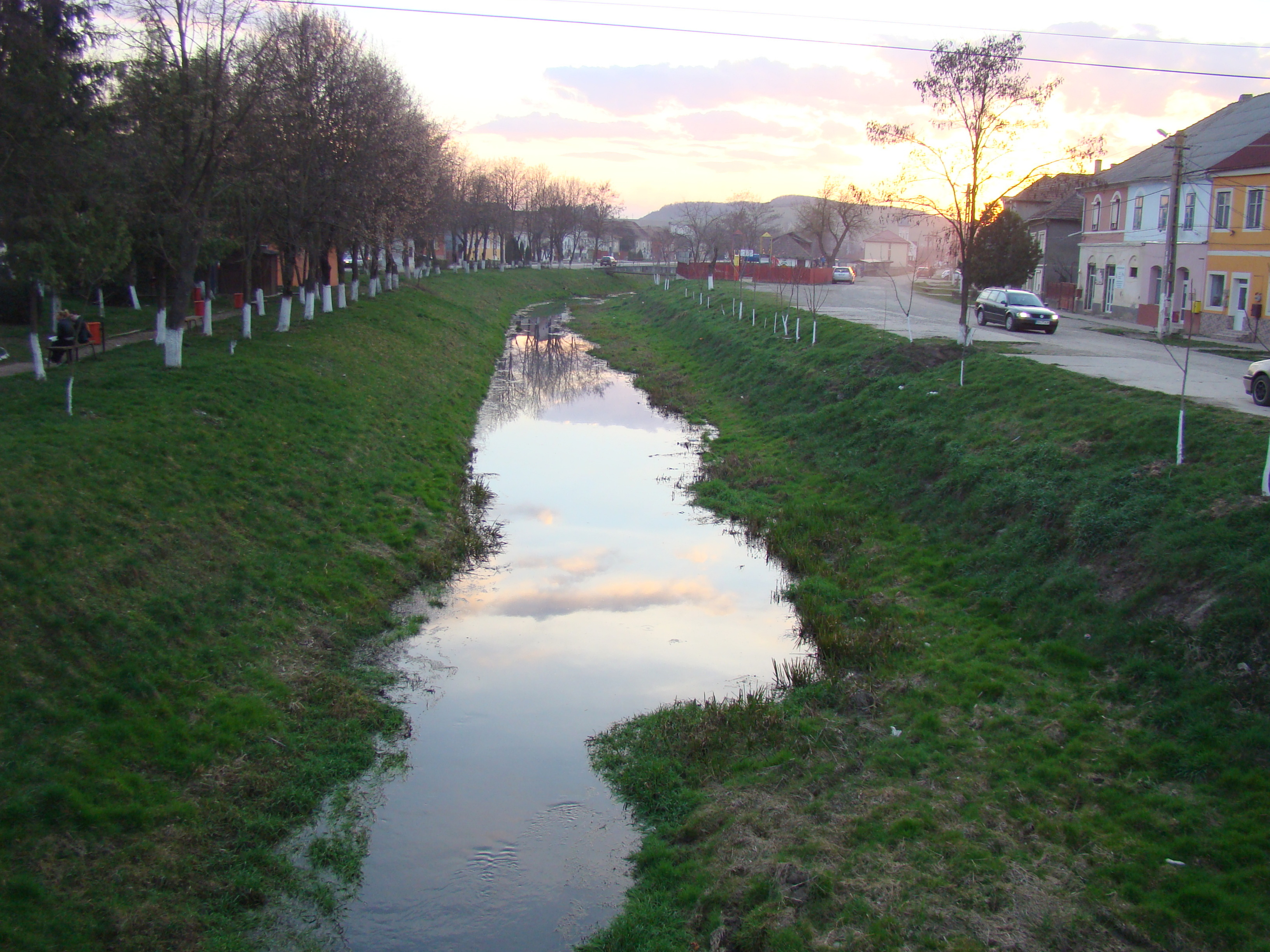

- Location within Romania

Location
- Country: Romania
- Counties: Bistrița-Năsăud County
- Villages: Sânmihaiu de Câmpie, Sângeorzu Nou, Vermeș, Lechința

Physical characteristics
- Mouth: Dipșa
  - location: near Lechința
  - coordinates: 47°02′17″N 24°20′42″E
- Length: 25 km (16 mi)
- Basin size: 164 km^{2} (63 sq mi)

Basin features
- Progression: Dipșa→ Șieu→ Someșul Mare→ Someș→ Tisza→ Danube→ Black Sea
- Tributaries
  - left: Pucioasa, Bungard
  - right: Brăteni

The Lechința is a left tributary of the river Dipșa in Romania. It discharges into the Dipșa near the village Lechința. Its length is 25 km (16 mi) and its basin size is 164 km^{2} (63 sq mi).
