= Henryk Dembiński =

Polish general (1791–1864)

General Count Henryk Dembiński
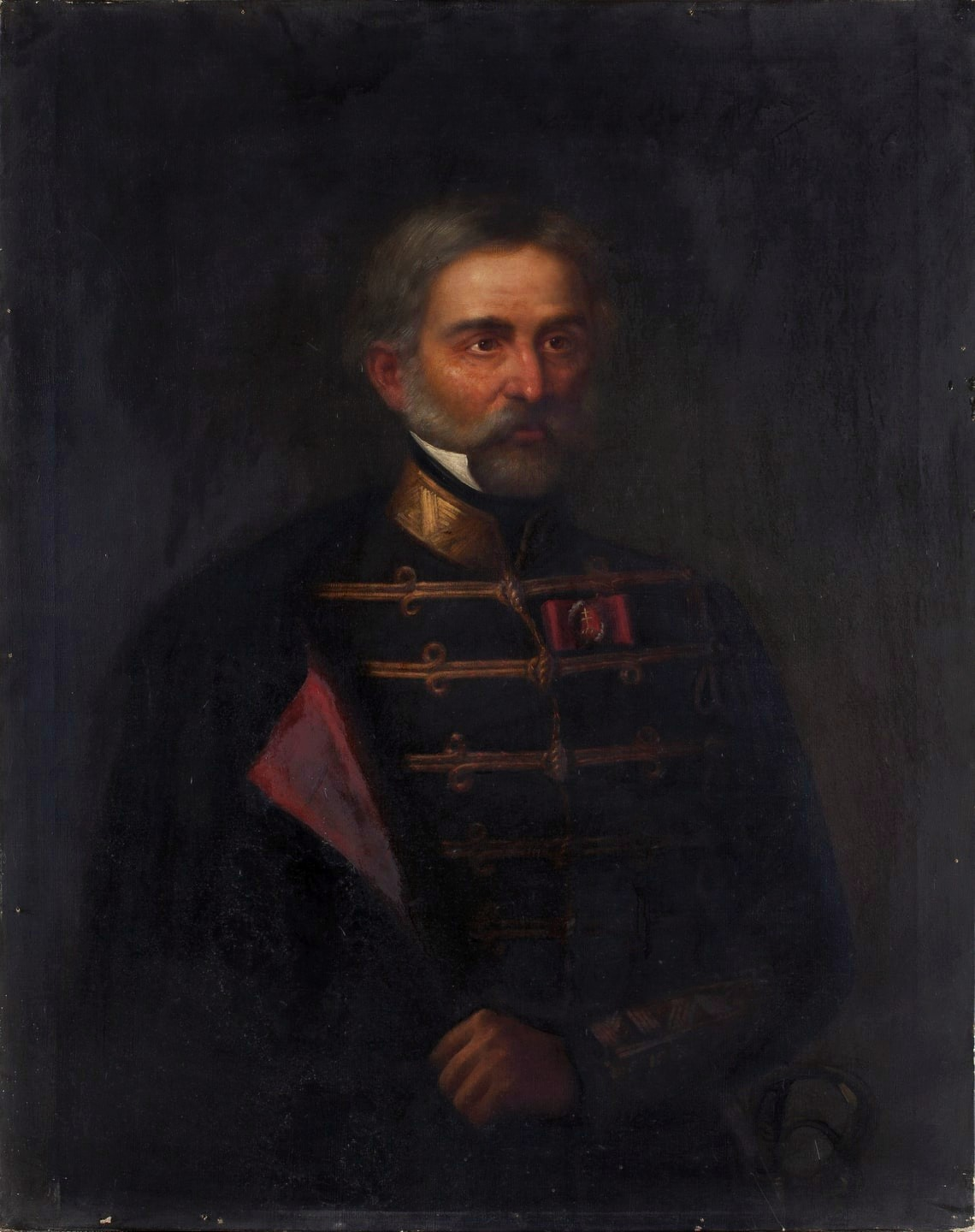
- General Dembiński in a Hungarian hussar uniform – Portrait by an unknown painter (1880)

Supreme Commander of the Hungarian Revolutionary Army
- In office 26 July 1849 – 9 August 1849
- Governor: Lajos Kossuth
- Preceded by: Lázár Mészáros
- Succeeded by: Józef Bem
- In office February 1849 – 8 March 1849
- Prime Minister: Lajos Kossuth
- Preceded by: Artúr Görgei
- Succeeded by: Antal Vetter

Personal details
- Born: 16 January 1791 Strzałków, Świętokrzyskie Voivodeship,
- Died: 13 July 1864 (aged 73) Paris, France
- Awards: Légion d'honneur (1813)

Military service
- Allegiance: Duchy of Warsaw; Congress Poland; Hungarian Revolutionary Army
- Branch/service: Army
- Rank: Lieutenant general
- Battles: Napoleonic Wars; Battle of Leipzig; November Uprising; Battle of Debe Wielkie; Battle of Ostrołęka; Hungarian Revolution of 1848; Battle of Kápolna; Battle of Szőreg; Battle of Temesvár

Count Henryk Dembiński (Hungarian: Dembinszky Henrik; 16 January 1791 – 13 July 1864) was a Polish engineer, traveler and general. (Note: The family name is spelt Demhinski in some English sources.)

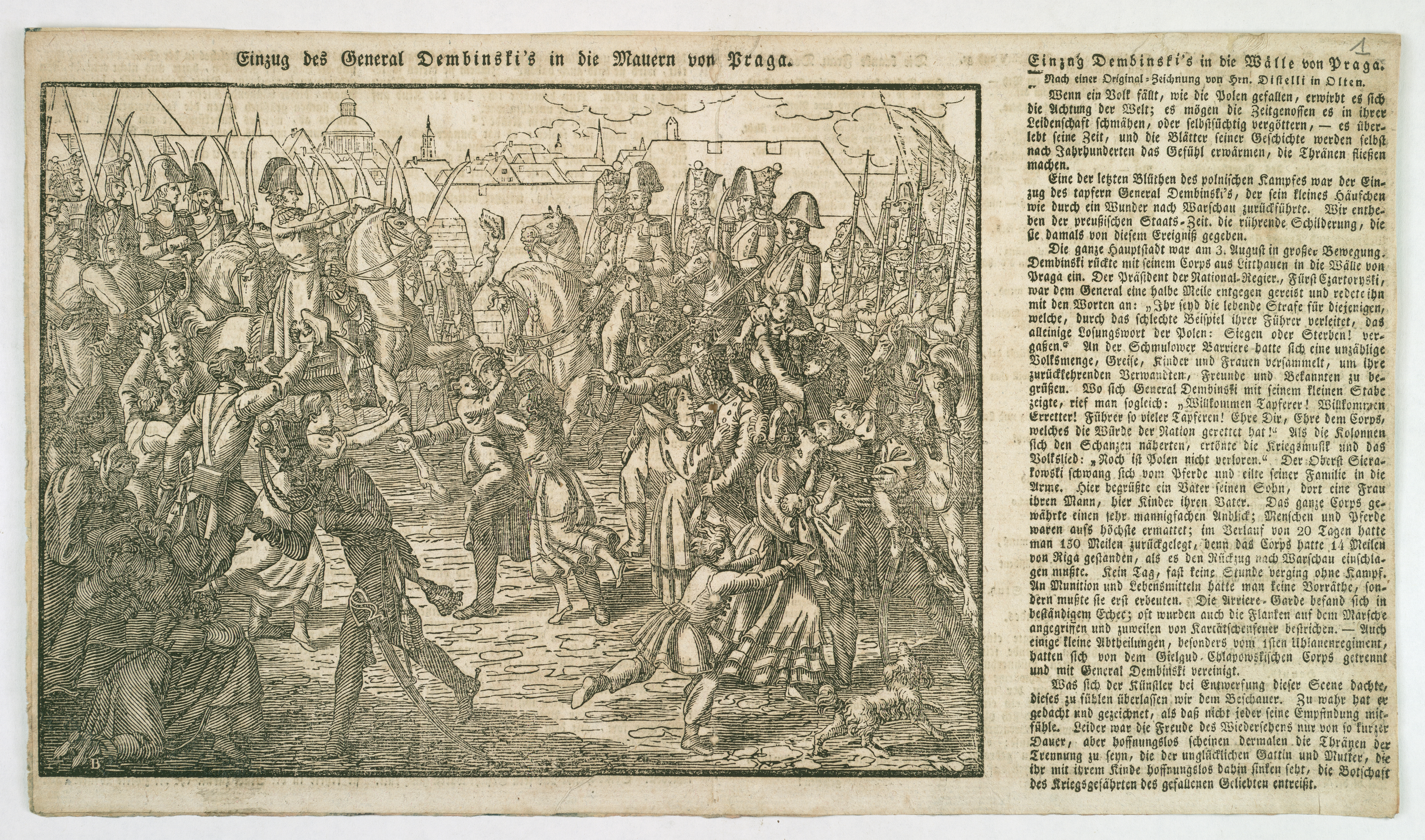
The General's triumphant entry into Praga (district of Warsaw).

Dembiński was born in Strzałków, Świętokrzyskie Voivodeship. In 1809 he entered the Polish army of the Duchy of Warsaw and took part in most of the Napoleonic campaigns in the East. Among others, he took part in the Battle of Leipzig in 1813. After the fall of Napoleon Bonaparte he remained in Poland and became one of the members of the Sejm of the Congress Poland.

In the Polish November Uprising of 1830, he was a successful leader of the Polish forces. In 1831, after his victorious campaign in Lithuania, he was promoted to generał dywizji and for a brief period became the Polish Commander-in-Chief. He took part in the battles of Dębe Wielkie and Ostrołęka.

After the fall of the revolution in 1833 he emigrated to France, where he became one of the prominent politicians of the Hôtel Lambert, a group of supporters of Adam Jerzy Czartoryski.

In the Hungarian revolution of 1848 he was appointed the commanding officer of the Northern Army. After his successes he was soon promoted and Lajos Kossuth appointed him the Hungarian commander-in-chief. He was hampered by the jealousy of Artúr Görgey and after the defeat at the Battle of Kápolna, he resigned. After the Battle of Temesvár (where he was commander until the arrival of Józef Bem) and Kossuth's resignation, he fled to Turkey, where he (together with many other prominent Polish officers) entered the service of sultan Mahmud II. However, in 1850 he returned to Paris, where he died.

== Sources ==
- Marx, Karl; Engels, Friedrich (1978). Karl Marx, Frederick Engels: Collected Works, Volume 9. International Publishers. ISBN 9780717805099.
