= Brodské =

- Municipality
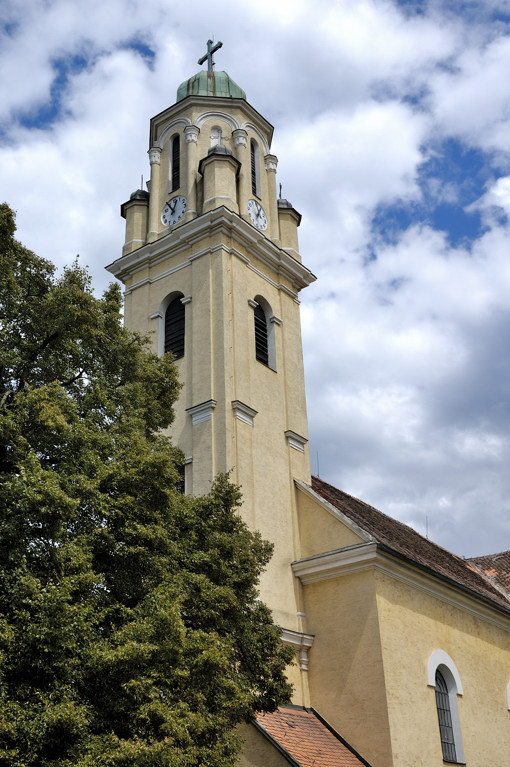

- Flag

- Location of Brodské in the Trnava Region Location of Brodské in Slovakia
- Coordinates: 48.69°N 17.01°E
- Country: Slovakia
- Region: Trnava Region
- District: Skalica District
- First mentioned: 1317

Area
  - Total: 20.36 km^{2} (7.86 sq mi)
- Elevation: 160 m (520 ft)

Population (2025)
  - Total: 2,244
- Time zone: UTC+1 (CET)
  - Summer (DST): UTC+2 (CEST)
- Postal code: 908 85
- Area code: +421 34
- Vehicle registration plate (until 2022): SI
- Website: brodske.sk

Brodské (Hungarian: Gázlós, until 1899 Broczkó) is a village and municipality in Skalica District in the Trnava Region of western Slovakia.

Brodské is a small village lying on the left side of the Morava river, which makes border with the Czech Republic and Austria. In historical records the village was first mentioned in 1163. The population of Brodské is around 2370 inhabitants (2006). In the middle of the village there is a Roman Catholic church devoted to St. Anton abbot, municipal hall and post office.

== Geography ==
The municipality lies at an altitude of 160 metres (520 ft) and covers an area of 20.36 km^{2} (7.86 sq mi) (2025).

== Population ==
Population statistic (10 years)
Year	1995	2005	2015	2025
Count	2392	2372	2329	2244
Difference		−0.83%	−1.81%	−3.64%

Population statistic
Year	2024	2025
Count	2248	2244
Difference		−0.17%

It has a population of 2244 people (31 December 2025).

=== Ethnicity ===
Census 2021 (1+ %)
Ethnicity	Number	Fraction
Slovak	2107	91.48%
Not found out	149	6.46%
Czech	90	3.9%
Total	2303	

In year 2021 was 2303 people by ethnicity 2107 as Slovak, 149 as Not found out, 90 as Czech, 16 as Romani, 10 as Russian, 7 as Other, 3 as Moravian, 3 as Hungarian, 2 as Italian, 2 as Austrian, 2 as Bulgarian and 1 as Polish.

Note on population: The difference values of population numbers in the table "Population statistic" and in the sections "Ethnicity" & "Religion" is caused by the use of various statistical methods.

=== Religion ===
Census 2021 (1+ %)
Religion	Number	Fraction
Roman Catholic Church	1655	71.86%
None	424	18.41%
Not found out	148	6.43%
Total	2303	

In year 2021 was 2303 people by religion 1655 from Roman Catholic Church, 424 from None, 148 from Not found out, 21 from Evangelical Church, 10 from Calvinist Church, 9 from Greek Catholic Church, 6 from Christian Congregations in Slovakia, 6 from Buddhism, 5 from Ad hoc movements, 4 from Other, 3 from Paganism and natural spirituality, 3 from Other and not ascertained christian church, 3 from Apostolic Church, 2 from Eastern Orthodox Church, 2 from Hinduism, 1 from Jewish community and 1 from Jehovah's Witnesses.

== Genealogical resources ==
The records for genealogical research are available at the state archive "Statny Archiv in Bratislava, Slovakia"

- Roman Catholic church records (births/marriages/deaths): 1653-1895 (parish A)
- Lutheran church records (births/marriages/deaths): 1786-1895 (parish B)

== See also ==
- List of municipalities and towns in Slovakia
