= Lajos Batthyány =

Hungarian politician (1807–1849)

Count Lajos Batthyány de Németújvár
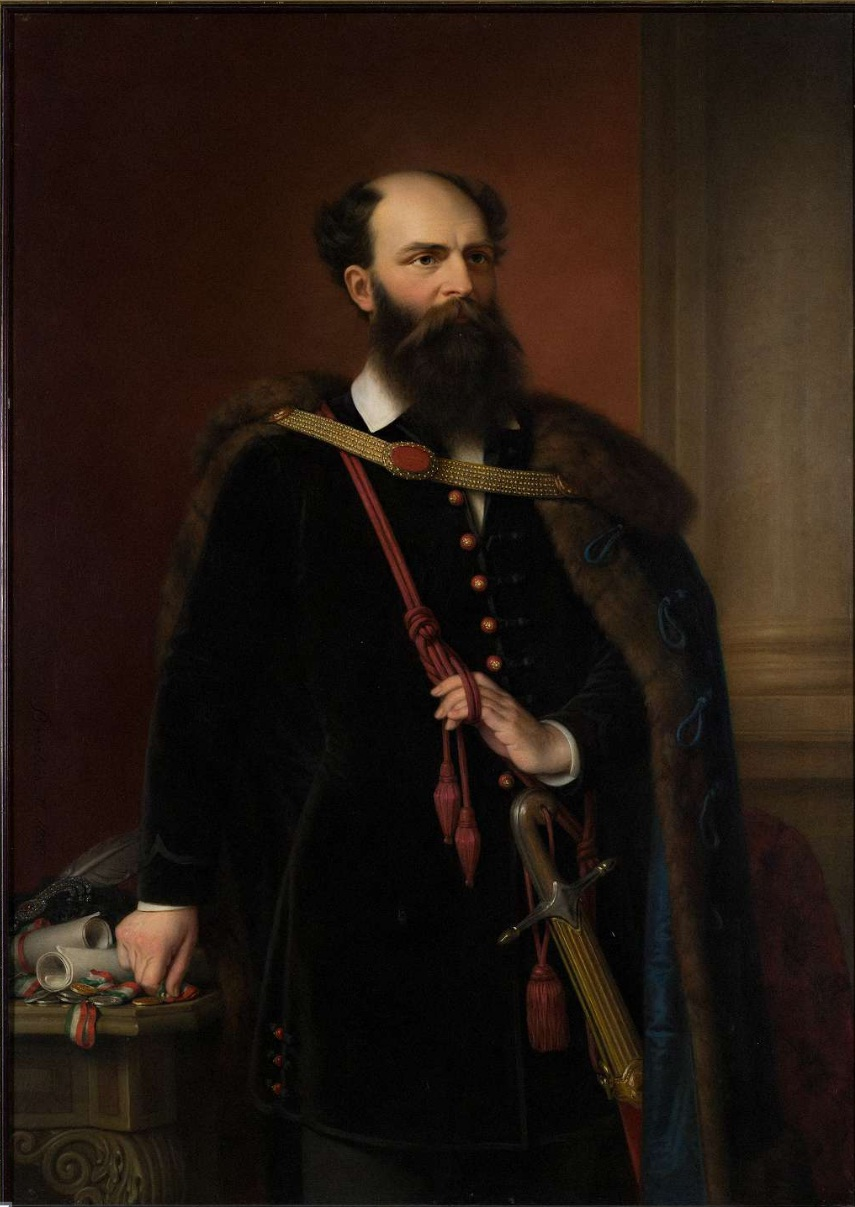
- Portrait by Miklós Barabás, 1840s

1st Prime Minister of the Kingdom of Hungary
- In office 17 March – 2 October 1848
- Monarch: Ferdinand V
- Deputy: Bertalan Szemere
- Preceded by: Position established
- Succeeded by: Lajos Kossuth

Leader of the Opposition Party
- In office 15 March 1847 – 2 September 1848
- Preceded by: Position established
- Succeeded by: Lajos Kossuth

Personal details
- Born: 10 February 1807 Pozsony, Kingdom of Hungary, Austrian Empire (present-day Bratislava, Slovakia)
- Died: 6 October 1849 (aged 42) Pest, Kingdom of Hungary, Austrian Empire (present-day Budapest, Hungary)
- Cause of death: Execution by firing squad
- Resting place: Kerepesi Cemetery, Budapest
- Party: Opposition Party
- Spouse: Antónia Zichy de Zics et Vázsonykő
- Children: Amália; Ilona; Elemér
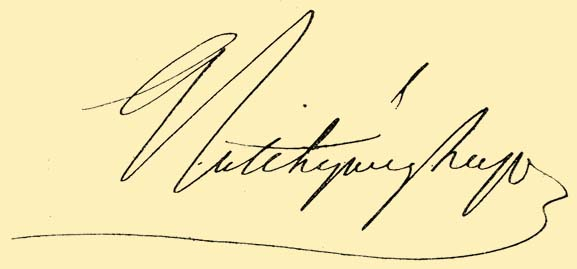
- Signature

Count Lajos Batthyány de Németújvár (Hungarian pronunciation: ['lɒjɔʃ 'bɒc:a:ɲi dɛ 'ne:mɛtu:jva:r]; Hungarian: gróf németújvári Batthyány Lajos; 10 February 1807 – 6 October 1849) was the first Prime Minister of Hungary. He was born in Pozsony (modern-day Bratislava) on 10 February 1807, and was executed by firing squad in Pest on 6 October 1849, the same day as the 13 Martyrs of Arad.

== Career ==
His father was Count József Sándor Batthyány von Német-Újvár (1777–1812), his mother Borbála Skerlecz de Lomnicza (1779–1834). He had an elder sister, Countess Amalia (who married, and divorced, Count Franz Oliver von Jenison-Walworth, and later then Count von Westerholt-Gysenberg. At an early age, he moved to Vienna with his mother and his brother after his parents' divorce. Batthyány had a private tutor, but his mother sent him to a boarding school and Batthyány rarely saw his mother again.

=== Early years ===
At the age of 16 Batthyány finished his studies at boarding school and attended the academy in Zagreb (now University of Zagreb, Croatia). In 1826 he took a tour of duty in Italy for four years, where he was promoted to lieutenant and got his law degree.

In 1830 he became a hereditary peer in the Upper House in Hungary and took his seat in the Parliament, but at this time Battyhány was not a politician by nature.

In December 1834 he married Countess Antónia Zichy de Zich et Vásonkeő (daughter of Count Károly Zichy de Zich et Vásonkeő and Countess Antónia Batthyány von Német-Újvár). Their children were: Countess Amália Batthyány von Német-Újvár (1837–1922), Ilona Keglevich von Buzin (1842–1929) and Count Elemér Batthyány (1847–1932). Batthyány's friend said that Antónia (his wife) encouraged him to take on larger responsibilities in politics.

=== Batthyány, the Reform politician ===
Batthyány became more involved after the 1839–1840 diet in Pozsony and was the Leader of the Opposition. He drew up a reform plan for them. Batthyány advised employing stenographers to record verbatim the proceedings of the Upper House starting in 1840.

Batthyány agreed with István Széchenyi's views on economics and politics. At the beginning of the 1830s Batthyány was one of the people who promoted the breeding of race horses in Hungary. Later they expanded into other animal breeding and established the Association of Hungarian Economy. Batthyány, following Széchenyi, supported breeding silkworms: he planted more than 50,000 mulberry trees on his farm to cultivate them. The Vas shire county and the Economics Association of Szombathely were founded with Batthyány's help.

At the start he agreed with Széchenyi that the new noblemen and aristocrats had to lead the new reform movement, but Batthyány's views were much closer to that of the nobility. Because of this Batthyány tried to bite his tongue when dealing with Széchenyi and Lajos Kossuth. From 1843 onward he started to work with Kossuth.

In the 1843–1844 parliament Batthyány was the Leader of the Opposition for the entire parliament, and criticised the Habsburg monarchy's internal affairs and foreign policy.

After the dissolution of parliament Batthyány moved to Pest and in 1845 he was elected as the chairman of the Central Election Office. He had an important role in the other economic associations and set up the Védegylet (roughly: "Defence society" ). On 15 March 1847 an amalgamation of the Hungarian Leftist movements (the Maverick Party) was founded and Batthyány became its first President.

Batthyány supported Kossuth both morally and financially. Kossuth became the representative for Pest County in the 1847 diet. After this Batthyány was the Leader of the Opposition in the Upper House while Kossuth had the same role in the Lower House.

=== The Batthyány Government ===
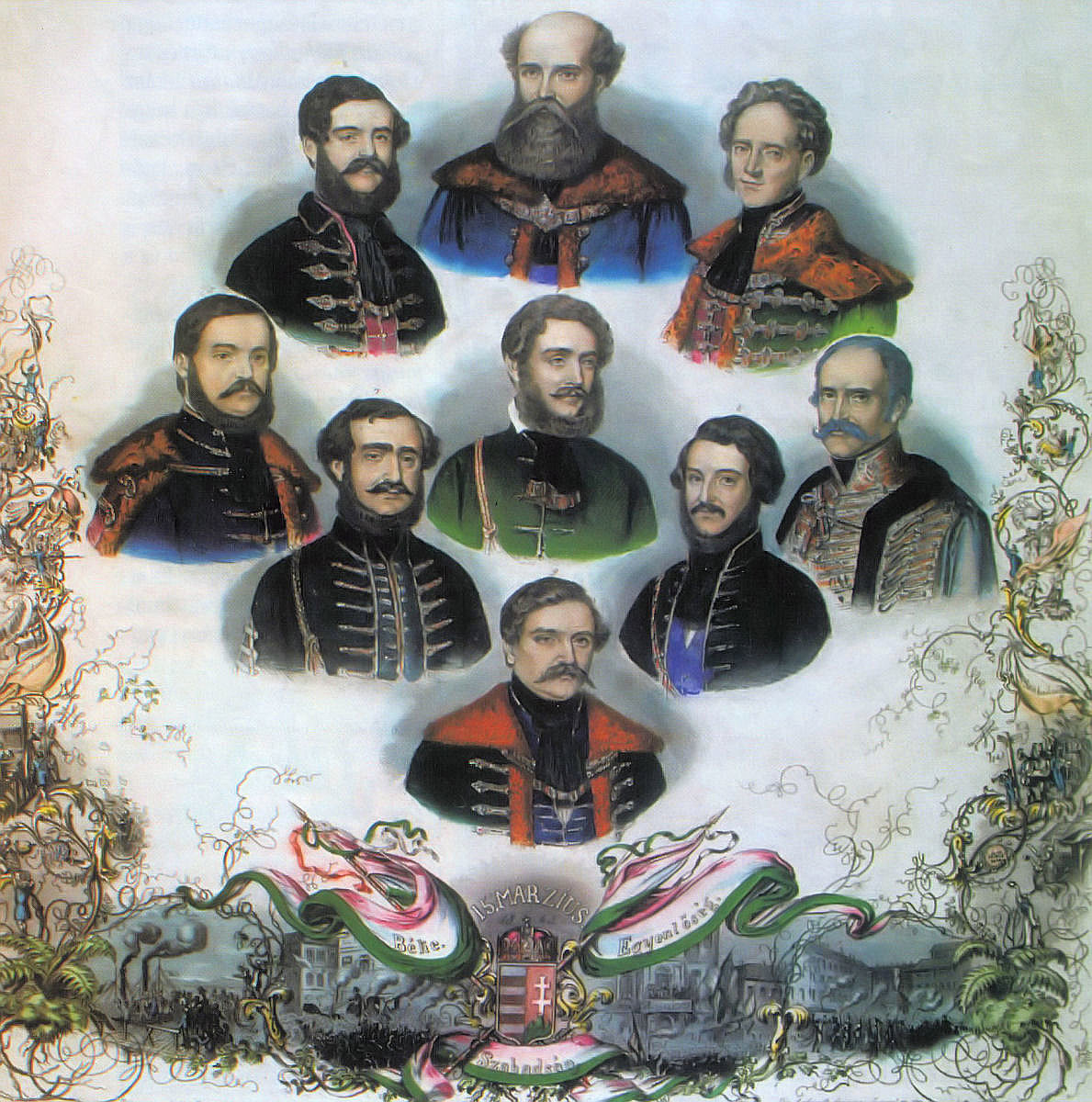
Batthyány's government painted by Henrik Weber

Batthyány was part of the delegation to the Emperor Ferdinand I of Austria. They insisted Hungary's government be supreme in its territory. On 17 March 1848 the Emperor assented and Batthyány created the first Diet of Hungary. On 23 March 1848, as head of government, Batthyány commended his administration to the Diet.

The first task of the new government was to work out the revolution's policies. After these were agreed, the government began to take action on 11 April 1848. At that time the internal affairs and foreign policy of Hungary were unstable, and Batthyány faced many problems. His first and most important act was to organise the armed forces and the local government. He insisted that the Austrian army, when in Hungary, would come under Hungarian law, and this was conceded by the Austrian Empire. He tried to repatriate conscripted soldiers to Hungary. He established the Organisation of Militiamen, whose job was to ensure internal security. In May 1848 he started to organise the independent Hungarian Revolutionary Army and recruited men into it. Batthyány took control of the Organisation of Militiamen until Lázár Mészáros returned. At the same time, he was Minister of War.

Batthyány was a very capable leader, but he was in the middle of a clash between the Austrian monarchy and the Hungarian separatists. He was devoted to the constitutional monarchy and aimed to uphold the constitution, but the Emperor was dissatisfied with his work. On 29 August, with the assent of parliament, Batthyány and Ferenc Deák went to the Emperor to ask him to order the Serbs to capitulate and to stop Josip Jelačić, who was planning to attack Hungary. At the same time, Batthyány made Jelačić the offer that Croatia – as part of the lands of the Hungarian Crown -, could separate from it peacefully. Batthyány's efforts were unsuccessful: even though the Emperor formally relieved Jelačić of his duties, in practice Jelačić and his army invaded Hungary on 11 September 1848.

So Batthyány and his government resigned, except for Kossuth, Szemere, and Mészáros. Later, at the request of Archduke Stephen, Palatine of Hungary, Batthyány became Prime Minister again. On 13 September Batthyány announced a rebellion and requested that the Palatine lead it. However the Palatine, under orders from the Emperor, resigned his position and left Hungary.

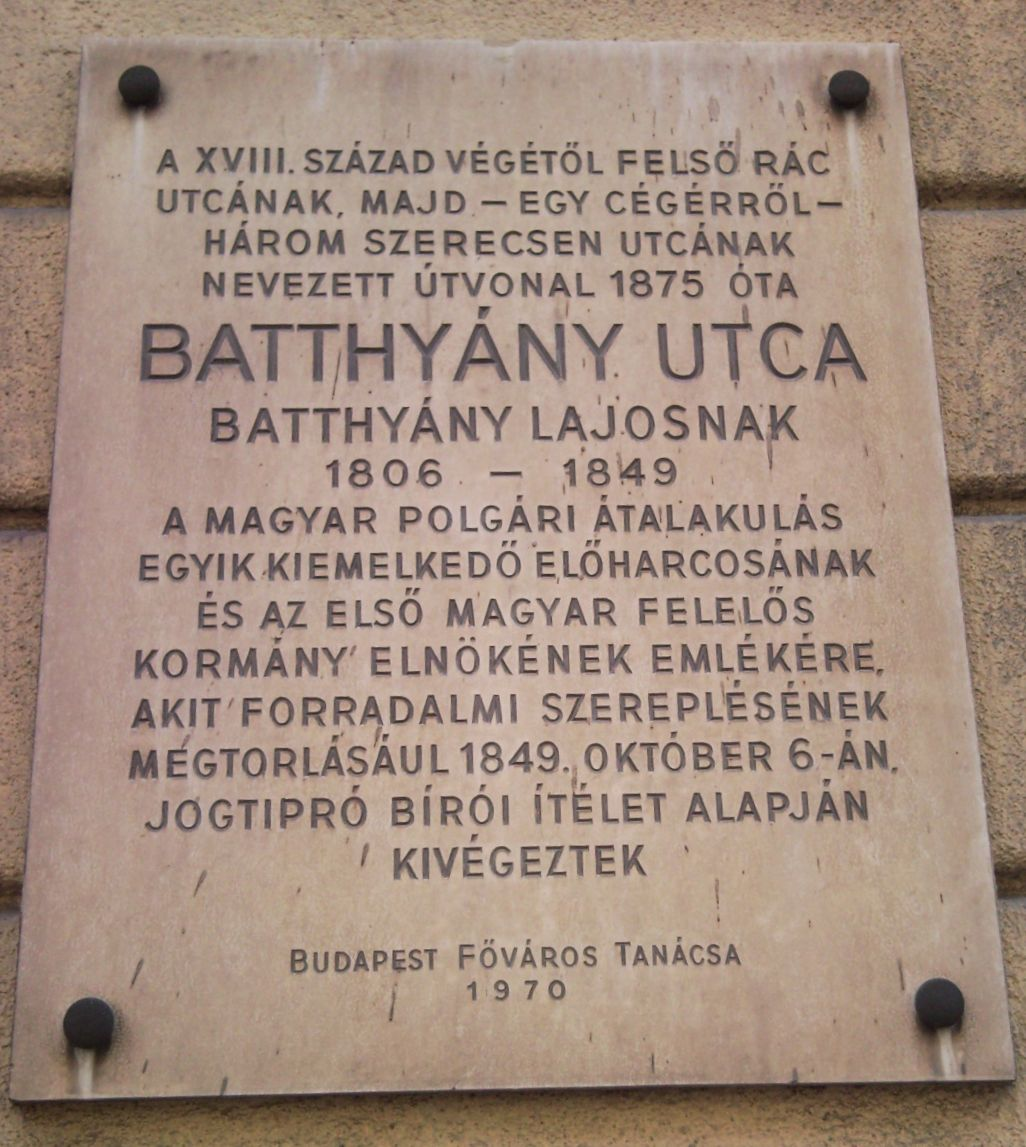
Plaque in Batthyány Street, Budapest, Hungary

The Emperor did not recognise the new government on 25 September. He also invalidated Batthyány's leadership and nominated Count Franz Philipp von Lamberg as the leader of the Hungarian army. But Lamberg was assassinated by the rebels in Pest on 28 September. Meanwhile, Batthyány travelled to Vienna again to seek a compromise with the Emperor.

Batthyány was successful in his hurried efforts to organize the Hungarian Revolutionary Army: the new army defeated the Croatians on 29 September at the Battle of Pákozd.

Batthyány realised that he could not compromise with the Emperor, so on 2 October he resigned again and nominated Miklós Vay as his successor. At the same time, Batthyány resigned his seat in parliament.

=== Resignation ===
As an ordinary soldier, Batthyány joined József Vidos' army, and fought against general Kuzman Todorović, but on 11 October 1848 he fell off his horse and broke his arm.

After Batthyány recovered he was again elected as a politician. Batthyány didn't want the Parliament to move to Debrecen. Because of his proposal the Parliament sent a delegation (including Batthyány himself) to General Alfred I, Prince of Windisch-Grätz to meet with him as the Parliament wanted to know Windisch-Grätz's purpose. But the general didn't want to meet with Batthyány, only with the other members of the delegation.

On 8 January 1849 Batthyány went back to Pest, where he was captured at the Károly Palace and imprisoned in the Budai barracks. When the Hungarian army was nearer Pest, Batthyány was taken away to Pozsony, Ljubljana and Olmütz (now Olomouc, Czech Republic). The Hungarians tried to rescue him many times, but Batthyány asked them not to. Batthyány insisted that his actions were legitimate and that the court had no jurisdiction.

== Execution ==
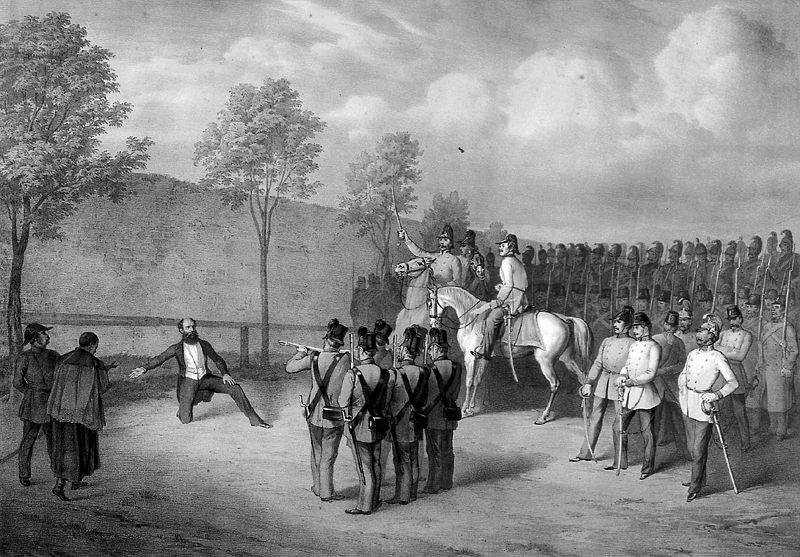
Batthyány's execution

On 16 August 1849 in Olmütz the Military Court sent Batthyány to his fate. At first they wanted to confiscate his possessions and give him a prison sentence, but under pressure from Prince Felix von Schwarzenberg and the Austrian Empire they instead sentenced Batthyány to death.

The Hungarians carried Batthyány to Pest, because they hoped that general Julius Jacob von Haynau (in the name of the Emperor) would give him mercy, but Haynau sentenced him to hang. In her last visit, Batthyány's wife smuggled a small sword into the prison. Batthyány tried to commit suicide by cutting his jugular veins, but he failed in the attempt. Because of the scars on his neck, the court changed the sentence to execution by firing squad.

On the evening of 6 October Batthyány was drugged and because of this he walked to the New Building. He had lost much blood because of his suicide attempt so that two people had to escort him. He was relieved to see that there were no gallows. Baron Johann Franz Kempen von Fichtenstamm, the commander of the military district in Pest and Buda knew that it was impossible to execute Batthyány by firing squad in his drugged state, but he sought no delay, so decided to shoot him in the head. Batthyány knelt in front of the firing squad and shouted: "Éljen a haza! Rajta, vadászok!" ("Long live my country! Come on, huntsmen!").

Batthyány's funeral was in the city centre, in the vault of the Greyfriars Church. After the Austro-Hungarian Compromise of 1867, in 1870 his remains were moved to the newly built mausoleum in the Kerepesi Cemetery.

== Works ==
Batthyány's parliamentary speeches are preserved in contemporary diaries and political newspapers. His essay on cultivating sugar beet was printed in the periodical Magyar Gazda in 1842.

== Monuments ==
- Batthyány's Mausoleum in the Kerepesi Cemetery (Budapest, Hungary), built by Albert Schickedanz at the request of the town of Székesfehérvár
- Batthyány's portrait by Miklós Barabás
- Batthyány Örökmécses (roughly, "monument") in Budapest
- Batthyány Square and Batthyány Street in Budapest. In 2008 a statue of Batthyány was erected on Batthyány Square.
- The Batthyány Lajos Trust (founded in 1991)
- The Batthyány Association's medallion issued in 1994, designed by László Szlávics, Jr.

== Ancestors ==
8. Count Zsigmond Batthyány de Németújvár
4. Count Miksa Batthyány de Németújvár
9. Rozália von Lengheim
2. Count József Sándor Batthyány de Németújvár
5. Magdolna Flässer
1. Count Lajos Batthyány de Németújvár
12. Sándor Skerlecz de Lomnicza
6. Ferencz Skerlecz de Lomnicza
13. Anna Rosty de Barkócz
3. Borbála Skerlecz de Lomnicza
14. Sándor Kis de Nemeskér
7. Rozália Kis de Nemeskér
15. Zsófia Daróczy de Királydarócz

== Gallery ==
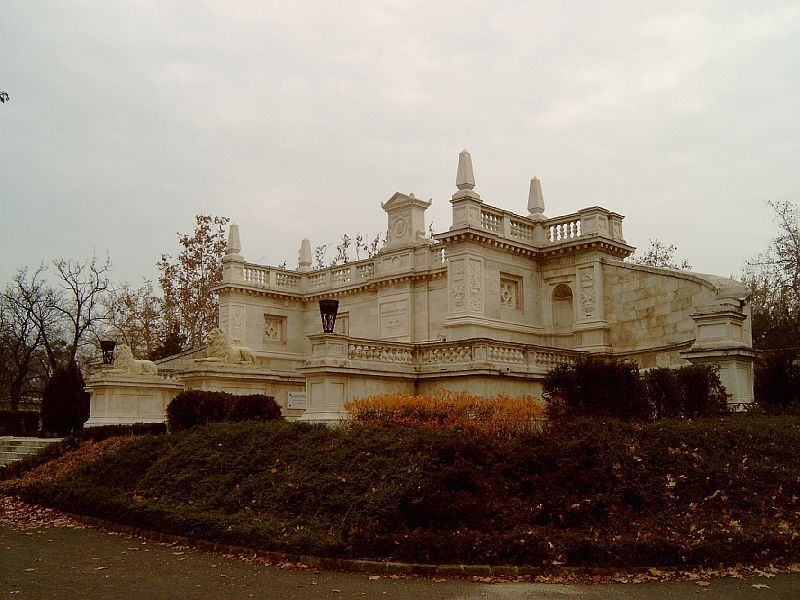
Batthyány's mausoleum in Kerepesi Cemetery, Budapest, Hungary

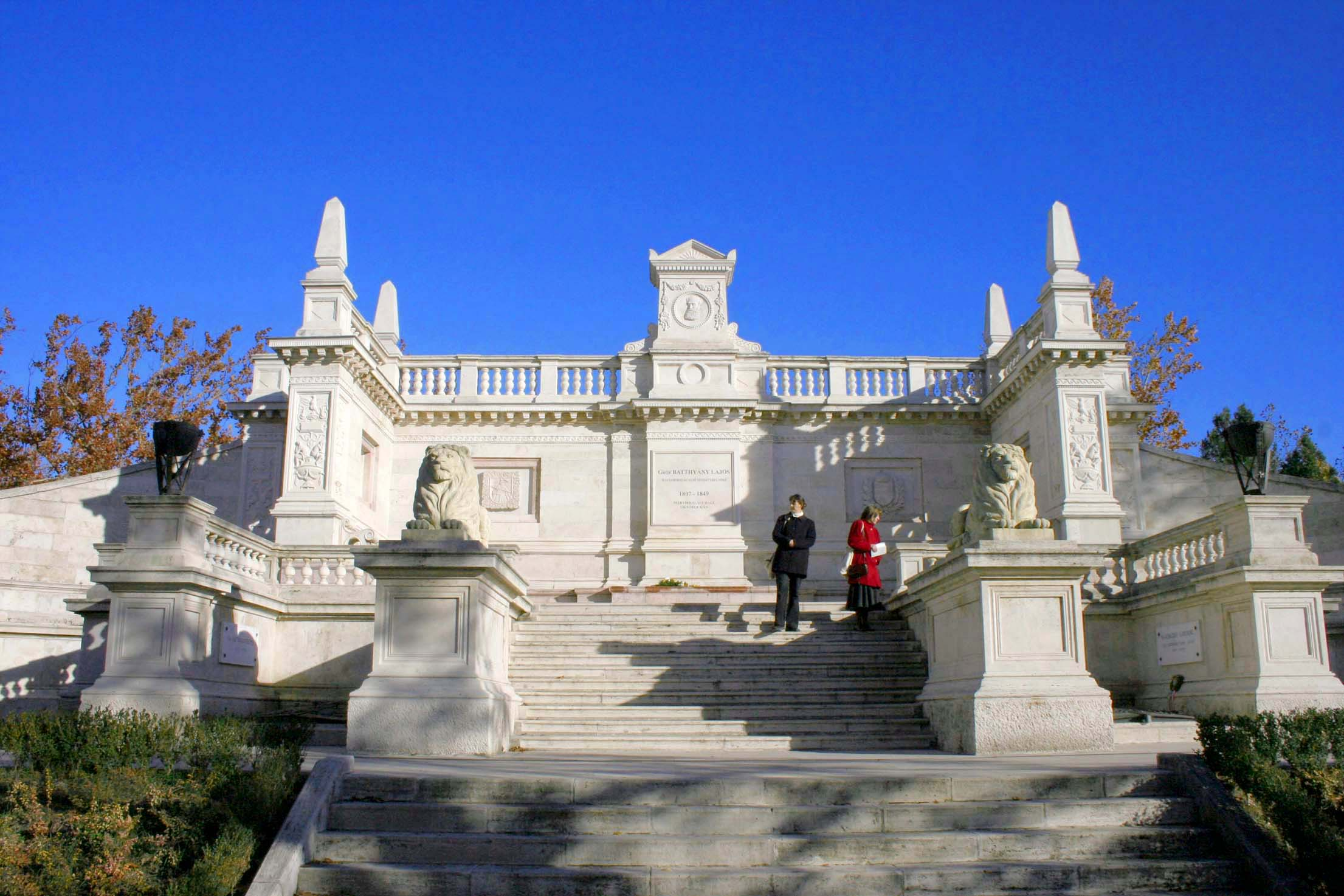
Batthyány's mausoleum after renovation

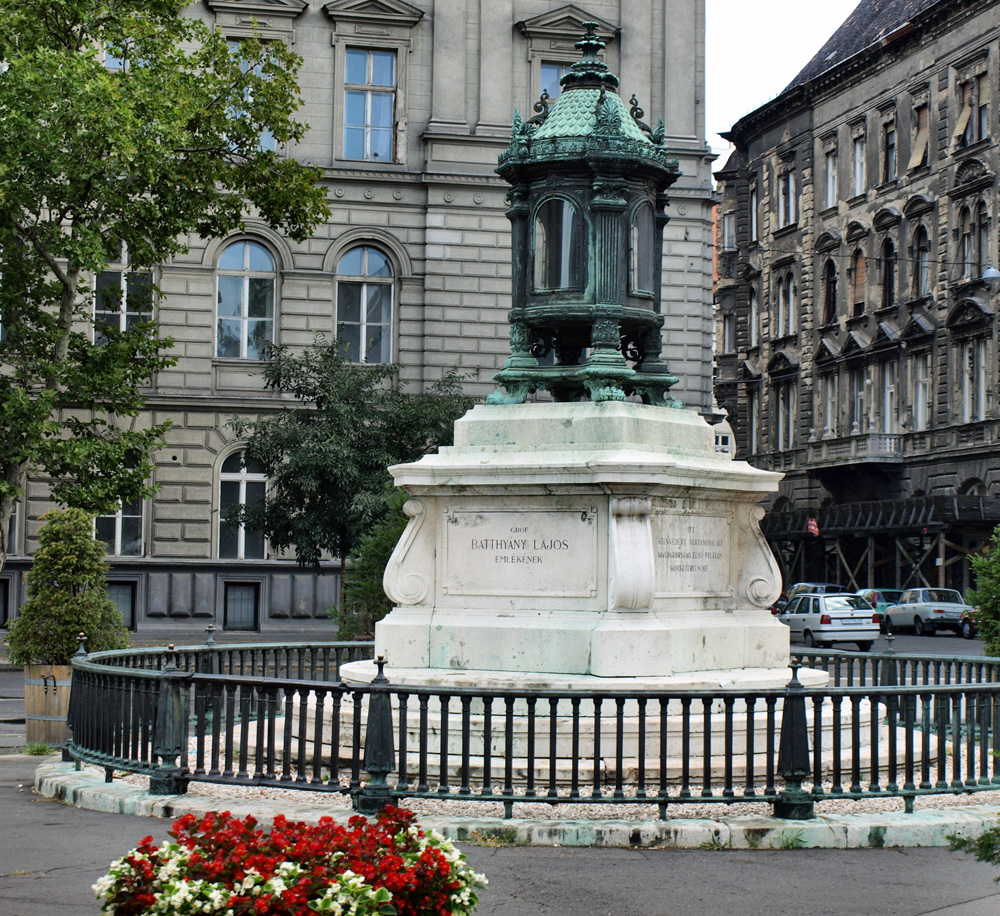
Batthyány's sanctuary lamp (monument)

== Sources ==
- József, Szinnyei (2000), Magyar írók élete és munkái [Hungarian writers' lives and works] (in Hungarian), Budapest: Arcanum, ISBN 963-86029-9-6
- András, Gergely (30 January 2007), Batthyány Lajós gróf [Count Batthyány Lajos] (in Hungarian), Budapest: Balassi Bálint Magyar Kulturális Intézet Nemzeti Évfordulók Titkársága (Bálint Balassi Hungarian Cultural Institution, Secretariat of National Anniversaries), pp. 5–9, ISBN 978-963-87210-5-1
- Magyar Nagylexokon 3 [Hungarian cyclopaedia] (in Hungarian), Budapest: Akadémia, 1994, pp. 376–377, ISBN 963-05-6821-7

Political offices
Preceded by Archduke Stephen as Palatine of Hungary	Prime Minister of Hungary; 1848	Succeeded by Bertalan Szemere
Preceded by office created	Minister of War; Acting; 1848	Succeeded by Lázár Mészáros
Preceded by Lajos Kossuth	Minister of Finance; Acting; 1848	Succeeded by Ferenc Duschek
Preceded by József Eötvös	Minister of Religion and Education; Acting; 1848	Succeeded by Mihály Horváth
