= Șieu-Odorhei =

- Commune
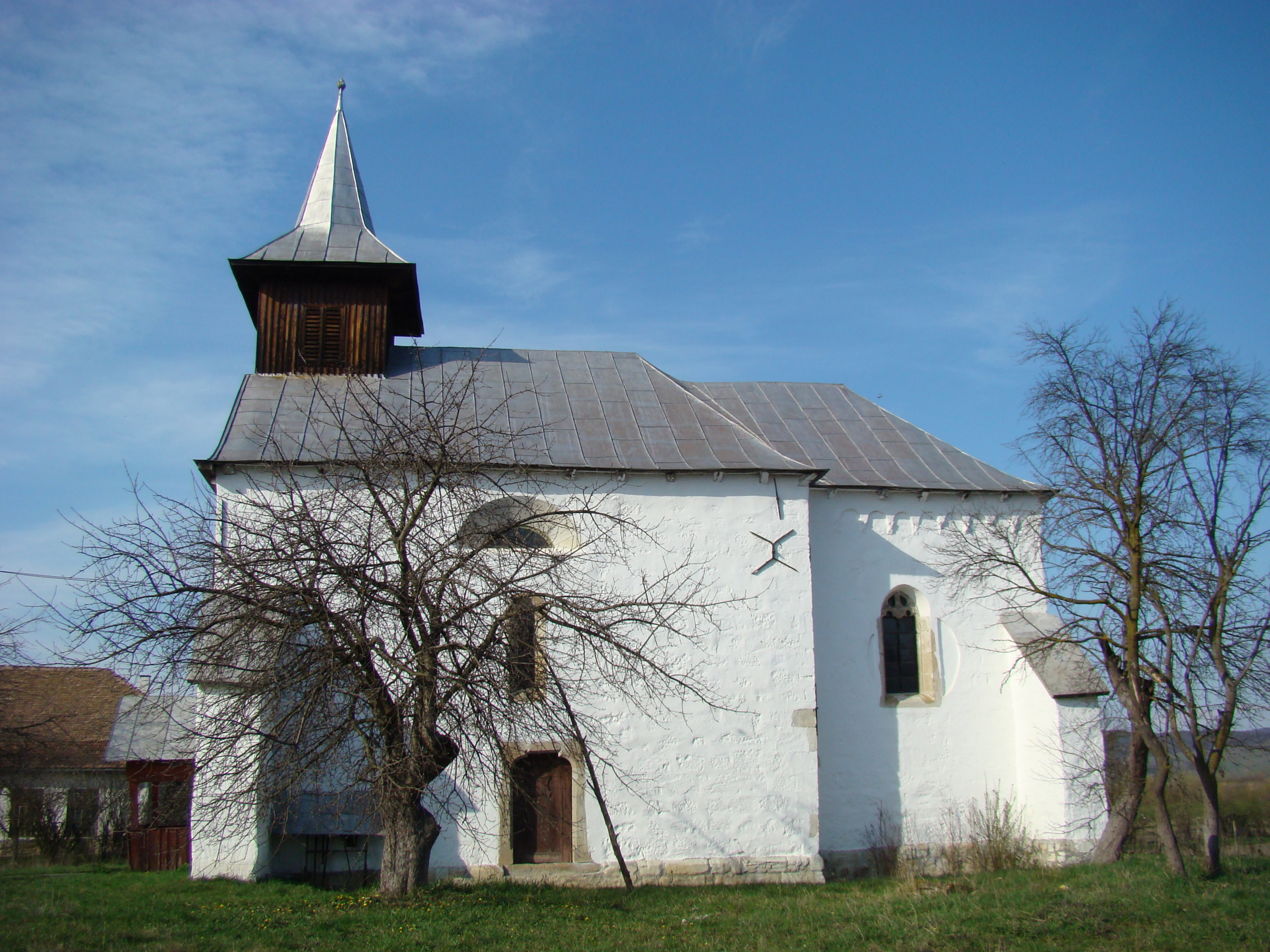
- Reformed church in Șieu-Odorhei village

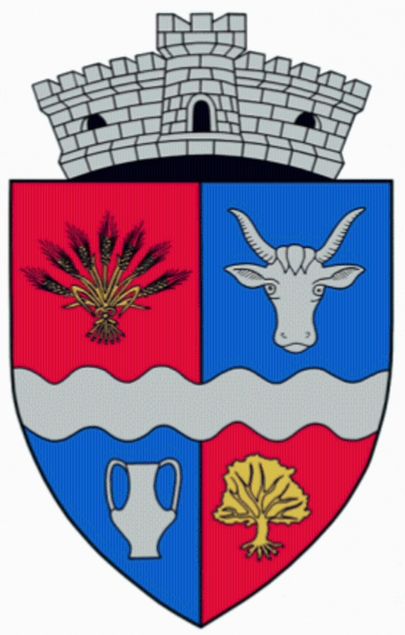
- Coat of arms

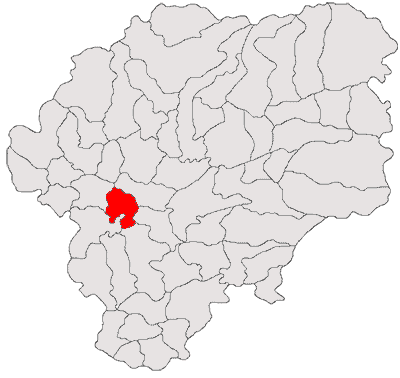
- Location in Bistrița-Năsăud County

- Location in Romania
- Coordinates: 47°9′N 24°19′E
- Country: Romania
- County: Bistrița-Năsăud

Government
  - Mayor (2020–2024): Sorin-Ioan Sfintean (PSD)
- Area: 51.16 km^{2} (19.75 sq mi)
- Elevation: 280 m (920 ft)
- Population (2021-12-01): 2,219
  - Density: 43.37/km^{2} (112.3/sq mi)
- Time zone: UTC+02:00 (EET)
  - Summer (DST): UTC+03:00 (EEST)
- Postal code: 427365
- Vehicle reg.: BN

Șieu-Odorhei (German: Dienesdorf; Hungarian: Sajóudvarhely) is a commune in Bistrița-Năsăud County, Transylvania, Romania. It is composed of seven villages: Agrișu de Jos (Alsóegres), Agrișu de Sus (Felsőegres), Bretea (Breit; Magyarberéte), Coasta (Sajókiskeresztúr), Cristur-Șieu (Oberkreuz; Bethlenkeresztúr), Șieu-Odorhei, and Șirioara (Sajósárvár).

The commune is situated on the Transylvanian Plateau, at an altitude of 280 m (920 ft), on the banks of the Șieu River. It is located in the west-central part of Bistrița-Năsăud County, 12 km (7.5 mi) east of the town of Beclean and 26 km (16 mi) west of the county seat, Bistrița.

Historical population
Year	Pop.	±%
2002	2,556	—
2011	2,262	−11.5%
2021	2,219	−1.9%
Source: Census data

At the 2011 census, there were 2,262 inhabitants, of which 91.1% were Romanians and 8.3% Hungarians. At the 2021 census, Șieu-Odorhei had a population of 2,219; of those, 88.2% were Romanians and 4.8% Hungarians.
