= Galații Bistriței =

- Commune
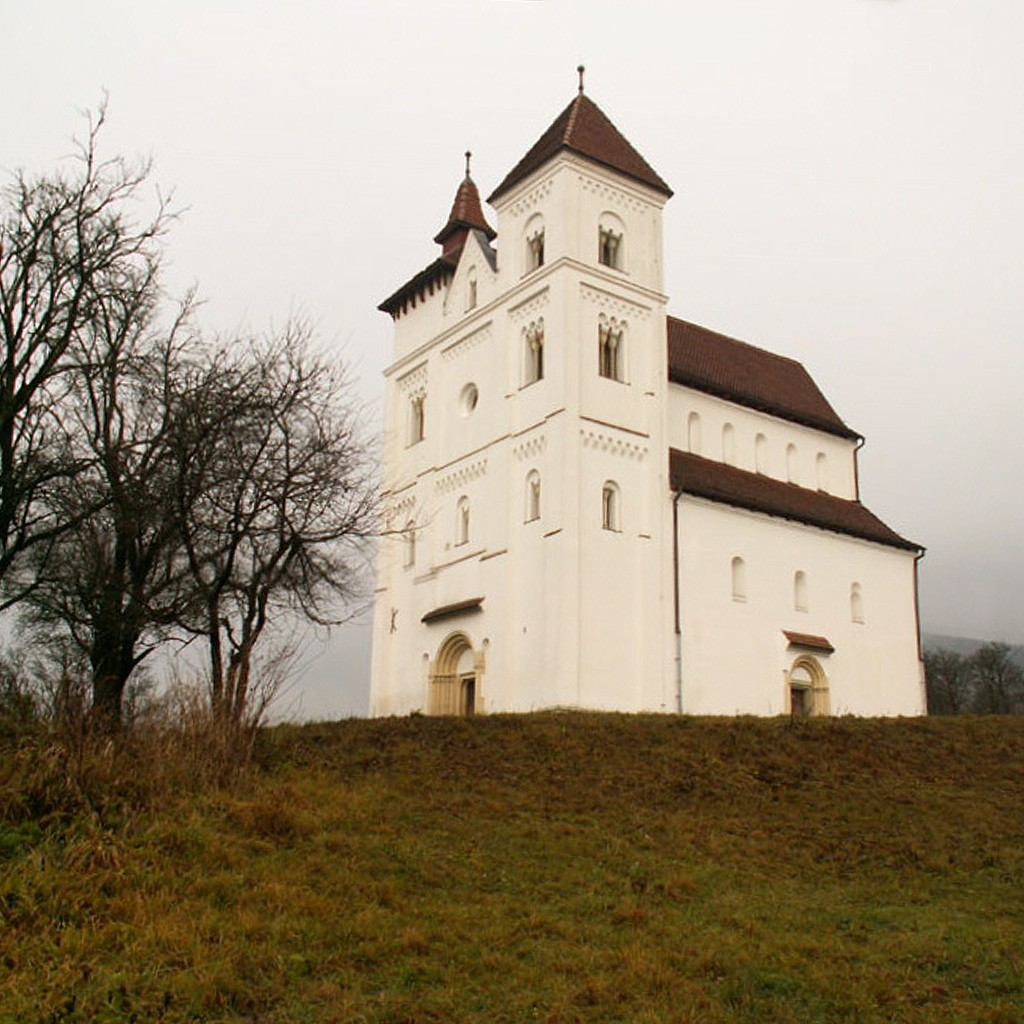
- Romanesque Lutheran church in Herina village, formerly part of a Benedictine abbey

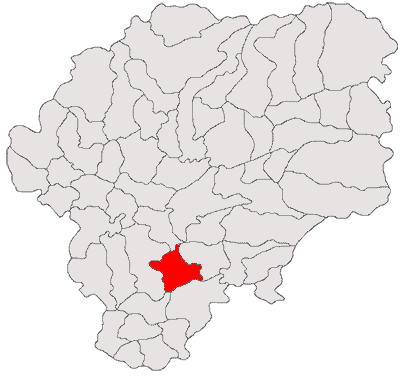
- Location in Bistrița-Năsăud County

- Location in Romania
- Coordinates: 46°59′N 24°24′E
- Country: Romania
- County: Bistrița-Năsăud

Government
  - Mayor (2020–2024): Vasile-Mihai Vermeșan (PSD)
- Area: 71.26 km^{2} (27.51 sq mi)
- Elevation: 324 m (1,063 ft)
- Population (2021-12-01): 2,257
  - Density: 31.67/km^{2} (82.03/sq mi)
- Time zone: UTC+02:00 (EET)
  - Summer (DST): UTC+03:00 (EEST)
- Postal code: 427085
- Area code: +(40) x59
- Vehicle reg.: BN
- Website: www.galatiibistritei.ro

Galații Bistriței (Hungarian: Galacfalva, formerly Galac; German: Heresdorf or Gallatz Bistritz; Transylvanian Saxon: Heresdref or Hieresdref) is a commune in Bistrița-Năsăud County, Transylvania, Romania.

It is composed of five villages: Albeștii Bistriței (formerly Ferihaza; Hungarian: Fehéregyház or Kisfehéregyház; German: Weisskirchen or Weisskirch-Bistritz), Dipșa (Hungarian: Dipse, German: Dürrbach), Galații Bistriței, Herina (formerly Hirina; Hungarian: Harina; German: Münzdorf or Mönchsdorf), and Tonciu (Hungarian: Tacs; German: Tatsch or Totsch).

At the 2011 census, 80.4% of inhabitants were Romanians, 9.3% Hungarians, and 8.7% Roma. At the 2021 census, Galații Bistriței had a population of 2,257; of those, 79.62% were Romanians, 7.04% Roma, and 6.47% Hungarians.

Dipșa village features a church originally completed in 1489. It was founded by Transylvanian Saxons as a Catholic and later Lutheran church, and is now Romanian Orthodox, dedicated to Saint Demetrius of Thessaloniki. It is known as the “sow’s church” because, according to legend, a sow discovered a bucket full of gold coins that were used to build the church.
