= Lechința =

- Commune
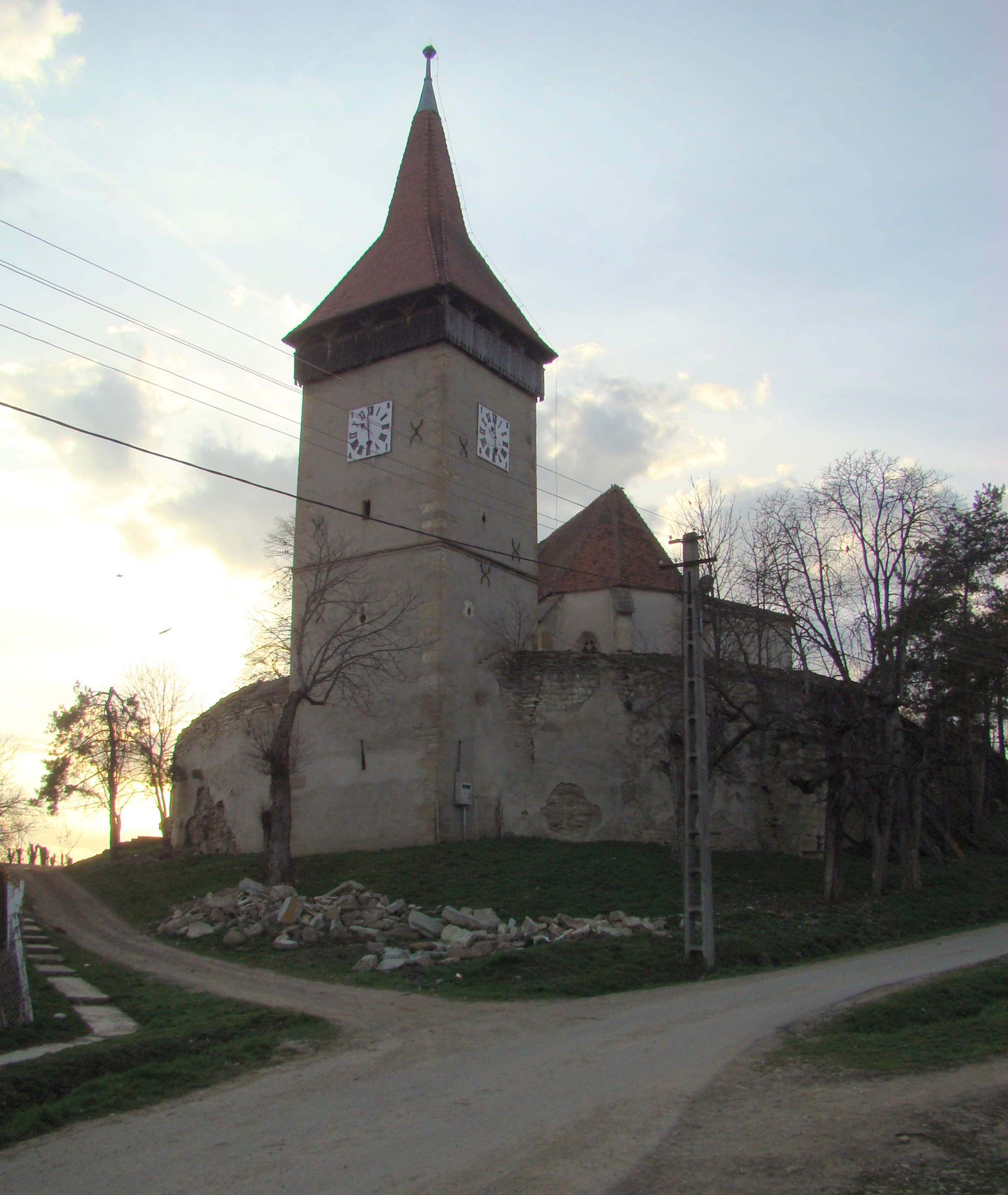
- Lutheran church in Lechința village

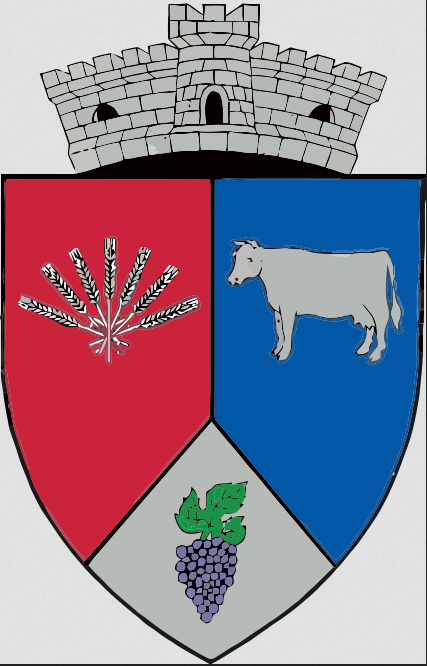
- Coat of arms

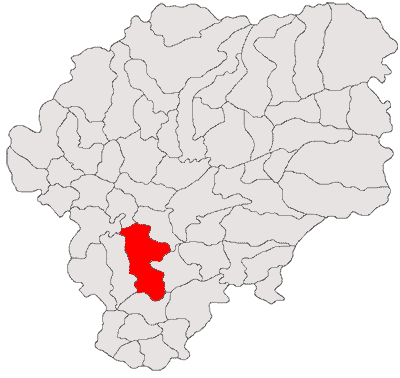
- Location in Bistrița-Năsăud County

- Location in Romania
- Coordinates: 47.0194°N 24.3336°E
- Country: Romania
- County: Bistrița-Năsăud

Government
  - Mayor (2020–2024): Romeo-Daniel Florian (PSD)
- Area: 133.26 km^{2} (51.45 sq mi)
- Elevation: 306 m (1,004 ft)
- Population (2021-12-01): 5,469
  - Density: 41.04/km^{2} (106.3/sq mi)
- Time zone: UTC+02:00 (EET)
  - Summer (DST): UTC+03:00 (EEST)
- Postal code: 427105
- Area code: +(40) x263
- Vehicle reg.: BN
- Website: www.primarialechinta.ro

Lechința (German: Lechnitz; Hungarian: Szászlekence) is a commune in Bistrița-Năsăud County, Transylvania, Romania. It is composed of seven villages: Bungard (Baumgarten bei Bistritz; Szászbongárd), Chiraleș (Kyrieleis; Kerlés), Lechința, Sângeorzu Nou (Sankt Georgen; Szászszentgyörgy), Sâniacob (Jakobsdorf bei Bistritz; Szászszentjakab), Țigău (Zagendorf; Cegőtelke), and Vermeș (Wermesch; Vermes);

== Geography ==
The commune is situated on the Transylvanian Plateau, in the Nösnerland, a historic region of northeastern Transylvania. It lies on the banks of the Lechința River.

Lechința is located in the southern part of Bistrița-Năsăud County, 24 km (15 mi) from the county seat, Bistrița and 29 km (18 mi) from Beclean. It is crossed by county roads DJ151 and DJ172E.

== History ==
The Battle of Kerlés occurred in Chiraleș village in 1068; an army of Pechenegs and Ouzes commanded by Osul was defeated by the troops of King Solomon of Hungary and his cousins, Dukes Géza and Ladislaus.

== Demographics ==
At the 2011 census, the commune had 5,678 inhabitants, 72% of which were Romanians, 19.2% Roma, 8.4% Hungarians, and 0.2% Germans. At the 2021 census, Lechința had a population of 5,469, of which 64.47% were Romanians, 20.24% Roma, and 6.73% Hungarians.

== Notable residents ==
- Ionuț Hlinca (born 1988), Romanian footballer
- George Mantello (1901–1992), Jewish businessman who saved thousands of Jews from the Holocaust while working as a diplomat for El Salvador

== Economy ==
The Lechința Solar Park is located in Lechința village.

The Lechința wine region is one the northernmost such regions on the Transylvanian Plateau; it comprises wineries located in Lechința, Teaca, Bistrița, and Batoș.
