= Șintereag =

- Commune
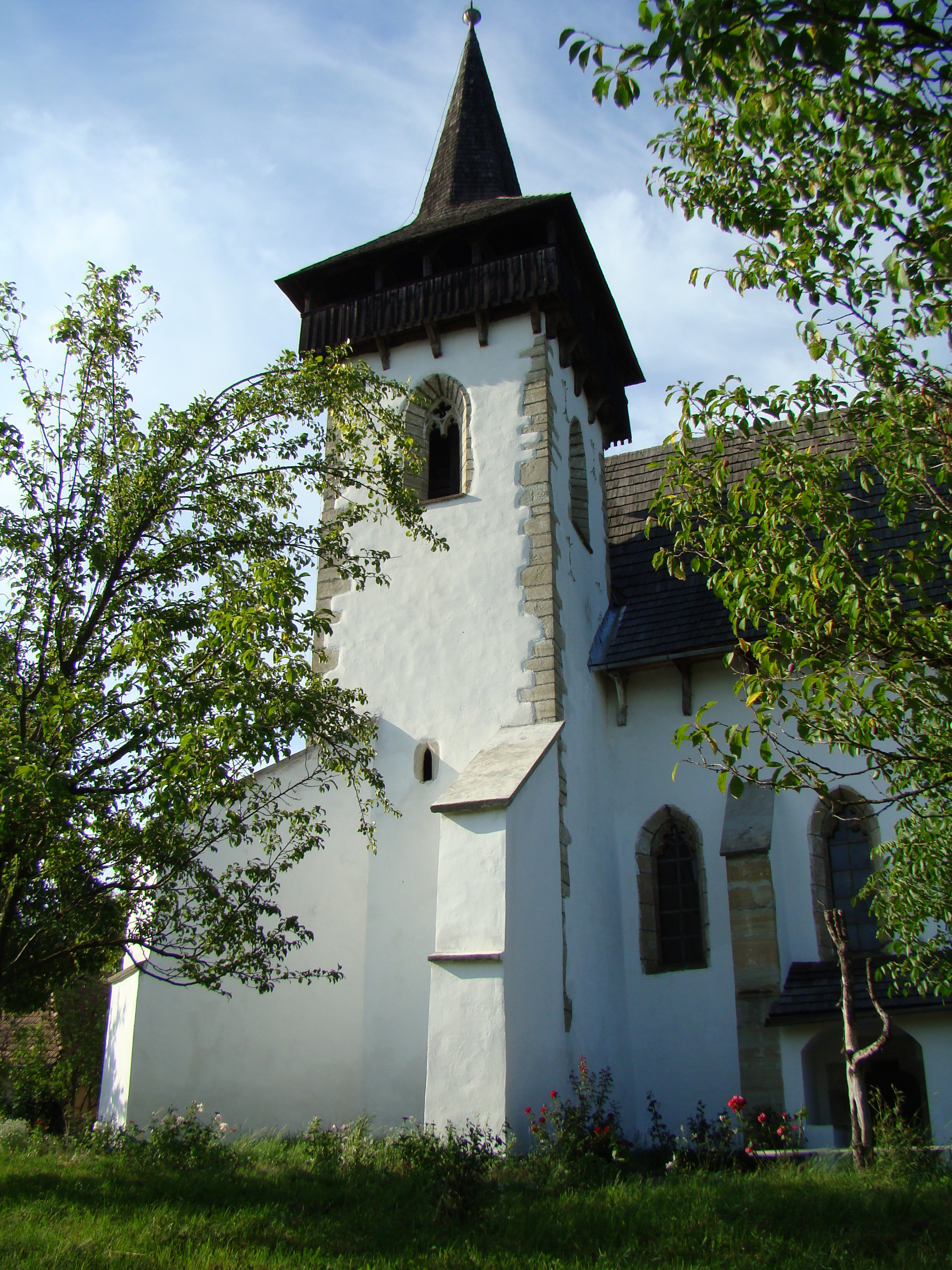
- Reformed Calvinist church in Șintereag village

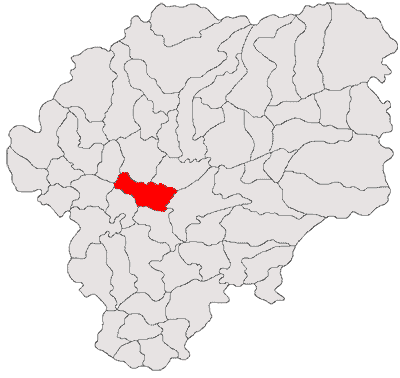
- Location in Bistrița-Năsăud County

- Location in Romania
- Coordinates: 47°11′N 24°18′E
- Country: Romania
- County: Bistrița-Năsăud

Government
  - Mayor (2020–2024): Ioan Bob (PSD)
- Area: 70.82 km^{2} (27.34 sq mi)
- Elevation: 274 m (899 ft)
- Population (2021-12-01): 3,737
  - Density: 52.77/km^{2} (136.7/sq mi)
- Time zone: UTC+02:00 (EET)
  - Summer (DST): UTC+03:00 (EEST)
- Postal code: 427320
- Vehicle reg.: BN
- Website: www.primariasintereag.ro

Șintereag (Hungarian: Somkerék; German: Simkragen or Sebenkragen; Transylvanian Saxon: Simkroang) is a commune in Bistrița-Năsăud County, Transylvania, Romania.

It is composed of seven villages: Blăjenii de Jos (Alsóbalázsfalva; German: Unterblasendorf; Transylvanian Saxon: Nedersst-Bluesendref), Blăjenii de Sus (Felsőbalázsfalva; German: Oberblasendorf; Transylvanian Saxon: Ewerst-Bluesendref), Caila (Kajla; German: Köllendorf; Transylvanian Saxon: Keldref), Cociu (Szamoskócs), Șieu-Sfântu (Sajószentandrás; German: Leresdorf; Transylvanian Saxon: Leresderf), Șintereag and Șintereag-Gară (Somkeréki állomás).

== Natives ==
- Grigore Bălan (1896–1944), Brigadier General during World War II
- Nicolae Bălan (1882–1955), metropolitan bishop of the Romanian Orthodox Church
