= Șieu (river) =

- Location within Romania

Location
- Country: Romania
- Counties: Bistrița-Năsăud County

Physical characteristics
- Source: Călimani Mountains
- Mouth: Someșul Mare
  - location: near Beclean
  - coordinates: 47°11′44″N 24°12′57″E
- Length: 71 km (44 mi)
- Basin size: 1,818 km^{2} (702 sq mi)
- Discharge
  - location: Șintereag
  - average: 13.4 m^{3}/s (470 cu ft/s)

Basin features
- Progression: Someșul Mare→ Someș→ Tisza→ Danube→ Black Sea
- Tributaries
  - left: Dipșa
  - right: Bistrița, Rosua

The Șieu (Hungarian: Sajó) is a left tributary of the river Someșul Mare in Romania. Its main branch, the Sebiș, originates in the Călimani Mountains, near the Poiana Tomii Peak (1,470 m (4,820 ft)); it discharges into the Someșul Mare near Beclean. Its length is 71 km (44 mi) and its basin size is 1,818 km^{2} (702 sq mi).

== Towns and villages ==
The following towns and villages are situated along the river Șieu, from source to mouth: Șieuț, Șieu, Mărișelu, Șieu-Măgheruș, Șieu-Odorhei, Șintereag.

== Tributaries ==
The following rivers are tributaries to the river Șieu:

Left: Dipșa, Bretea, Agriș

Right: Șieuț, Ardan, Măgura, Budac & Budăcelul, Bistrița, Măgheruș, Rosua
