= Teaca =

- Commune
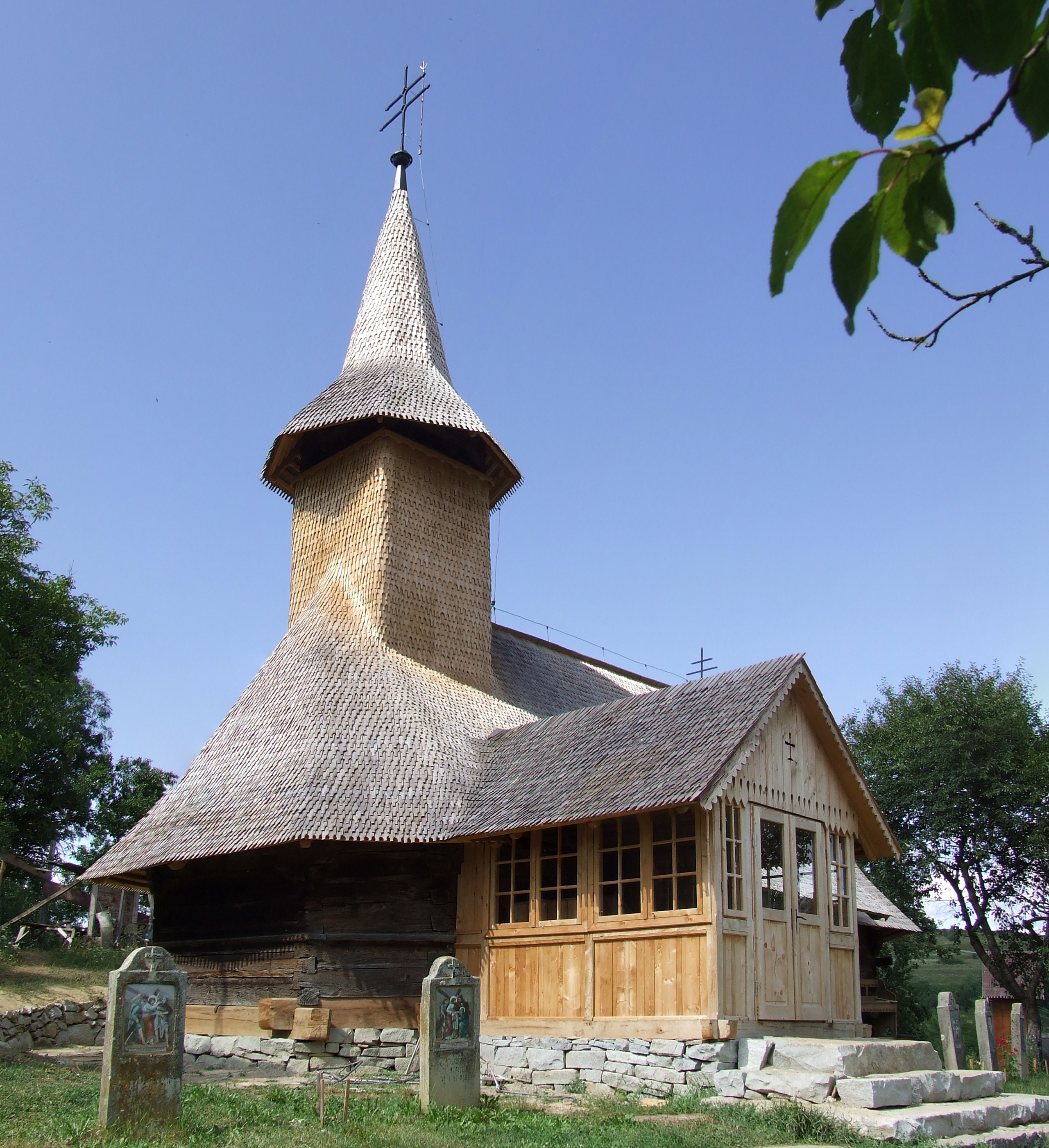
- Wooden church in Budurleni

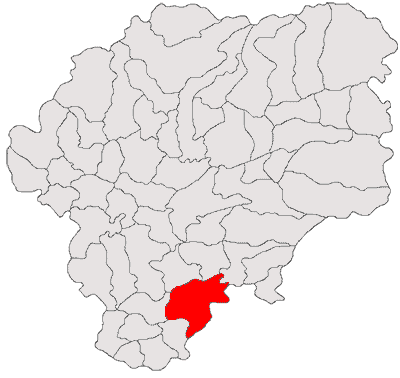
- Location in Bistrița-Năsăud County

- Location in Romania
- Coordinates: 46°55′N 24°31′E
- Country: Romania
- County: Bistrița-Năsăud

Government
  - Mayor (2020–2024): Damian-Iustian Muntean (PSD)
- Area: 140.80 km^{2} (54.36 sq mi)
- Elevation: 349 m (1,145 ft)
- Population (2021-12-01): 4,991
  - Density: 35.45/km^{2} (91.81/sq mi)
- Time zone: UTC+02:00 (EET)
  - Summer (DST): UTC+03:00 (EEST)
- Postal code: 427345
- Area code: +(40) x59
- Vehicle reg.: BN

Teaca (Hungarian: Teke; German: Tekendorf or Teckendorf) is a commune in Bistrița-Năsăud County, Transylvania, Romania.

It is composed of six villages: Archiud (Hungarian: Mezőerked, Szászerked, Erked; German: Arkeden bei Bistriz, Arkeden, Erkeden), Budurleni (Hungarian: Budurló, formerly Budurlău), Ocnița (formerly Ocna; Hungarian: Mezőakna, Szászakna; German: Salzgruben, Grubendorf), Pinticu (formerly Pintic; Hungarian: Szászpéntek, Alsópéntek, Péntek; German: Pintak, Pintak am Graben), Teaca, and Viile Tecii (formerly Ida Mare, Iuda, Iuda Mare; Hungarian: Kolozsnagyida, Nagyida, Ida; German: Großeidau, Grosseidau, Eyda).

The commune is situated on the Transylvanian Plateau, in the Nösnerland, a historic region of northeastern Transylvania. Teaca lies at an altitude of 349 m (1,145 ft), on the banks of the river Dipșa and its right tributary, the river Pintic. It is located in the southern part of Bistrița-Năsăud County, 32 km (20 mi) from the county seat, Bistrița, on the border with Mureș County.

Teaca is crossed by national road DN15A (part of European route E578), which joins Reghin (28 km (17 mi) to the southeast, in Mureș County) to Bistrița.

At the 2021 census, Teaca had a population of 4,991; of those, 60.25% were Romanians, 26.21% Roma, and 5.95% Hungarians.
