= Battle of Perlasz =

First battle of the Hungarian War of Independence 1848

- Part of the Hungarian Revolution of 1848
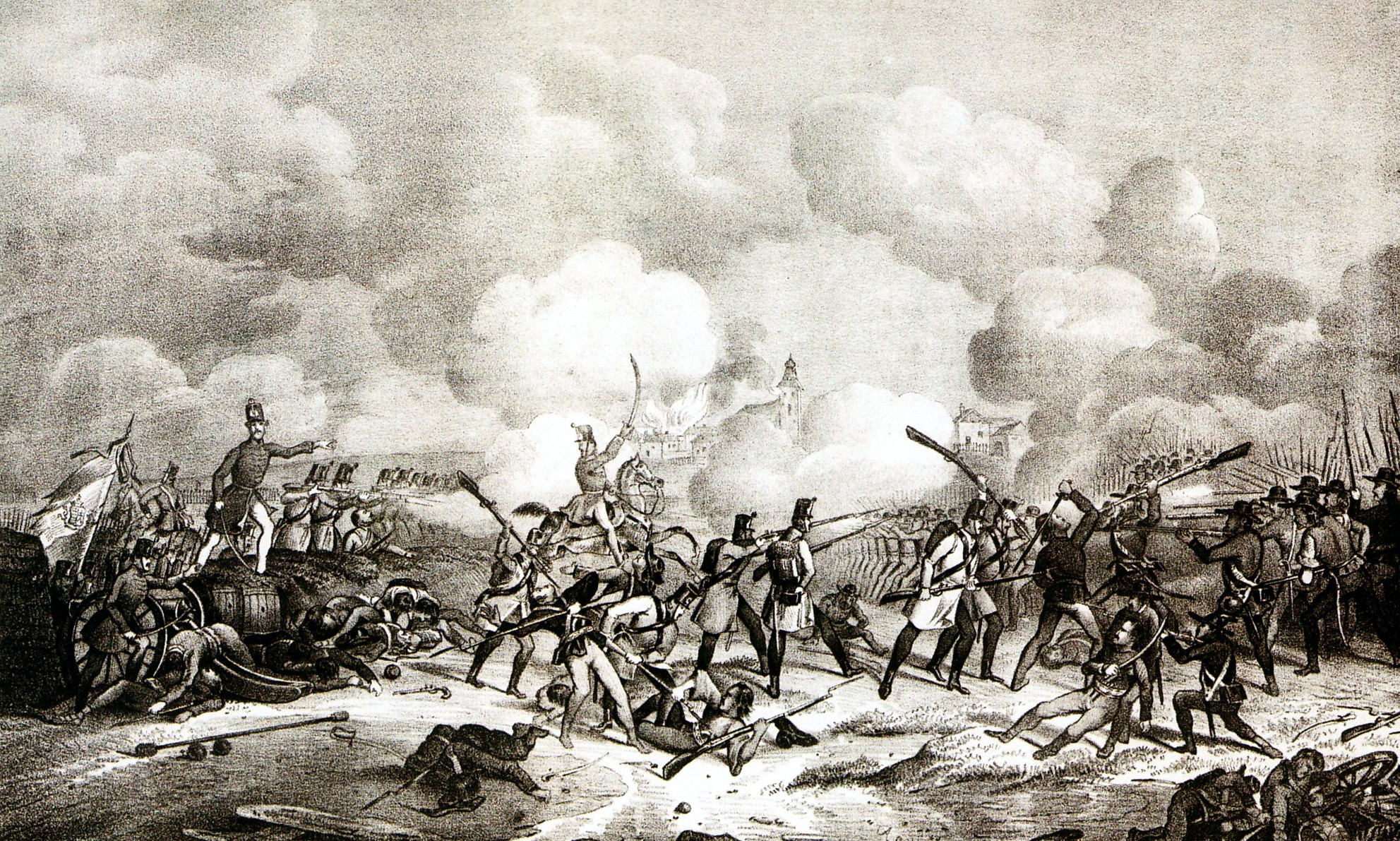
- Battle of Perlasz
Date	2 September 1848
Location	Perlasz, Torontál County, Bánság, Kingdom of Hungary (today Serbia) 45°12′51″N 20°22′50″E
Result	Hungarian victory

Belligerents
Hungarian Revolutionary Army	Austrian Empire: Serbian Vojvodina

Commanders and leaders
Ernő Kiss; Antal Vetter	Jovan Drakulić

Strength
~ 2,500 men 20 cannons	~ 5,000; 12 cannons

Casualties and losses
14 men dead 69 men wounded 15 horses dead 6 horses wounded	260–450 men dead 400 men wounded 10 cannons

The Battle of Perlasz (now Perlez, in the Zrenjanin municipality in the Central Banat District Serbia) was a battle in the Hungarian War of Independence of 1848-1849, fought on 2 September 1848 between the Hungarian Army under the command of Colonel Ernő Kiss and Lieutenant Colonel Antal Vetter against the Serbian insurgents led by Colonel Jovan Drakulić. The Hungarians captured, through heavy fight, the Serbian fortified military camp from Perlasz, being the first important offensive success of the Hungarian army in the Revolutionary war. Although this success could not be exploited because of Kiss's indecision, it had an important moral boost for the Hungarians, and also prevented the Serbians to start an offensive right when the Croatian troops led by Ban Josip Jelačić attacked Hungary, to put an end to the Hungarian independence.

== Background ==
At the beginning of July, the Serb fortified camps numbered 29–30,000 armed men, with at least 100 guns, mostly small caliber (3-6-pounders). The Serbs had no cavalry, so they struck at the Hungarian, Romanian and German settlements in the area on fast-moving wagons. On 26 June, a bloody clash took place between the Hungarian population and the Serbian National Guard supported by Serbian volunteers coming from the Principality of Serbia to help the anti-Hungarian insurgence) at the election of the deputies in Újvidék (Novi Sad).

As soon as the Hungarian government learned about the escalating situation in Southern Hungary, it decided to introduce more serious security measures. On 11 June, the Minister of the Interior, Bertalan Szemere, informed the threatened counties and cities that a camp consisting of conscripts and national guards would be established in the Szeged area. But on 12 June, the Hungarian troops led by Lieutenant General János Hrabovszky, trying to put down the Serbian revolt, were forced to retreat in the Battle of Karlóca, which emboldened the Serbs even more, to revolt against the Hungarian government. On 13 June, he ordered the mobilization of 2–4,000 national guards in the counties threatened by the Croat and Serb movements. From mid-June onwards, the southern counties took successive measures to mobilize their national guardsmen and place them on the Bács County defense line.

Although the size of the force thus formed, consisting of National Guards, Honvéds, and K.u.K. Infantry and Cavalry units, was considerable, the loyalty of the non-Hungarian soldiers, quite numerous in the K.u.K. troops, could hardly be counted on. The national guards, mostly of Hungarian nationality, were not suitable for actual military operations, but only for garrison and other security duties. No wonder, then, that this - already fragmented - conscripted army was unable to destroy the Serb military camps. Its strength was only enough to prevent the rebels from gaining further ground.

Evolution of the number of Hungarian troops in Southern Hungary:

Date	Men in total	Conscripts, hussars and honvéds	National guards	Cannons
Middle July	41,490	14,300	27,190	63
8 August	40,207	19,765	20,442	47
18 August	35,100	14,400	10,890	61

On 24 June, Hungarian Royal Commissioner Péter Csernovits signed an armistice with the Serbs, who used it to strengthen their positions and did not keep the ceasefire. This was already shown by the massacre in Újvidék (Novi Sad), and on 30 June the village of Magyarszentmihály was raided and burnt to the ground. When the ceasefire expired on 4 July, the Main Odbor (the Serbian National Assembly) declared that the rebels would not disperse, but would wait for First Archbishop Josif Rajačić's return from Zagreb (where he discussed the anti-Hungarian alliance with the leader of Croatia, Josip Jelačić) and that the status quo would remain until then.

In the middle of July, the Serbs launched a general attack, but their attacks carried out on a long frontline were repulsed everywhere by the imperial troops and the Hungarian national guards. The most serious clash was on 11 July in the Battle of Versec. The garrison of Versec, consisting mostly of K.u.K. troops, advanced in battle formation against the 3,800-strong Serbian attack column, half of which were border guards of the Military Frontier. The advancing Serbs were attacked in the flank and from the back by the Hussars and the Uhlans, and then the infantry put them to flight with a bayonet charge. The Serb losses were 303 dead and nearly 200 prisoners.

But the Hungarian attack on Szenttamás three days later failed. After this Hungarian defeat, on 14-15 and 16–17 July, the Serbian garrison of the Roman ramparts (Note: defensive works from the ancient times, stretching between the Danube and the Tisza from Apatin to Bácsföldvár, used very successfully by the Serbs against the Hungarians during the 1848-1849 revolutionary war) attacked and occupied Bácsföldvár, whose Hungarian possession threatened both the Roman ramparts and Szenttamás. On 16 July, at Futak, the National Guards and K.u.K. soldiers from Szabadka repelled another Serbian attack.

The aim of the Serb insurgents in Bánság at this time was to capture Nagybecskerek, and thus the district of Nagykikinda. Therefore, on 15 July, Lieutenant Đorđe Stratimirović's troops attacked the garrison led by Colonel Ernő Kiss of Écska, but the garrison repulsed them. The occupation of Pancsova and the burning of the village of Uzdin, inhabited by Romanians, on 23 July were intended to advance here. On 3 and 6 August, heavy fighting took place in the areas of Szárcsa, Ernesztáza, and Neuzina, in which the Serbs were eventually defeated.

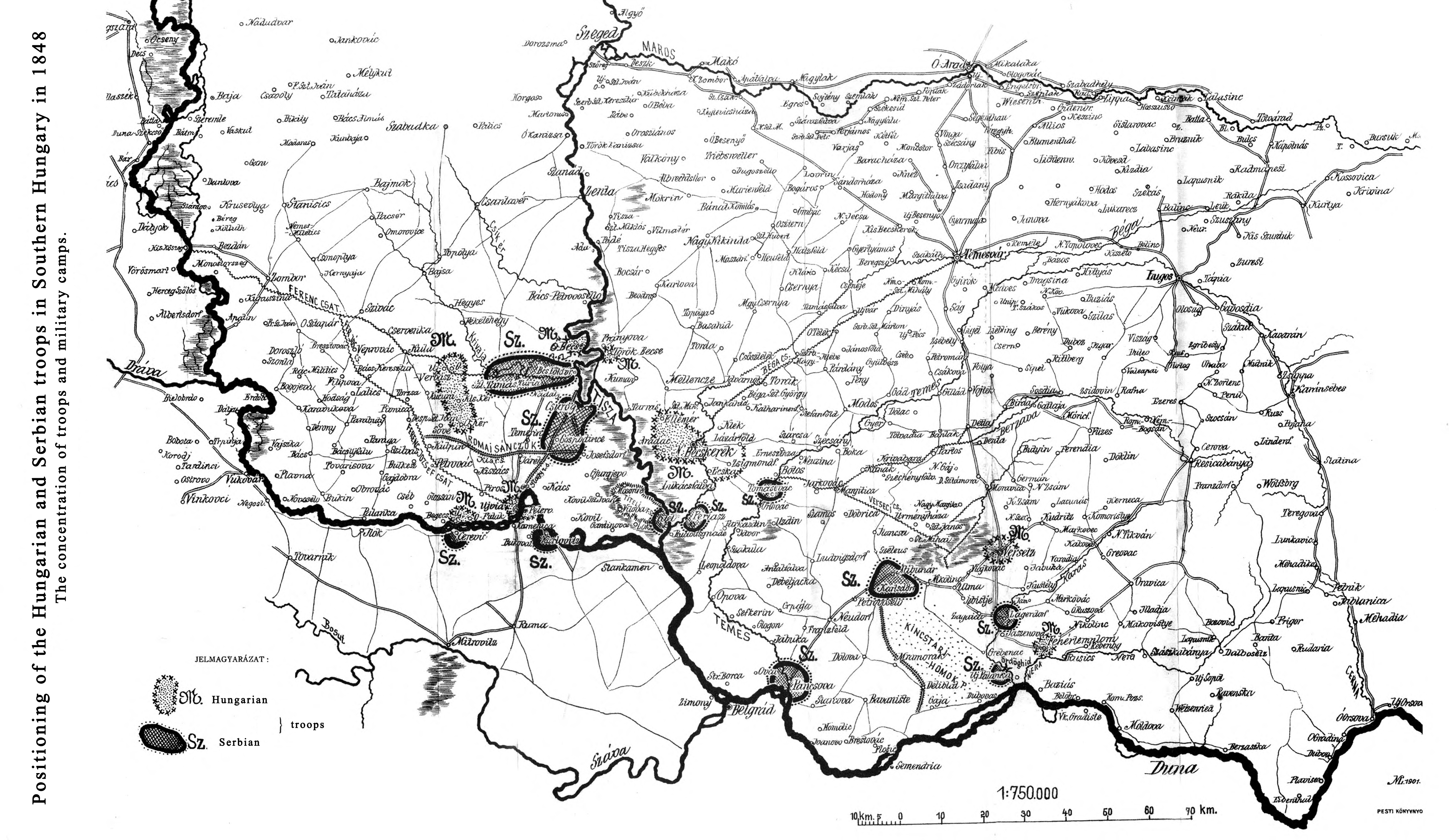
The positioning of the Hungarian and Serbian troops in 1848 with the Hungarian and Serbian troops concentrations and fortified camps

By the beginning of August, a coherent Hungarian defence line had been established in Bácska and Bánság. Stratimirović attacked the Hungarian camp from Verbász on 1 and 3 August but was repulsed both times. On 10 August it attacked Temerin and Járek and on 13 August again Verbász without success.

Lieutenant General Fülöp Bechtold, who had moved his headquarters to Versec on 17 August, decided to launch another attack on Szenttamás, but it failed again on 19 August. At the end of the month, Stratimirović's troops launched two attacks, and on 30 August they captured Temerin and Járek. As a result of this Serbian success, the connection between the Hungarian forces in Bácska and the fortress of Pétervárad was cut, and a continuous Serbian front line was established from Szenttamás through the Roman ramparts to Titel, and from there to Perlasz, Tomasevác, Alibunár to Strázsa.

A serious obstacle in the way of the Serbian forces in Bánság was the town of Fehértemplom, the only town in the border region that stood by the Hungarian government. The soldiers of the Serbian military camps in Vracsegáj and Lokva were constantly attacking the city. On 2 August, the garrison of Fehértemplom, led by Lieutenant Colonel Le Gay, attacked and destroyed the Serb camp from the Lokva forest. The K.u.K. troops, however, soon left the town, while the Serbs established two smaller camps around the town in addition to the Vracsevgáj camp. After the departure of the K.u.K. troops, the defense of Fehértemplom was taken over by Captain Ferenc Maderspach. At 1 am on 19 August, the Serbs led by Stevan Knićanin attacked the city from three directions, and by morning had taken the Serb-inhabited part of the city. In the afternoon, however, Maderspach's guards recaptured the whole town. Shortly afterward reinforcements arrived from Versec under Colonel Blomberg, but they did not take part in the fighting. After the failed offensive, the Serbs tried to negotiate the departure of the Hungarian troops, but they imposed such humiliating conditions on the town's population that the citizens refused to accept them. At the same time, Austria's consul in Belgrade, Colonel Ferdinand Mayerhofer von Grünhübel, did his best to support the Serbians, and convince the government from Serbia, to send more troops to Hungary, which was a strong signal to the leaders of the non-Hungarian supplemented Imperial regiments, put under the command of the Hungarian government, stationing in the Bácska and Bánság regions, convincing them that the Empire preferred to support the Serbs against the Hungarians and that they, therefore, did not have to fight on the side of the Hungarians.

On 30 August, Knićanin launched another attack on Fehértemplom but was repulsed by the 9th Honvéd Battalion, which had been deployed there in the meantime, and the city's National Guard. The K.u.K. troops led by Colonel Blomberg did not intervene in the fighting, and the officers of Blomberg's regiment, the 2nd (Schwarzenberg) Uhlan Regiment, declared that they would henceforth limit their operations to the defense of Versec, but would not fight against the Serbian border guards.

On 7 September, the Hungarian garrison in Fehértemplom raided the Serbian camp in Vrachevga and destroyed it. To make up for this, the Serbs set up military camps at Ördöghídja and Strázsa to break the connection between Fehértemplom and Versec.

== Prelude ==
At the same time as the actions against Fehértemplom, fighting also began in the mining district of Krassó, after most of the local border guards had also switched to the side of the insurgents. On 22 August, 400 Serb insurgents attacked Újmoldova. After a five-hour battle, Major Lajos Asbóth, who was defending the mining town, retreated to Németszászka, and the Serbs set fire to Újmoldova. On 28 August, a Hungarian detachment led by Captain Sándor Rácz returned the loan and defeated the Serbs camped in Ómoldova.

Map of the Serbian defensive trenches at Perlasz, Titel, Vilovo, Mošorin, Kamenac in 1849

Of the Serbian military camps in Bánság, the Perlasz camp, was the third camp built after those from Karlóca and the Roman entrenchments, being established in mid-June, under the command of retired K.u.K. Lieutenant Jovan Drakulić, Colonel of the Serbian National Guards. This camp was built in opposition to Nagybecskerek and, together with Alibunár, was a solid base for the Serb uprising. The Serbian communities south and east of the camp were subordinated to the Perlasz camp. All actions from here to the north threatened especially Nagybecskerek and its surroundings. The Perlasz Serb military camp was located on the left bank of the Béga canal, on the Perlasz-Écska road, about 4 km from the village of Perlasz. The camp, which was at a forest guardhouse, was surrounded by a continuous defensive trench system of parallel ramparts, the outer trench of which was 2 m deep and 4 m wide. The camp was situated on a slightly elevated area, with its western and northern sides descending steeply towards the Béga. The higher southern part overlooked the surrounding area. Closer to Perlasz, a massive redoubt has been built at Jáncsa Hill (Jancova Hunka). The camp had about 500 thatched huts to house the troops. The camp had 300 border guards at the beginning of July, and 5,000 border guards and 300 Servians in mid-July. The Serb troops consisted mainly of well-trained border guards, Šajkaši units, Servians, and volunteers from Serbian villages in Hungary. 12 cannons were deployed on the parapets. 4 of these were placed on the open outpost trench. The guns in the camp were mostly of small caliber.

At the beginning of August, due to the constant incursions of the Serbs from Perlasz, the soldiers of the Hungarian camp in Écska sent a delegation to Colonel Ernő Kiss, the commander of the camp from Nagybecskerek, and asked him to allow them to attack the camp. Kiss was not against the idea of an attack, and success was necessary before all, because of the public anger at the failure of the second siege of Szenttamás and the destruction by the Serbs, of Temerin and Járek. By capturing Perlasz, the connection between Titel and Tomasevác could be severed, and Kiss could also secure his property from Elemér from Serbian attacks. Colonel Kiss Ernő urged the government to send a strong force to be able to strike a decisive blow at the Perlasz camp as soon as he felt capable of undertaking this mission.

After he received the reinforcements, Kiss had at his disposition the following forces:

- 3. battalion of the 37th (Michael) infantry regiment (6 companies=450 soldiers);
- 3. battalion of the 39th (Dom Miguel) infantry regiment (5 companies);
- 10. Honvéd battalion (6 companies);
- Woroniecki jäger troop (2 companies);
- Bihar national guard battalion (7 1/2 companies);
- Volunteers from Lukácsfalva (160 men);
- Nagybecskerek national guard battalion (6 companies);
- 2nd (Hannover) hussar regiment (6 companies);
- 6th (Württemberg) hussar regiment (3 companies);
- Artillery (20 cannons).

Total: 8000 soldiers and 20 cannons.

Kiss allocated a large part of his forces to guarding the surrounding villages and watching the roads to ensure the attack. Because of this, he remained with only 2500 troops to attack Perlasz. The plan for the capture of the Perlasz camp was prepared by Lieutenant Colonel Antal Vetter from the 37th Infantry Regiment, and Colonel Kiss approved it and set the date for its realization for September 2. According to the battle plan, the right flank led by Captain Pál Kiss, numbering about 300 men, had to advance on the right bank of the Béga River and drew the attention of the Serbs. Meanwhile, the center (the 3rd Battalion of the 37th Infantry Regiment, the 10th Battalion, two companies of the 6th Hussars Regiment, 8 guns) had to attack the camp from the front in the early hours of the morning, and if they succeed in taking it, they had to cover the entrenchments and blow up the Jančova Hill from the center of the camp. If the ambush attack failed, the camp had to be attacked after artillery preparation. If the capture of the camp was successful, the six companies of the 2nd Hussars on the left flank would pursue the enemy; but Kiss, as a Hussar officer, reserved the further orders for himself, i.e. the pursuit could only begin on his orders.

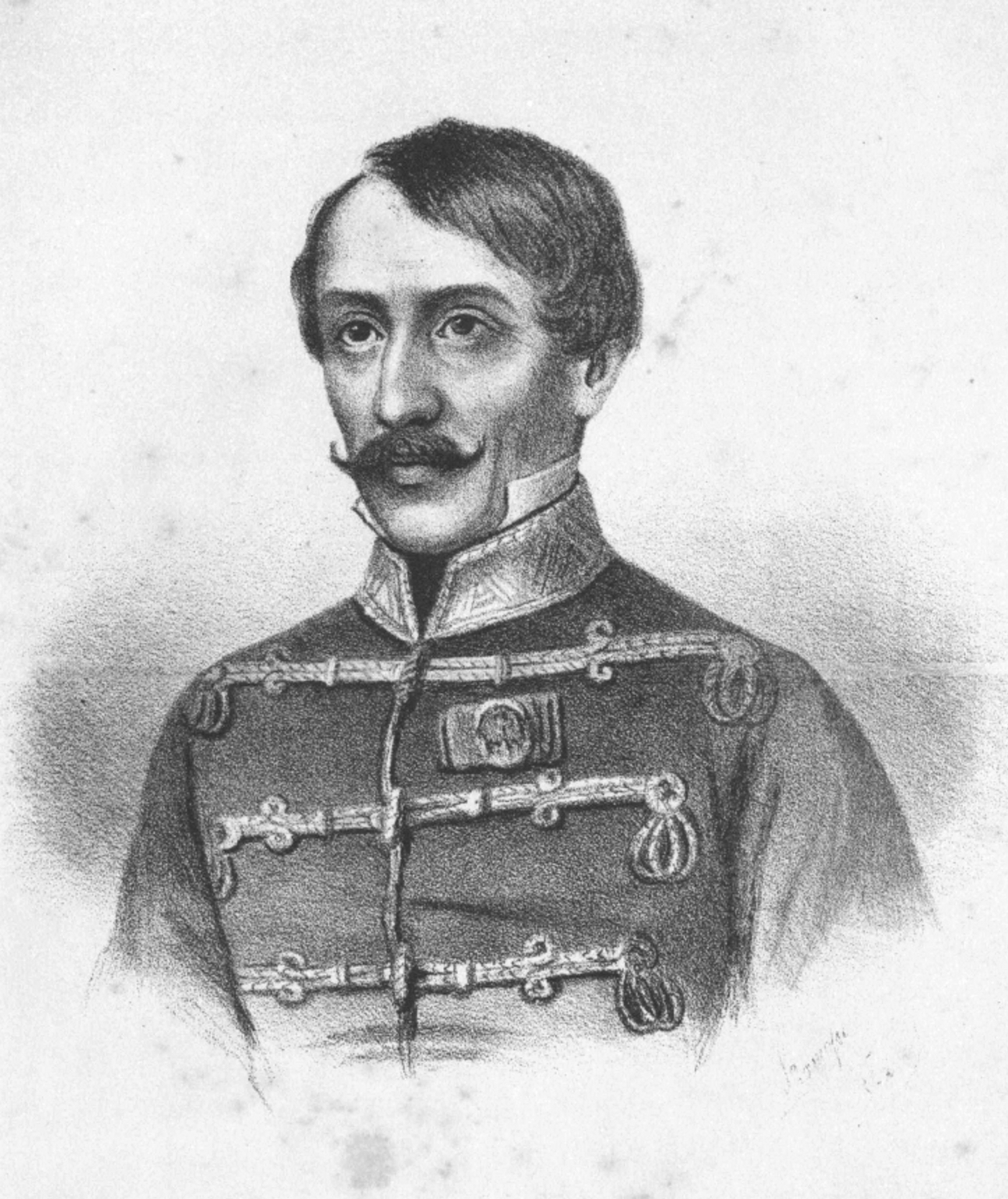
Kiss Ernő 1849

The plan was that on the night of 1 to 2 September, Colonel Ernő Kiss had to march with the troops from Nagybecskerek to Écska to join the troops under the command of Lieutenant Colonel Vetter, which was guarding the road towards Perlasz. The attacking columns started their march at three in the morning. The three companies of the Wasa Infantry Regiment (13th, 14th and 15th), in order to secure the advance of Ernő Kiss's troops from the right flank at the Tisza, was directed on 1 September to Kumán and from there down along the Tisza. The main purpose of this troop was to secure the crossing at Zsablya, to prevent the Serb troops from Bácska from crossing the Tisza and attacking Nagybecskerek via Aradác. The localities on the right bank of the river were in Serbian hands. Nagybecskerek is a 2 1/2-hour walk from the Zsablya crossing - via Aradác.

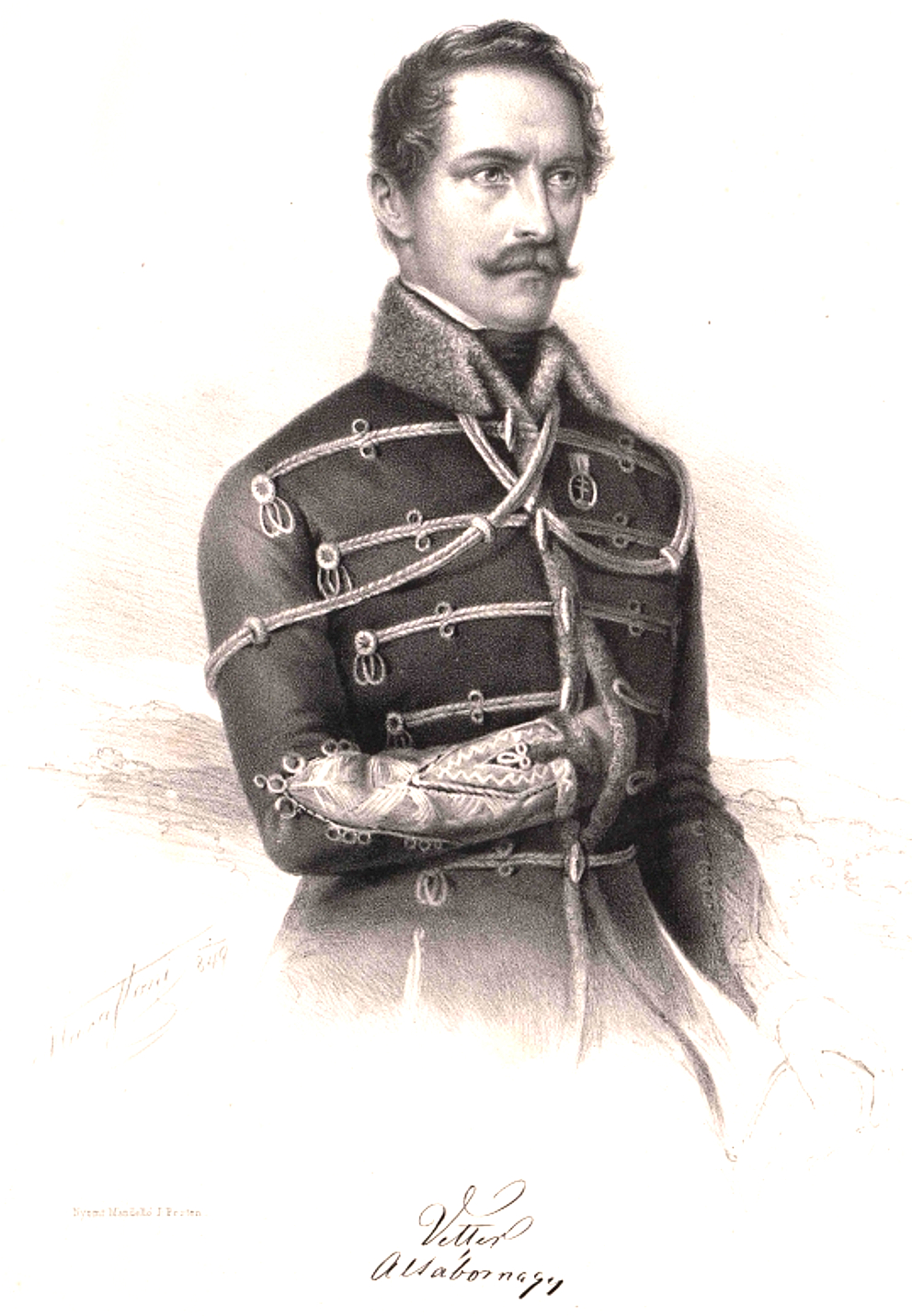
Vetter Antal

The Hungarian troops arrived near the Serbian camp at 5 am. Here, Lieutenant Colonel Vetter took over the command of the infantry and artillery. Meanwhile, 2 companies of Prince Mieczysław Woroniecki's Pest Jäger Volunteers bypassed the entrenchment from the northeast; to their left, 3 companies of the 39th (Dom Miguel) infantry regiment were deploying. These formed the left flank of the attacking troops. On the right flank, facing the northern main line of the Serbian entrenchment system the 6th Company of the 37th (Michael) Infantry Regiment, the 10th Honvéd Battalion, and the Bihar National Guard Company were positioned. To observe the eastern flank of the entrenchments, namely the redoubt and its exit towards the village of Perlasz - on the extreme left flank of the Hungarian troops - 6 companies of Hanover and Württenberg hussars were deployed. The guns were sent forward as close to the weakest points of the enemy defenses as possible. Because of the terrain, they could only be set up on the north and north-eastern front line.

The Hungarian plan was based on a surprise attack; Kiss planned to storm the camp unexpectedly so that the surprised Serbs could not receive aid from Titel from the right bank of the Tisza or be assisted from another direction. However, the Serbs of Nagybecskerek had already warned the Perlasz camp of the impending danger with fire signals. Because of this, in the camp, they were waiting for the Hungarians in full battle readiness. Therefore, in the twilight of the dawn, the Serbs sensed the Hungarian troops marching, and the surprise was not to be. Fortunately for them, the Hungarians were also prepared for the possibility that the surprise failed.

== Battle ==
The attack started after 5 am. The fighting was started by the Serbian artillery. The Hungarians responded to the firing and a fierce artillery battle developed. The Serbs' cannon fire had relatively little effect, while the Hungarian artillery set fire to the huts and the commander Drakulić's house from the camp. Finally, the Hungarian battery on the left flank pushed closer to the Serb camp and, despite its personnel being composed of rookie artillerymen from Arad, silenced all but one from the cannons of the Serb battery from Jančova Hill. The flames started from the thatched huts caused great confusion among the Serbian troops. The Hungarian command, in order to take advantage of this confusion, sent the infantry troops on the attack. Amid the incessant roar of cannons, the Hungarian army pushed towards the Serbian camp from three sides.

Meanwhile, Pál Kiss's detachment, the 10th Honvéd Battalion, crossed the Béga and attacked the Serbian camp's ramparts, but the Serbs defended themselves so tenaciously that it was feared that the detachment would be pushed into the river. Therefore, Lieutenant-Colonel Antal Vetter, leading the Hungarian center, sent the 3rd Battalion of the 37th Infantry Regiment to support Kiss. But the Serbs continued to resist tenaciously. Vetter also sent Woroniecki's Jägers to the floodplain of the Béga. Finally, the National Guards were also sent against the Serbs' entrenchments.

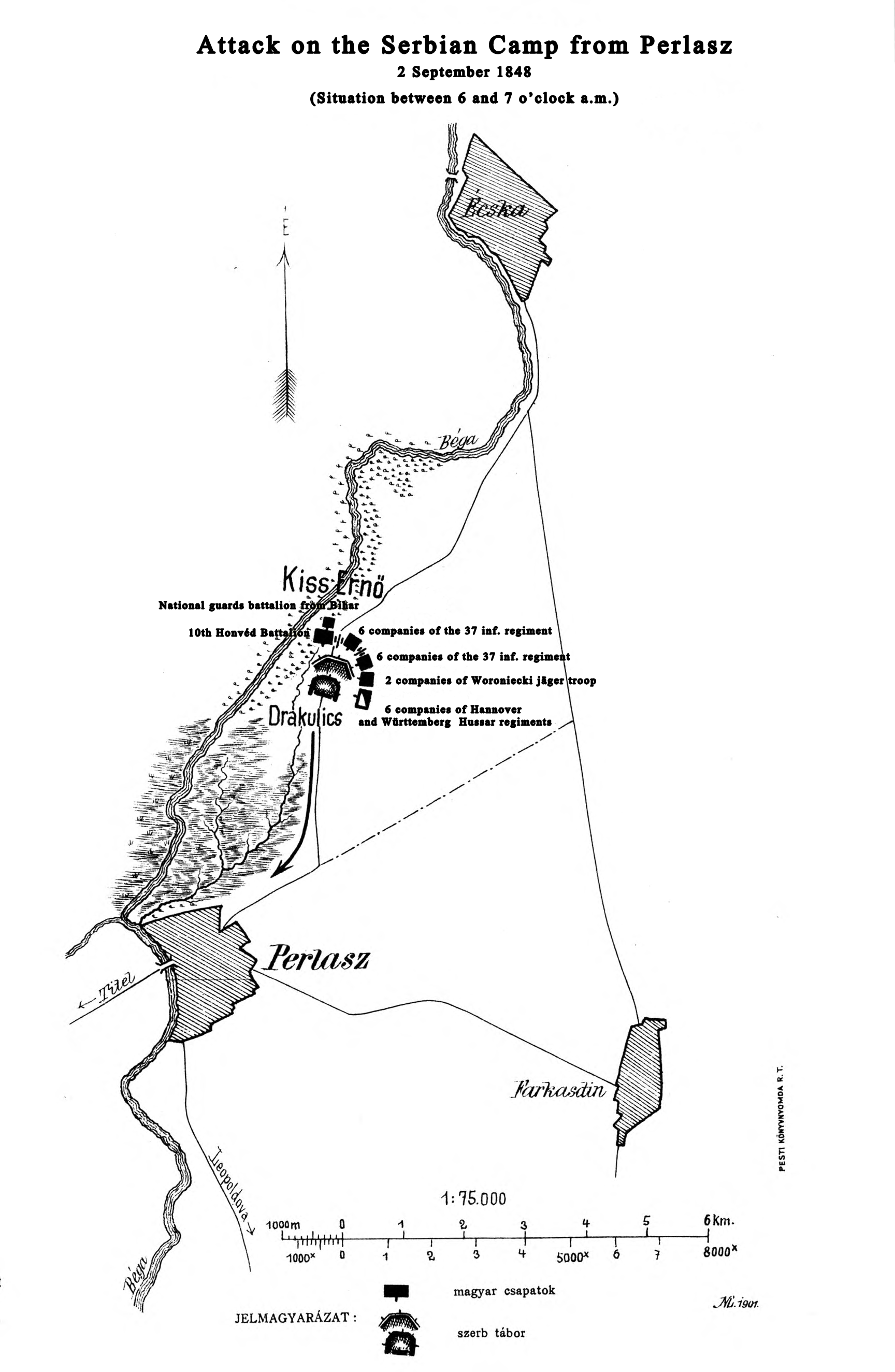
Map of the Battle of Perlasz (2 September 1848)

The Serb insurgents were desperate to defend their positions. At first, they tried to stop the attackers with rifle fire, and only when that failed did they attack them with their scimitars. A terrible, deadly fight ensued. After sending forward the 3rd Battalion of the 37th Infantry Regiment and the Woroniecki Jägers, Vetter saw the time for a decisive attack and hurried to the 10th Honvéd Battalion. He jumped down from his horse and with his sword in hand, he led the right flank of the battalion to charge. The soldiers followed him with their bayonets, and broke into the camp. They began the assault from the numerically superior right flank against the trenches. The infantrymen of the Michael Regiment were the first to climb the ramparts and penetrate the Serbian camp; then the 10th Honvéd Battalion pushed in. The success of the right wing encouraged the left wing. Woroniecky's volunteer Jäger companies, led by the Polish Prince himself, dismounting from his horse, advanced against the entrenchments, and so did also the Dom Miguel infantry. The Serbs "greeted" the Hungarians with a hail of bullets.

The assault lasted barely ten minutes, the rebels could not withstand the Hungarian bayonet charge and, abandoning their defense, began to run. The Serbs fled to the redoubt behind them, but the Hungarians pursued them and simultaneously penetrated into the closed entrenchment, from which, after a short period of fierce fighting, the Serbs were completely chased out. The company of the Bihar National Guards, which was in reserve behind the right wing, under the encouragement and command of Pál Kiss from the 37th Regiment, followed the example of the regulars with death-defying contempt, and despite their imperfect weapons and inadequate training, resolutely stormed and chased out of their position an enemy squadron, which dug itself in the thicket near the road behind the redoubt, trying to hold up and disturb the Hungarian right wing. The Serbian artillerymen were killed by the bayonets of the Hungarian infantry. At eight in the morning, after 3 hours of fighting, the Perlasz Serb fortified camp was in Hungarian hands. Kiss himself praised the honvéds, saying that even Napoleon never had such an assault.

The rebels were scattered and Drakulić himself, with 200 men, fled to Titel with the wagons, kept ready for this eventuality. The other Serbs, with their wagons ready behind the camp (but also on foot), fled partly to Sakule (Torontálsziget) and partly to Leopoldova (Csenta) and back home.

== Aftermath ==
The soldiers took no prisoners, the Serbs suffered 250-300 casualties. The Hungarians obtained a rich booty; among other things, they captured 12 cannons, 20 hundredweight of gunpowder, and 60,000 cartridges, which, according to the experts, came from the Viennese war arsenal. According to other data, 2 one-pounder, 5 three-pounder, and 2 six-pounder guns and 1 bomb launcher mortar, a large quantity of ammunition (30 hundredweight of gunpowder and 68,000 rifle cartridges) fell into Hungarian possession during the search of Perlasz. Colonel Kiss created a battery from the captured guns. The total loss of the Hungarian troops was 14 killed and 69 wounded soldiers. Pál Szemere, the major of the 10th Battalion, was seriously wounded, and on 8 September he died of his wound.

After the capture of the camp, Colonel Kiss advanced to the village Perlasz with a battalion of the Michael regiment, a squadron of hussars, and a battery. The Serb inhabitants left the village and only the Germans remained. Intelligence patrols were launched from Perlasz towards Titel. They returned with a report that the Serbs had dismantled the bridge on the Tisza at Titel and were preparing to defend the crossing point.

The victory might have been even more brilliant if Kiss had deployed the cavalry (720 hussars), and had attacked the fleeing Serbs, but the Serbs who had evacuated the camp reached Titel safely. By not pursuing and destroying the fleeing Serbs with the cavalry, Kiss gave them the opportunity to perform a counterattack against Perlasz from Szakula and Titel after a few days.

The Hungarians put the population of the village to destroy the Perlas camp. In Perlas, the troops were placed under the command of Lieutenant Colonel Vetter - some of the troops were left there, while the other troops were sent back to Nagybecskerek, where they arrived at 6-7 pm that day. The 3 companies of the Wasa regiment, which had marched down the Tisza, marched back to Óbecse, where they arrived 5 days later.

Kiss didn't take advantage of the victory, although if he had continued his advance then, there would have been no obstacle before him until Pancsova. Although the victory seemed to be of local significance, and was seen by the Hungarians more as a moral victory, it came at the best possible time. At the same time that Jellačić was about to invade Hungary, the Serbs themselves were preparing to launch a general attack, and the victory from Perlasz caused such panic among the Serbian command that they abandoned this plan. They only succeeded in ransacking Kiss's estate and castle from Elemér, which Kiss then avenged by executing a few captured rebels.

The brigade of Ernő Kiss had to leave Perlasz and retreat to its former position; all the more so because after the destruction of the Perlasz camp, on 9 September Knićanin's Serbian troops came from the east, set up another fortified camp at Tomasevác at the Temes River, barely 3 miles (20 km) from Nagybecskerek.

On the same day, under the command of Lieutenant Stefanović, with 3,000 men and 7 guns, the Serbs entered Perlasz, abandoned earlier by the Hungarians, and attempted to rebuild the fortifications. The plan was for the two columns (Knićanin's and Stefanović's) to attack Nagybecskerek from two directions. The Hungarian troops on Écska learned about the plan, and Colonel Vetter was determined to prevent it at all costs. The Serbs took up position on the vineyards not far from the former military camp, and under the leadership of Lieutenant Živanović they started to build a closed entrenchment, but they did not finish it before the Hungarian attack. Vetter gathered up the troops from Écska and moved towards Perlasz. Vetter approached the half-finished entrenchments at a distance of 600 paces, and after the enemy had fired a few grenades, he sent the Máriássy battalion and the 10th Honvéd Battalion on the attack. They immediately occupied the half-finished entrenchments and then pushed the Serbs toward Perlasz. Stefanović tried to hold the village, and set up his guns on the southeast side of Perlasz, at the windmill. Meanwhile, from Nagybecskerek, Colonel Ernő Kiss arrived with his troops, led his infantry to the attack, and with his cavalry - the 2nd (Hannover) Hussars - tried to cut off the Serbs' retreat towards Leopoldova. This had its effect: after a short street fight, the Serbs evacuated Perlasz and fled towards Titel, Szakula, Farkasd, and Leopoldova. Their losses were two guns, a lot of weapons, and many dead and wounded.

But, despite this setback, the Serbs did not stop attacking. On 11 September, they crossed the Tisza at Mosorin, and under the command of Lieutenant Agić, they pushed towards Aradác, and under Stratimirović towards Elemér. They captured both villages, but the third column - led by Knićanin - did not move from Tomasevác. Ernő Kiss had launched an unsuccessful attack against Tomasevác the day before, and after the attack, he left part of his troops in front of the village, so that Knićanin did not dare to move. Thus, the concentrated Serbian attack against Nagybecskerek was cancelled. Ernő Kiss took advantage of the situation and sent Major Appel to retake Aradác and Elemér on the 12th. The detachment retook first Aradac and then Elemér, the Serbs fled to Titel and from there to Tomasevác.

In the end, the victory in Perlasz went unused, and Ernő Kiss had a big responsibility in this. However, the moral significance of the victory was nevertheless considerable. It proved that the Serbs could be stopped not only in defensive but also in offensive battles; that the Serb fortified camps could be captured with sufficient preparation. The victory was also important because it showed that, under the right leadership, units of Hussars, Honvéds, volunteers, and the National Guards can work well together. All of this made Perlasz a main rehearsal for the battles to come for the new Hungarian army, lacking the help of the K.u.K. troops, which started, little by little, to become more and more neutral, but with time, even more and more hostile to them, as the Austrian emperor openly turned against the Hungarian Revolutionary Government.

== Sources ==
- Bánlaky, József (2001). A magyar nemzet hadtörténelme ("The Military History of the Hungarian Nation) (in Hungarian). Budapest: Arcanum Adatbázis.
- Bóna, Gábor (1987). Tábornokok és törzstisztek a szabadságharcban 1848–49 ("Generals and Staff Officers in the War of Freedom 1848–1849") (in Hungarian). Budapest: Zrínyi Katonai Kiadó. p. 430. ISBN 963-326-343-3.
- Borovszky Samu. Torontál vármegye Magyarország vármegyéi és városai. Országos Monográfia Társaság (1912) Budapest
- Hermann, Róbert (2001), 1848-1849 a szabadságharc hadtörténete ("Military History of 1848-1849") (in Hungarian), Budapest: Korona, ISBN 963-9376-21-3
- Hermann, Róbert (2004). Az 1848–1849-es szabadságharc nagy csatái ("Great battles of the Hungarian Revolution of 1848-1849") (in Hungarian). Budapest: Zrínyi. p. 408. ISBN 963-327-367-6.
- Hermann, Róbert (2013). Nagy csaták. 15. A magyar önvédelmi háború ("Great Battles. 15. The Hungarian War od Self Defense") (in Hungarian). Budapest: Duna Könyvklub. p. 88. ISBN 978-615-5013-99-7.
- Olchváry, Ödön (1999). A magyar függetlenségi harc 1848-1849-ben a Délvidéken (in Hungarian). Budapest: Márkus Samu Könyvnyomdája.
