= Lokve =

Lokve is a South Slavic toponym:

- Lokve, Serbia, a village near Alibunar
- Lokve, Croatia, a municipality in Gorski Kotar
  - Lake Lokve, an artificial lake in Gorski Kotar
- Lokve, Krško, a village in Slovenia
- Lokve, Nova Gorica, a village in Slovenia
- Lokve, Črnomelj, a village in Slovenia
- Lokve, Foča, a village in Bosnia and Herzegovina
- Lokve, Hadžići, a village in Bosnia and Herzegovina
- Lokve, Čapljina, a village in Bosnia and Herzegovina
- Lokve pri Dobrniču, a village near Trebnje, Slovenia
- Lokve, Split, an administrative division of Split, Croatia

== See also ==
- Lokva
