= Pirniče =

Pirniče may also refer to:

- Zgornje Pirniče (literally, 'Upper Pirniče'), a village on the bank of the Sava River in the Municipality of Medvode in Slovenia
- Spodnje Pirniče (literally, 'Lower Pirniče'), a village on the bank of the Sava River in the Municipality of Medvode in Slovenia
