= List of settlements in the Federation of Bosnia and Herzegovina/L =

== La ==
Lađanica, Laleta

== Le ==
Lendava

== Li ==
Lisičići, Livno

== Lo ==
Lokva, Lokve, Lokve

== Lu ==
Lug, Luka, Lukarice, Lukavac, Lukomir, Lukšije
