= Franc Rozman =

Slovenian partisan commander (1912–1944)

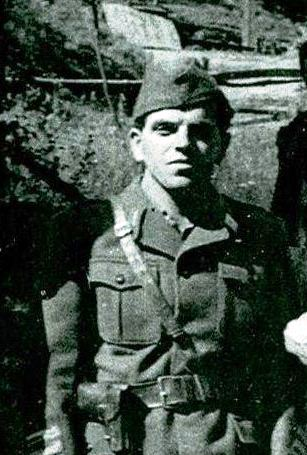
- Rozman in 1943
- Born: 27 March 1911; Spodnje Pirniče, Carniola, Austria-Hungary
- Died: 7 November 1944 (aged 33); Lokve, Črnomelj, Adriatic Littoral, Nazi Germany (now Slovenia)
- Other name: Stane Mlinar
- Military career
- Allegiance: Royal Yugoslav Army; International Brigades; Liberation Front of the Slovenian People.
- Service years: 1932–1939; 1941–1944
- Rank: Lieutenant General
- Commands: Slovene Partisans
- Awards: People's Hero of Yugoslavia

Franc Rozman, nom de guerre Stane (Slovene convention: Franc Rozman – Stane) or Stane Mlinar (27 March 1911 – 7 November 1944), was a Slovene Partisan commander in World War II.

== Early life ==
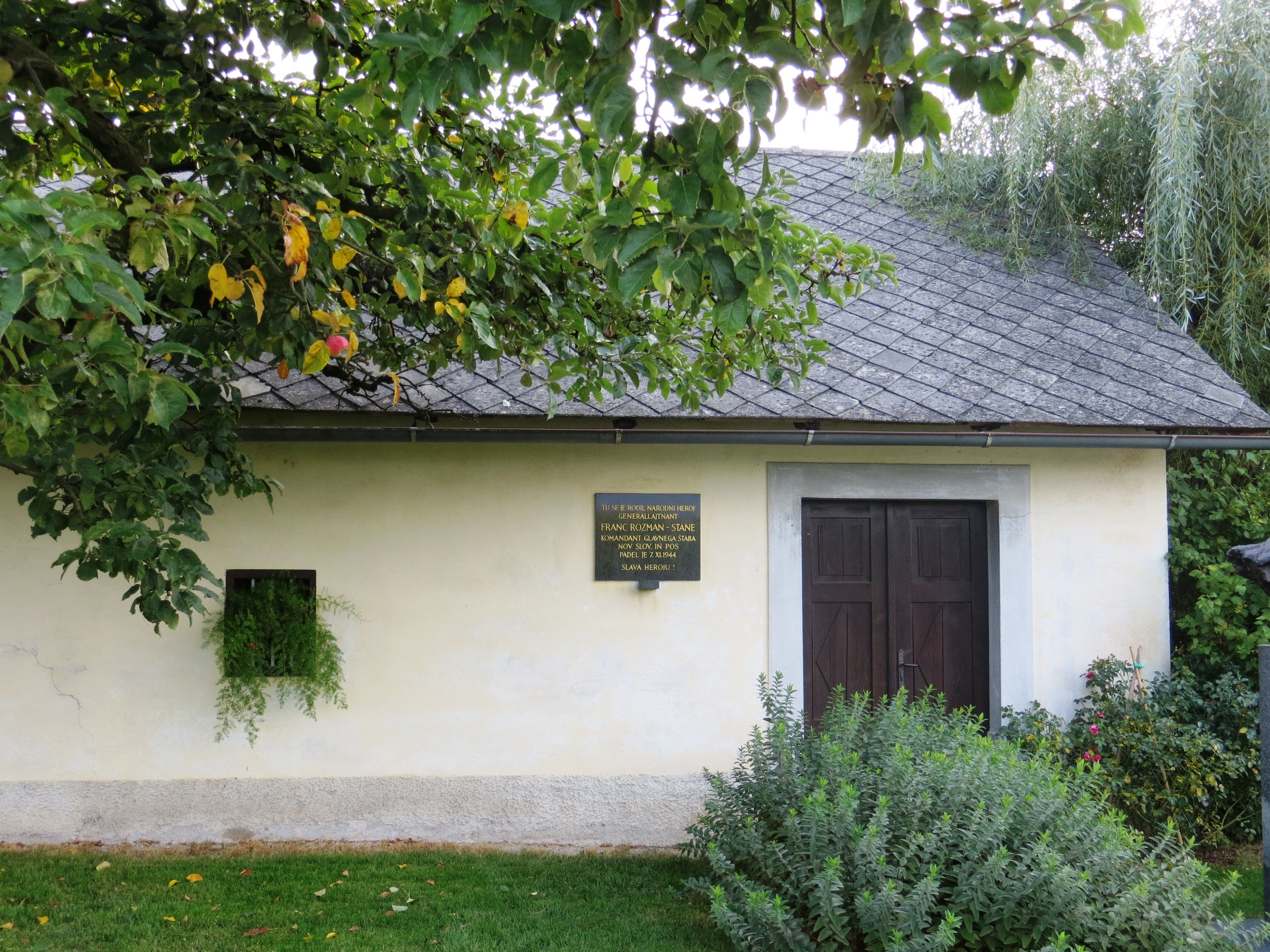
House where Franc Rozman was born

Franc Rozman was born in the Carniolan village of Spodnje Pirniče near Ljubljana, part of Austria-Hungary at the time, to a Slovene working-class family. His father Franc Rozman was a railway track-worker, while his mother Marjana (née Stare) was a housewife. He was the third of four children, with two elder sisters, Marjeta and Terezija, and a younger brother, Martin.

At the age of three, Rozman's father died on the Eastern Front, where he fought as a soldier in the Austro-Hungarian Army. Rozman had a poor and hard childhood. His sisters Marjeta and Terezija were sent to an orphanage, while Franc and his brother Martin remained in Pirniče. At the age of 15, he worked in a tavern and then trained as an apprentice baker.

As a young boy he had great enthusiasm for a military career, but his application to the military school was rejected. In spring 1932, he did his military service in the Royal Yugoslav army.

== Military experience prior to World War II ==
In 1935, after the Italian invasion of Ethiopia, Rozman tried unsuccessfully to join the Ethiopian forces fighting the Italian invaders. Soon after the outbreak of the Spanish Civil War, he decided to travel to Spain. Rozman was among the first Yugoslav volunteers in Spain, where he, on 1 October 1936 joined the International Brigades. In November 1936 he became a member of the Spanish Communist Party.

In Jarama he completed non commissioned officers' school, became a lieutenant and a commander of a company, then captain and commander of a battalion. His comrades in arms remembered him as an energetic and earnest person. After the Spanish Civil War, he was imprisoned in France. He became a member of the Yugoslav Communist Party in 1939. In April 1941 he was imprisoned and sentenced to forced labor in Germany. In July the same year he fled Germany and returned to Yugoslavia.

== World War II ==
For a while, Rozman lived with an activist of the Liberation Front of the Slovenian People. In early December 1941, he visited his younger brother, Martin, after which he joined the Slovene partisan resistance. Soon he became a military instructor with the High Command of the Slovene partisan forces. He was given the task of setting up the Styrian Battalion (Štajerski bataljon), which would consist of the partisan troops, the Revirje and the Savinja companies (Revirske in Savinjske čete), which were active in Styria in the autumn of 1941. He participated in the attack on Šoštanj and later in the Battle of Čreta. The Germans repeatedly tried to liquidate Rozman, setting many ambushes.

In the April 1942 Rozman became the commander of a Slovene partisan brigade, established on 5 April 1942 at Kremenik in Lower Carniola, and numbering more than 300 fighters. Measured by composition, organization, training, and fighting power, this was the most powerful Slovene partisan unit at that time. On 13 July 1943, he became a commander of the High Command of the Slovene partisan army with the rank of lieutenant general (generallajtnant), which he held up to his death.

Rozman died on 7 November 1944, aged 33, in White Carniola as a consequence of a serious wound received while testing newly arrived PIAT weapons sent to the partisans by their British Allies. There were some rumors that he was killed by sabotage by the Chetnik military authorities or at the behest of Partisan commander Arso Jovanović, but they have never been proven. He was proclaimed a People's Hero of Yugoslavia four days later, on 11 November 1944.

== Legacy ==
"Commander Stane", as he was nicknamed by the partisan fighters, was one of the most prominent figures of the Yugoslav front of the Second World War. His legacy is controversial and questions have been raised about his involvement in wartime liquidations of civilians.

His legacy includes the following:

- There is a plaque on the house in Spodnje Pirniče where he was born, which has also been turned into a small museum. A bust of Rozman also stands in front of the house.
- There is a monument in downtown Ljubljana, at the corner of Slovene Street (Slovenska cesta) and Šubic Street (Šubičeva ulica), dedicated to Rozman.
- The well-known partisan song "Komandant Stane" ('Commander Stane') is dedicated to him.
- Many Slovene schools bear his name; for example, the Franc "Stane" Rozman primary schools in Ljubljana and Maribor.
- On 21 March 2011, Slovenia issued a two-euro commemorative coin to mark the 100th anniversary of the birth of Franc Rozman.
- The former Franc "Stane" Rozman Barracks (Vojašnica Franca Rozmana–Staneta) at Ljubljana-Polje were named for Rozman until July 2012, when they were renamed in honor of Edvard Peperko (1966–1991), one of the first to fall in the Slovenian Ten-Day War. The renaming was opposed by the Partisan veteran organization, opposition parties, and one of the coalition parties.
