= Lokva =

Lokva may refer to:

- Lokva, Serbia, a village near Knjaževac
- Lokva, Konjic, a village in Bosnia and Herzegovina
- Lokva, Kosovo, a village near Zvečan
- Lokva River, in the Pivka Basin in Slovenia

== See also ==
- Lokva Rogoznica
- Lokve
