= Perlez =

Perlez Перлез
- Village (Selo)
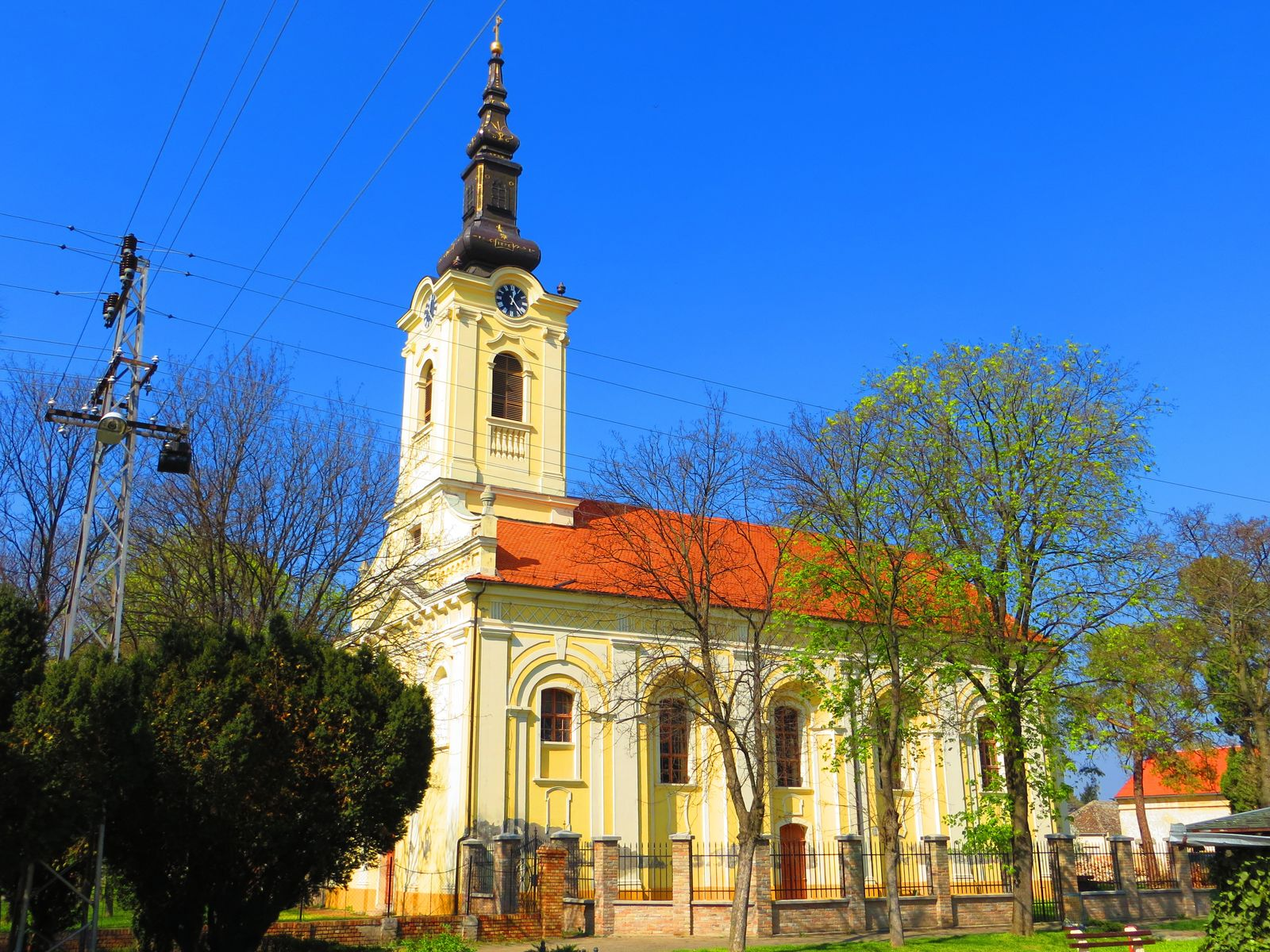
- Orthodox church

- Location within Serbia Perlez (Serbia) Perlez (Europe)
- Coordinates: 45°12′17″N 20°22′32″E
- Country: Serbia
- Province: Vojvodina
- District: Central Banat
- Municipalities: Zrenjanin
- Elevation: 63 m (207 ft)

Population (2002)
  - Perlez: 3,818
- Time zone: UTC+1 (CET)
  - Summer (DST): UTC+2 (CEST)
- Postal code: 23260
- Area code: +381(0)23
- Car plates: ZR

Perlez (Serbian Cyrillic: Перлез; Hungarian: Perlasz) is a village located in the Zrenjanin municipality, in the Central Banat District of Serbia. It is situated in the Autonomous Province of Vojvodina. The village has a Serb ethnic majority (87.29%) and its population numbering 3,818 people (2002 census).

Famous residents: Milan Ponjević (actor), Stoja Novaković (singer).

== History ==
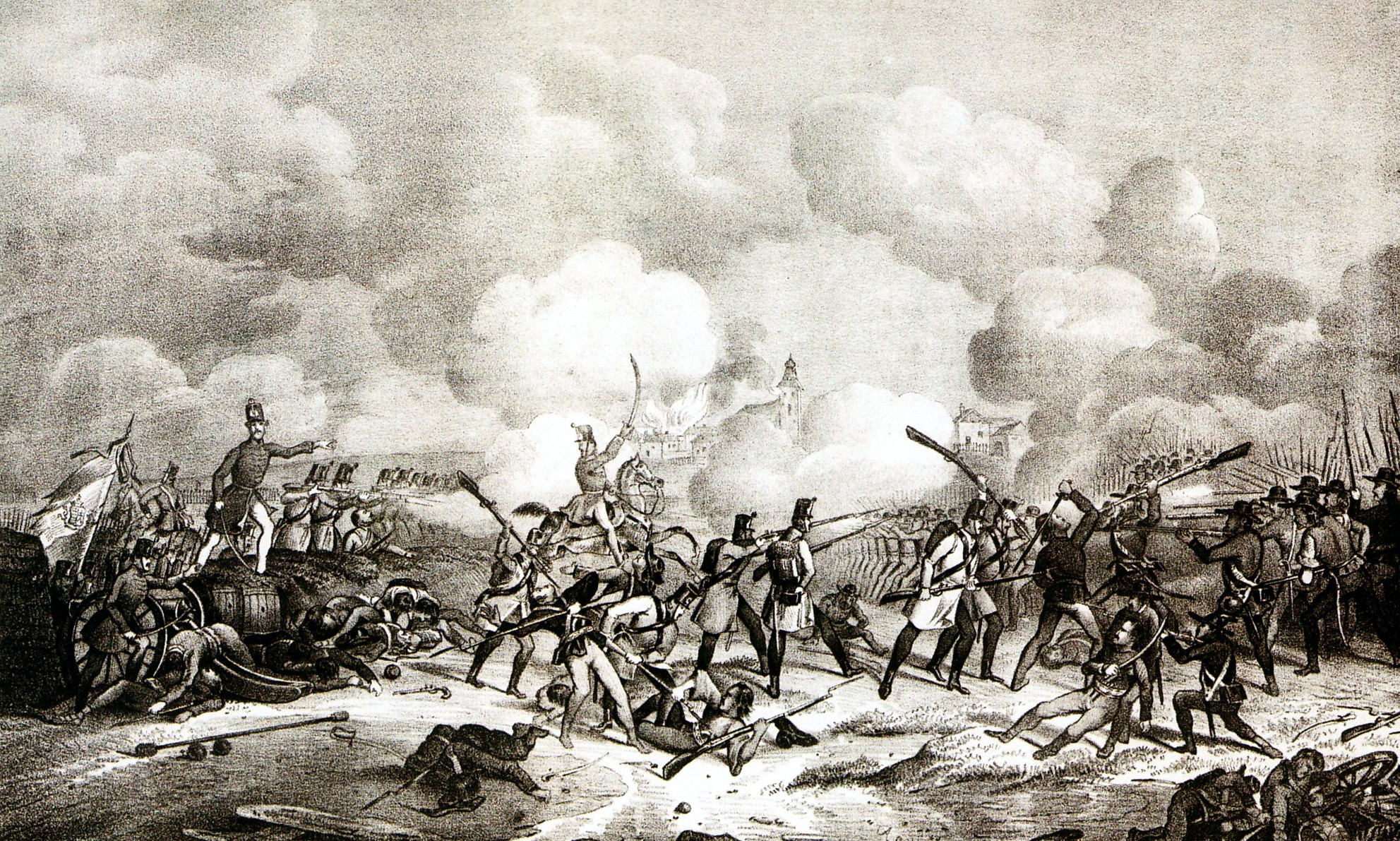
Battle of Perlasz, 1848

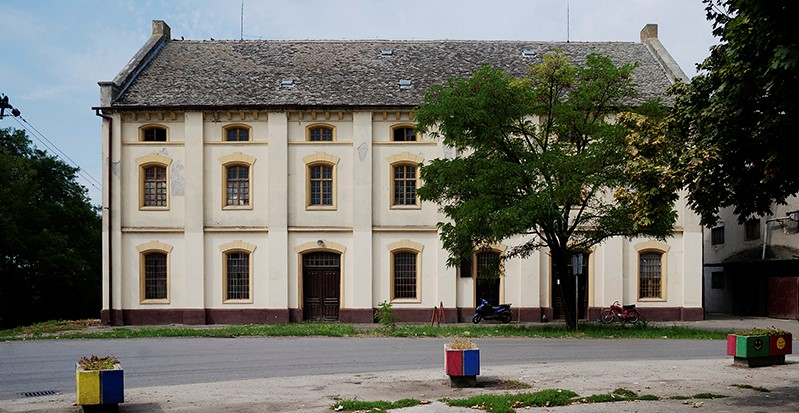
Perlez mill

Baden culture graves and ceramics (bowls, anthropomorphic urns) were found in the village.

The town originally consisted of a hamlet named Siga, next to which a fort called Šanac was built in the early-18th Century. (At the time this was part of the Austrian frontier with the Ottoman Empire.) In 1752, Count Perlas, president the administration of the Banat and treasurer for the province of Timisoara, founded a new village just outside the fort, which he named after himself. Early settlers were Serbs from elsewhere in the region, Germans, Croats, Slovaks and Hungarians, many of whom were employed as border guards.

Following the Treaty of Trianon the region shifted from Hungarian to Yugoslav administration and the town's name was changed to Perlez, accordingly.

=== Population ===
This village had a small community of Croats, that lived in compact part of the village; they have been slowly but evidently in large amounts assimilated. Still, this assimilation has never drawn the attention of Croat parties in Serbia.

- 1961: 4,881
- 1971: 4,458
- 1981: 4,283
- 1991: 3,880

== Economy ==
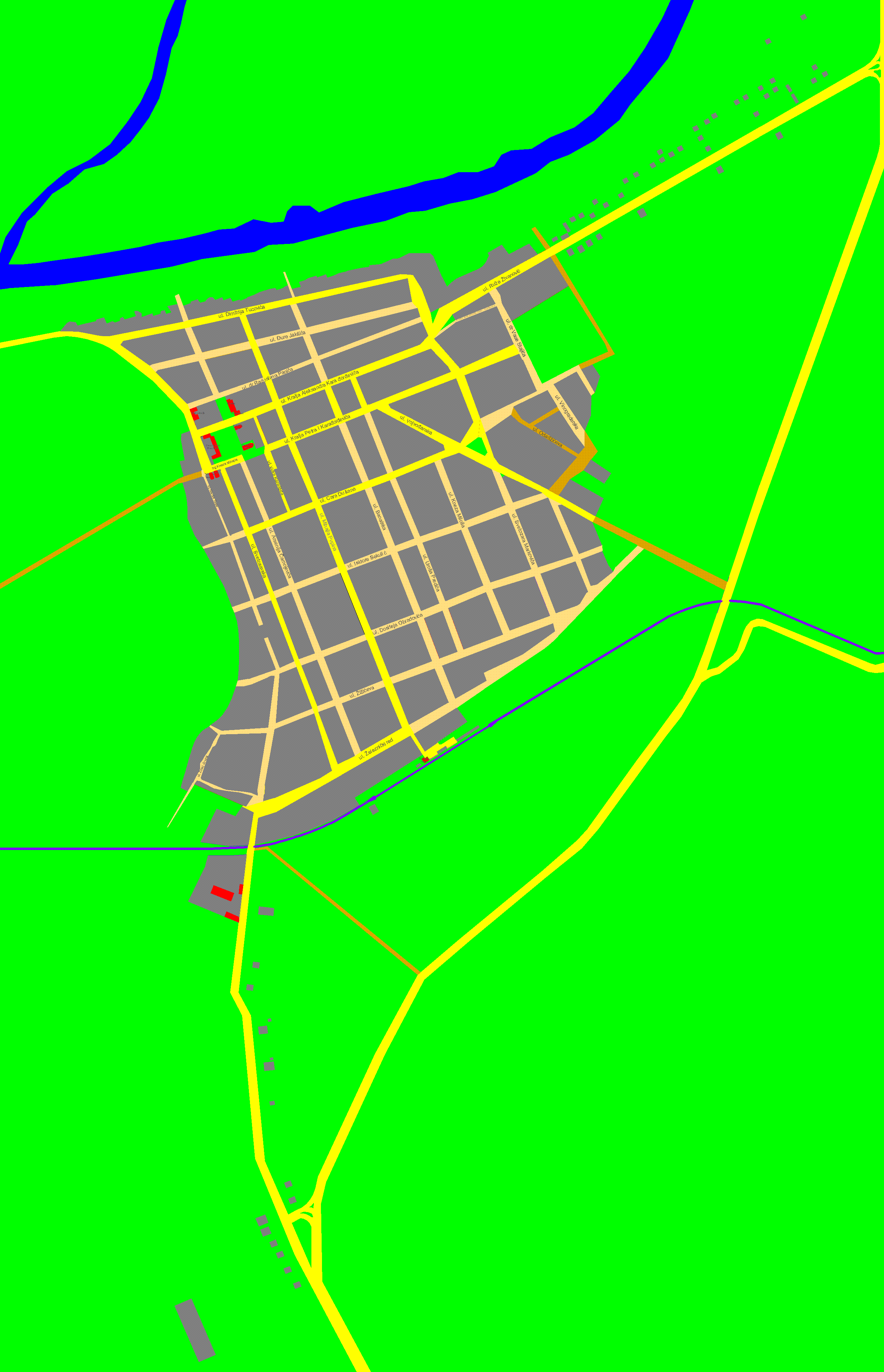
Perlez Map

The "Matić farm", located near the confluence of the Bega into the Tisza, preserves the old and autochthonous breeds of cattle. It has a small herd of the Podolian cattle and since the mid 2000s, the herd of domesticated water buffalo was formed. Buffalos, descendants of the river buffalo, arrived in the modern Vojvodina region in the 5th century with the Huns. Historical records show that they were still being kept in the 15th century, but died out from the region later.

== See also ==
- List of places in Serbia
- List of cities, towns and villages in Vojvodina
