= Second siege of Szenttamás =

First battle of the Hungarian War of Independence 1848

Coordinates: 45°32′48.7″N 19°47′58.4″E

- Part of the Hungarian Revolution of 1848
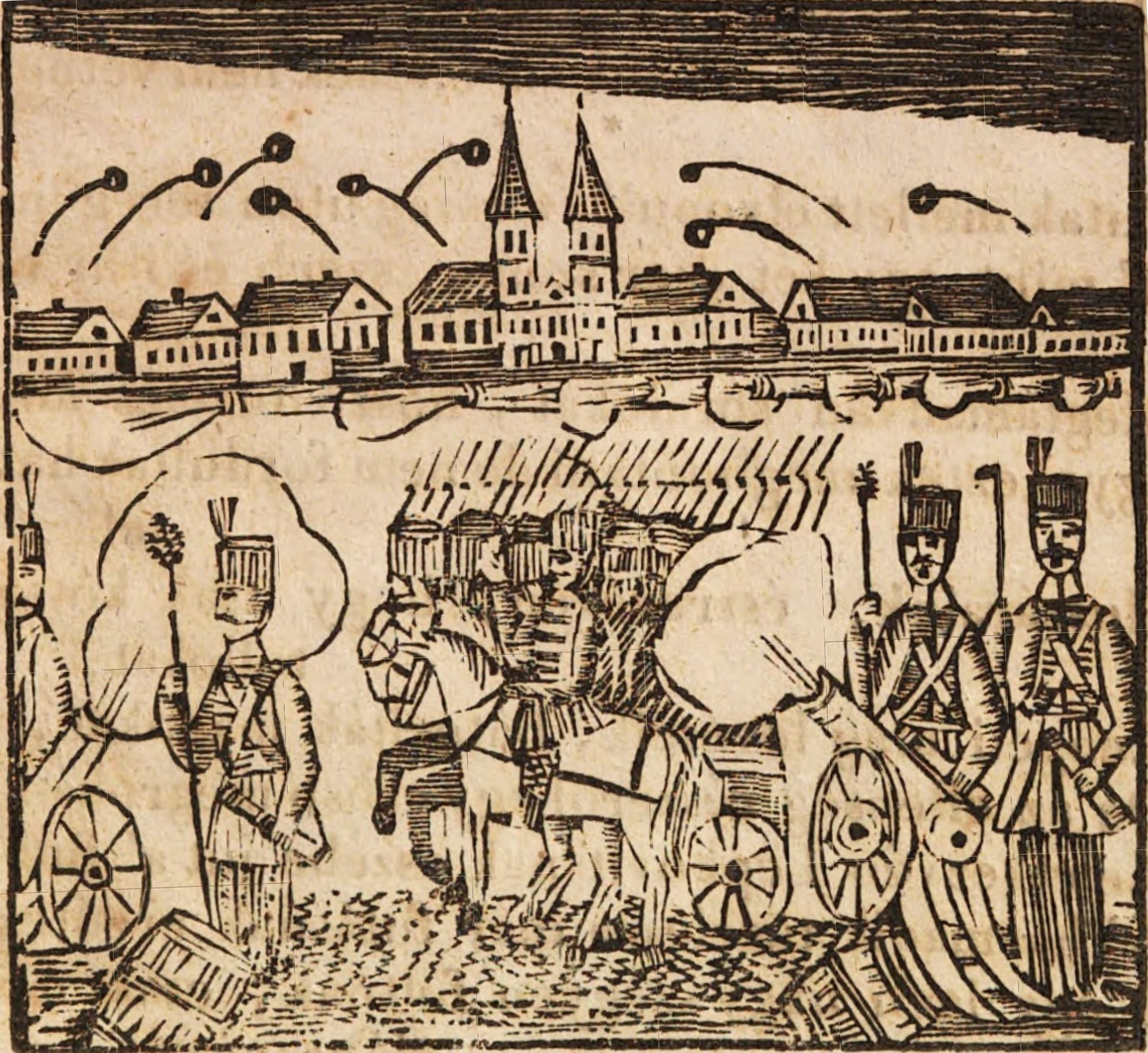
- Siege of Szenttamás (engraving)
Date	19 August 1848
Location	Szenttamás, Bács-Bodrog County, Kingdom of Hungary (today Srbobran, Serbia)
Result	Serbian victory

Belligerents
Hungarian Revolutionary Army	Austrian Empire: Serbian Vojvodina

Commanders and leaders
Fülöp Bechtold	Petar Biga

Strength
16,000 men 32 cannons	3,530 (6,000–7,000) men 20 cannons

Casualties and losses
40 (200) dead 100 wounded	?

The second siege of Szenttamás (now Srbobran, in the South Bačka District, Vojvodina, Serbia) was an attempt of siege during the Hungarian War of Independence of 1848-1849, as a part of the Serb uprising of 1848–49, on 19 August 1848, carried out by the Hungarian Army under the command of Lieutenant General Fülöp Bechtold against the Serbian fortified encampment in Szenttamás and Turia held by the Serb insurgents led by Captain Petar Biga. The Hungarians did not keep in secret their plan to attack, so the Serbs prepared the defense. The second cause of the failure of the siege was the errors in communication between the commandment and the leaders of the brigades, and the wrong placement of the troops. This victory gave morale to the Serbians to continue and widen their revolt.

== Background ==
Lieutenant General Bechtold's reports about the failure at the first siege of Szenttamás from 14 July 1848, prompted the government to do everything possible to resolve all the problems, which they thought were preventing the crushing of the Serb uprising from Southern Hungary. Thus, in early August, the government ordered all the troops it could spare to the camp at Óbecse, and in order to enable the taking of all the necessary measures for achieving the victory, the Minister of War, Lázár Mészáros visited the camp in person.

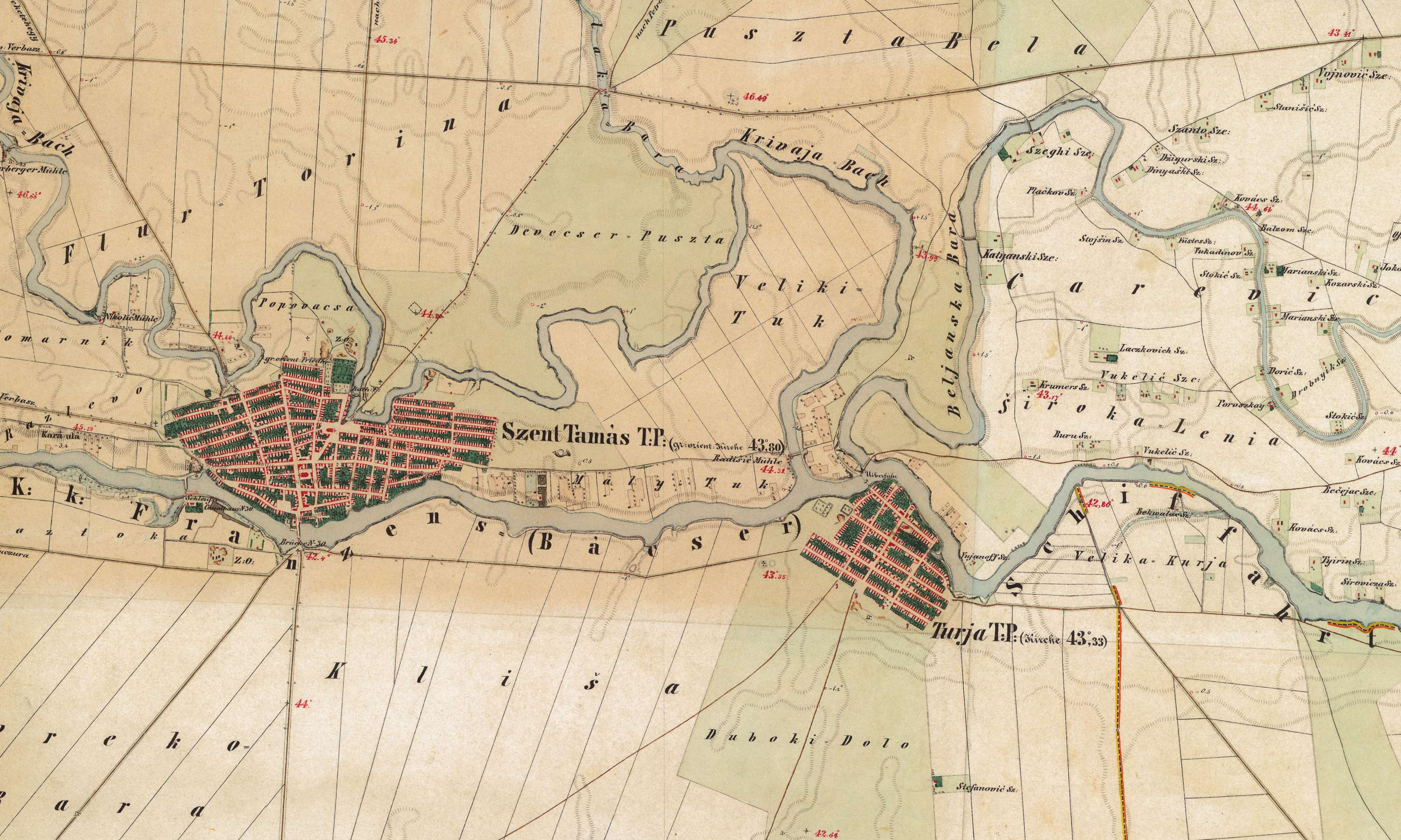
Szenttamás - Srbobran and Turia at the middle of the 19th century

In August the Hungarian troops were stationed in Óbecse, Verbász, Kiskér, Ókér, Járek and Temerin. On 17 August, Lieutenant-General Philip Bechtold moved his headquarters from Óbecse to Verbász. To stop the Serbs' attacks, he sent Hungarian battalions, infantry, and cavalry companies, equipped with one battery and sometimes with one or two guns, from one place to another, to help the Hungarian villages and town threatened by the sudden Serbian attacks.

Following the experience of the siege of Szenttamás from 14 July, the Hungarian command sought to deploy the majority of its troops to the west and south of Szenttamás.

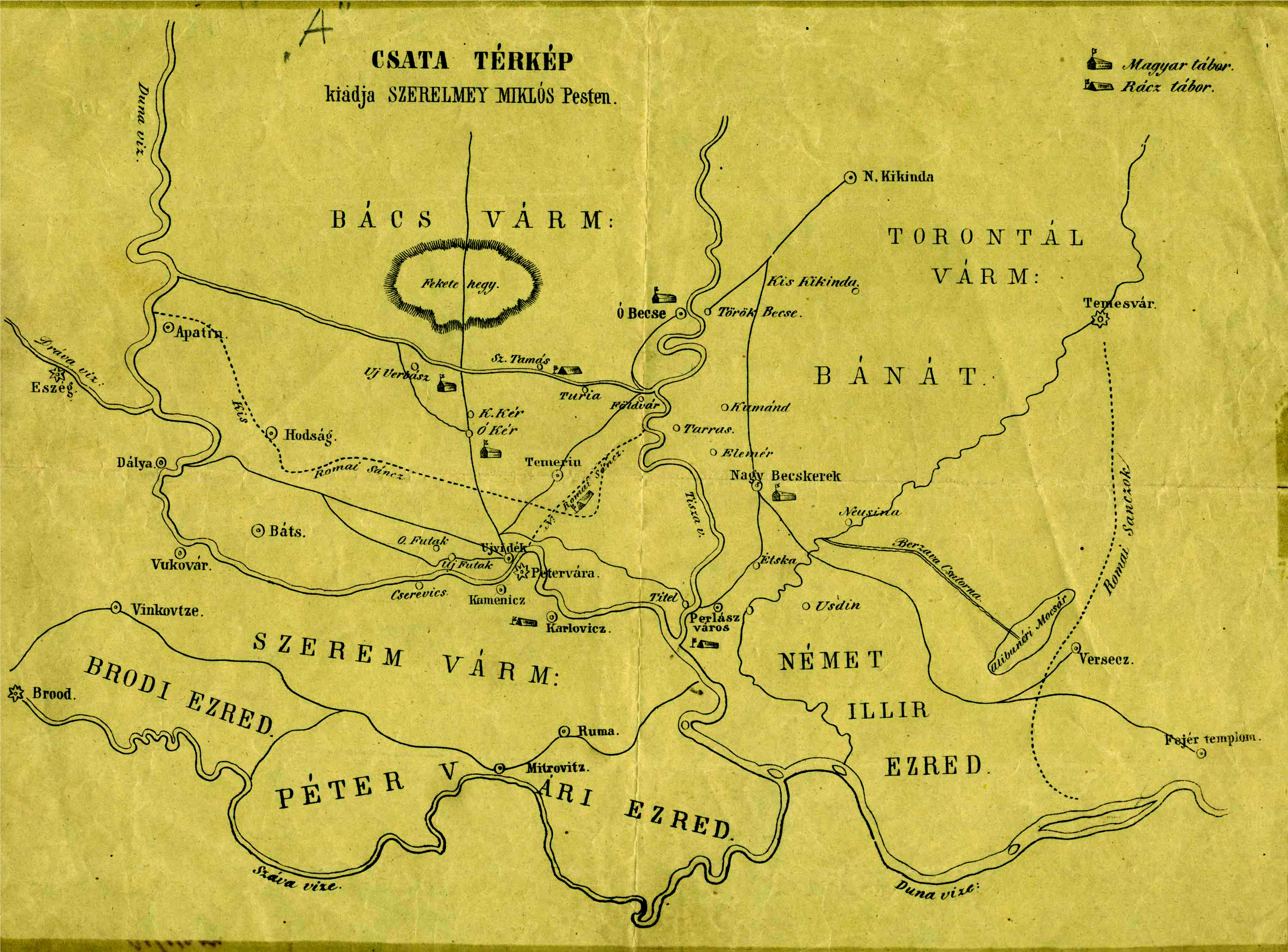
The War Theater in Southern Hungary in 1849. Dotted line: The Roman trenches

By mid-August, the following Hungarian forces had been gathered in the Bácska region. In Verbász: one battalion from each of the Gyulay, Prussian King, Wasa, Schwarzenberg, and the Székely border regiments, 3 battalions from each of the Imperial, Alexander, and Honvéd regiments, making in total 11 infantry battalions in all, 9 companies in all from the Imperial, Ferdinand, and Württemberg Hussars: 2 twelve-pounder, 3 six-pounder, 1 cavalry batteries and 2 mortars. At Temerin: one Wasa, one Este, one Honvéd infantry battalions, 4 Imperial Hussar companies, and 1 1/2 six-pounder batteries. In Óbecse: 1 Franz-Karl, 1 Wasa, 2 Honvéd, and 1 Pest volunteer battalions, 4 Ferdinand Hussar companies, and a six-pounder battery. In total, there were 19 infantry battalions, 17 cavalry companies, 8 1/2 batteries, and 2 mortars at the three stations, with about 15,000 soldiers. In addition to these regular troops, there were at least the same number of national guardsmen at each station, so the total number of the Hungarian troops in Bácska must have been at least 30,000-35,000, which in any case represented a considerable force, and so the government was indeed justified in urging Bechtold to launch a decisive and forceful attack.

The Serbs did not stand idly either when the Hungarians were gathering forces, they even surpassed the Hungarians in the increasing of their forces, but especially in the proactive training of their troops. While the offensive preparations were being made, the Serbian commander-in-chief, Đorđe Stratimirović, with his troops transported with light carts, made large-scale raids on Verbász on 1 and 3 August, but both were unsuccessful and the attack against Járek on 10 August ended in a similar manner.

At Szenttamás and Turia, the defensive earthworks were augmented, the garrison was increased to 6,000-7,000 men, and small and large cannons were placed in the entrenchments. In the large Roman ramparts (Note: defensive works from the ancient times, stretching between the Danube and the Tisza from Apatin to Bácsföldvár, used very successfully by the Serbs against the Hungarians during the 1848-1849 revolutionary war) there were 15,000 men, and in reserve at Karlóca, Cserevics, and Kameniec were 10,000 men. They had no cavalry, but they were amply supplied with artillery. In total, the Serbs had 26,000-32,000 armed men in Bácska.

== Prelude ==
At the urging of the Hungarian government, Lieutenant General Bechtold set the siege of Szenttamás for August 19; but in the same way as before the siege of 14 July, this time also they did not keep secret of it, and naturally, the Serbs were informed of it.

=== Opposing forces ===
Serbian defenders

On August 18, the distant troops of the 2nd Battalion of the Pétervárad Border Guard Regiment, under the command of Captain Petar Biga, entered Szenttamás. Biga took over the command from Lieutenant Teodor Bosnić and divided the troops for the defense as it follows:

The Pétervárad bridgehead: there were 1 company of Pétervárad border guards under the command of Gavrilo Živanović, 250 armed inhabitants of Szenttamás, 2 guns. According to historian Mihály Horváth, the Polish Pan-Slavist Wnorowski defended it with about 1,500 troops, several hundred Servians (volunteers from the Principality of Serbia), and 4 cannons. A part of these troops, which could not fit in the bridgehead, remained in reserve across the waters of the Ferenc Canal on the outskirts of the town and at the entrances to certain streets.

The Verbász main trenches: under the command of Captain Petar Biga there were 2 1/2 companies of the Pétervárad border guard regiment, 400 armed inhabitants of Szenttamás, and 5 guns.

On the Bácsfeketehegy bridge, under National Guards Captain Novak Dunđerski there were 1/2 company of Pétervárad border guards, 150 armed inhabitants of Szenttamás, and 5 guns.

The Óbecse entrenchments (Srbobran): under the command of Büyük Pasha, Toma, and Stanko, 500 Servians, 300 armed inhabitants of Mohol and Óbecse, and 2 guns.

Eastern exit (Praedium Tuk): under Hadžić Senior 300 armed inhabitants of Szenttamás and 2 guns.

In Turia: under the command of Lieutenant General Petar Jovanović, 200 border guard infantry troops of Pétervárad, 30 Servians, 600 armed inhabitants of Turia, and 4 3-pounder guns.

In the "Na Sirigu" (Szőreg Manor) entrenchment, National Guard officer Marko Nikolić was in command. The artillery was provided by the Šajkaši. Thus the total defensive garrison was around 3,530 men and 20 guns. Other figures put the Serbian garrison at 6-7,000 men.

Hungarian army

On 18 August, Lieutenant-General Bechtold sent General Wollenhofer with 4 infantry battalions, Lenkey's Würtenberg's Hussars company, and the two 12-pound batteries to Kiskér with the aim of marching from there the following day against the Pétervárad bridgehead.

On 19 August the Hungarian attacking columns were composed as follows:

The Bakonyi brigade - marched from Verbász. It was composed of 2 battalions of the Alexander (formerly Bakonyi) infantry regiment, 1 battalion of the Gyula (33rd Infantry Regiment) regiment, 1 battalion of the King of Prussia infantry regiment, and 2 battalions of the Pest National Guards. The cavalry was composed of the Imperial Hussars, while the artillery of a half 6-pound battery with 3 guns, and a half 12-pound battery with 3 guns as well.

The Wollenhofer Brigade - marched out from Kiskér: It was composed of 1 battalion of the Alexander infantry Regiment, 1 infantry battalion of the Székely border guard regiment, 2 battalions of Honvéd infantry, 1 infantry battalion of the Veszprém national guards, 1 battalion of the Pest volunteer infantry, 1 company of Würtemberg hussars, a half 6-pounder battery with 3 guns, one and a half 12-pounder batteries with 9 guns, two 30-pounder mortars.

Colonel Fack's group: 2 battalions of the Kunság National Guards, 1 battalion of the Bácska National Guard, 3 companies of the Kunság cavalry.

Kollowrat (Castiglione) brigade - it departed from Temerin and Óbecse. It was composed of 1 battalion of the Schwarzenberg infantry regiment, 2nd battalion of the Wasa infantry regiment, 1 battalion of the Honvéd infantry, 1 battalion Pest volunteer infantry, 1 squadron of the Ferdinand hussars, and two 6-pound cavalry batteries with 12 guns.

To keep an eye on the Bácsfeletehegy road and Srbobran, 1 battalion of Tolna National Guard infantry and 1 squadron (Ferdinand or Imperial?) of hussars were assigned.

Thus, the number of attacking Hungarian troops was 7 Hungarian Line regimental battalions of 150 men in each company, a total of around 5000 soldiers, 3 Honvéd battalions of circa 200 men in each company, a total of around 3000 soldiers, 8 Hungarian National Guard battalions of 200 men in each company, a total of around 5,000 men, altogether 16,000 men.

A Hussar company numbered around 100 cavalrymen, the National Guard cavalry companies 120, but the number of cavalry companies present at the siege is not known. The artillery carried 5 batteries with 30 guns and 2 mortars.

In order to maintain communication with Pétervárad and to keep an eye on the Serbian troops stationed in the Roman entrenchments, some of the line and national guard troops were left at Óbecse, Temerin, and Futak.

=== Deployment of the Hungarian troops for the battle ===
Sending the National Guards from the troops assigned to Szenttamás to assault entrenchments was a difficult task. Because they were not fully trained soldiers, they could not be counted on in the siege. Surely, they would have been better used in garrison service behind entrenchments. The cavalry was only suitable for reconnaissance service, for charging and pursuing the enemy in the open field.

Consequently, only infantry troops and artillery from the line regiments and the Honvéds could take part in siege operations.

Each brigade as an assault column left its station early in the morning of the 19th of August. The Bakony brigade started from Óverbász and moved along the left bank of the Ferenc Canal, against the Verbász main trenches (called like this because they were in the direction of Verbász). The Wollenhofer brigade was directed from Verbász to Kiskér at 3 o'clock in the afternoon of the 18th, where it arrived at 7 o'clock in the evening; from Kiskér it departed towards Szenttamás at 12 o'clock in the night to attack the Pétervárad bridgehead and on the way it had to fight many difficulties, passing through wet and boggy ground until it reached its destination. The Ferdinand hussars and probably the Tolna National Guardsmen were sent from Óbecse to Szenttamás to watch Srbobran (the battlements of Óbecse) and the road to Bácsfeketehegy.

The southern group of the Kollowrat Brigade under the command of Colonel Castiglione (1 battalion of the Schwarzenberg infantry regiment, 1 battalion of the Wasa infantry, 1 squadron of the Ferdinand Hussar Regiment, and 2 cavalry batteries) left Temerin on 18 August. They spent the night at the Szöreg farm, while the Serbs from the "Na Sirigu" redoubt had retreated earlier. At dawn on the 19th, they continued their way to Turia. At the same time, 1 Honvéd battalion and 1 battalion of volunteers from Pest were sent to Turia from Óbecs.

Each of the three brigades, when they arrived at their destination after they deployed their artillery, immediately started firing against the entrenchments.

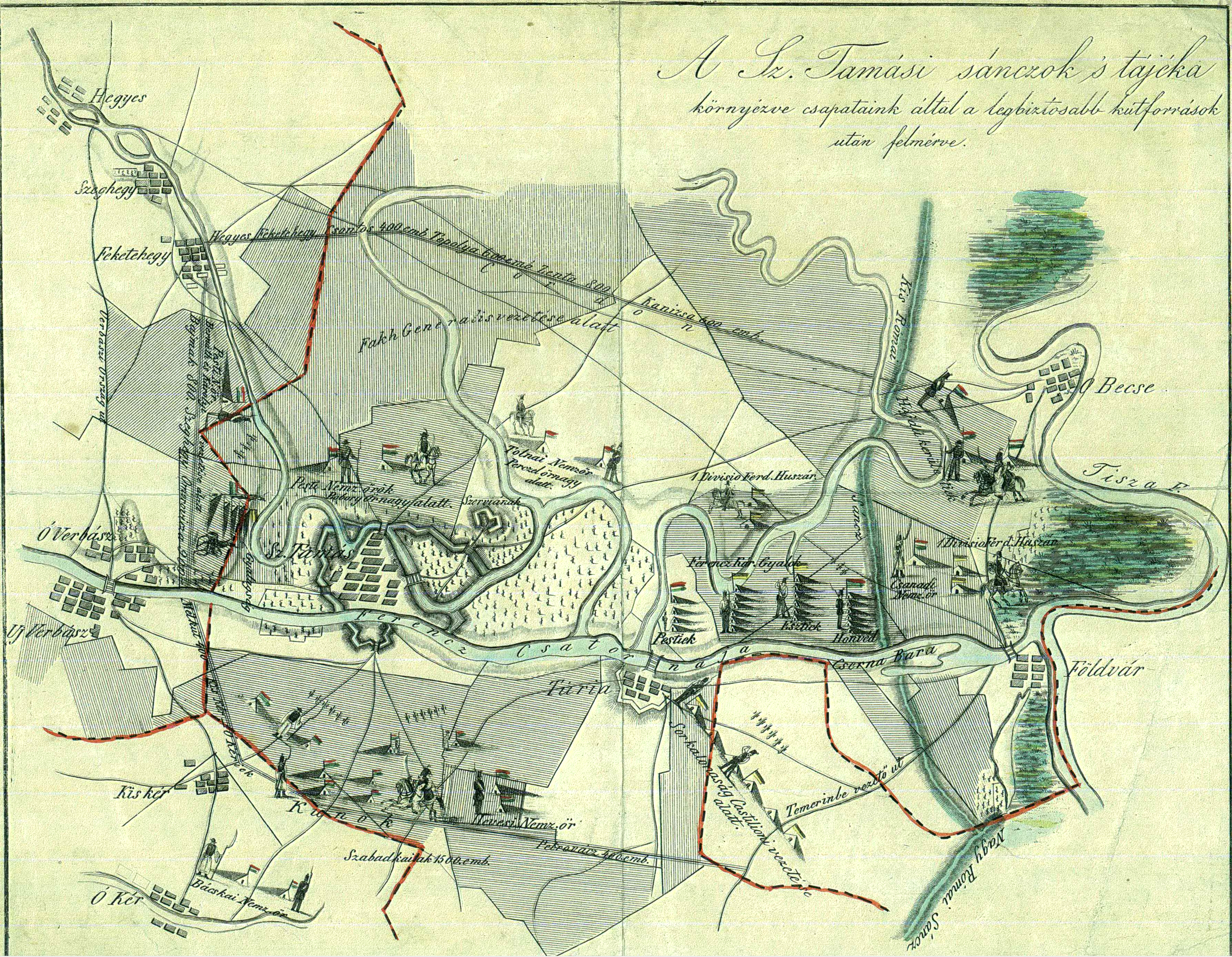
Szenttamás with the surroundings, military encampments and troops in the summer of 1848

Wollenhofer ordered the Székely battalion to the vanguard. Its flank approached the Pétervárad bridgehead at 600 paces. The brigade's batteries then advanced in a semi-circle on the west side of the Kiskér-Szenttamás road, with their right flank leaning on the road, deploying at a distance of 800-900 paces from the flank in front of the bridgehead - with the two 30-pound mortar guns on the left, and with the 6-pounder half battery and the 12-pounder 1 1/2 batteries on the right.

To the left of the artillery, initially, about 1000 paces from the bridgehead, stood the 1st battalion of the Székely Border Guards Regiment, with its left flank near the small woods. Behind the right flank of this battalion, towards the road to Kiskér, the two Honvéd battalions had to stand in the second line of battle while in the third line stood Colonel Fack's National Guard troops (2 battalions of Kunság, 1 National Guard battalion from Bácska and finally 3 companies of the mounted National Guards of Kunság.

In the first line, on the eastern side of the road to Kiskér, also 1000 paces from the bridgehead, the 1st battalion of the Alexander infantry regiment was deployed. Behind this, in the second line, were 1 battalion of the Pest Volunteer National Guards and 1 battalion of the Veszprém National Guards, and finally the Würtemberg Hussars.

The purpose of this group here on the right flank was to keep watch towards the Roman ramparts so that no aid would be received by the Serbs from there.

The artillery of the Bakony Brigade, a half 6-pounder, and half 12-pounder batteries with a total of 6 guns, with the 12-pounder on the northern side of the road, deployed on the two sides of the Verbász-Szenttamás road, approached the entrenchments to 800-900 paces. To the left of the artillery, were 2 battalions of the Alexander Infantry Regiment leaning their left flank on the Krivaya river, while the Bakony infantry was right to the artillery, facing the Ferenc Canal. The 2 battalions of the Pest National Guards were behind the Alexander Infantry, the Imperial Hussars were further back behind the artillery, and finally the Pest National Guard Cavalry was behind the Bakony Infantry.

On the road to Bácsfeketehegy, as the extreme left wing, deployed on the other bank of the Krivaja, were deployed on the first line the Tolna National Guards, and in the second line the Ferdinand Hussars. The purpose of this group was to watch the Serbs, and to warn the Bakony Brigade if the enemy broke out on the corn-covered terrain and prevent them to get into the rear of the Bakony Brigade on the Óbecse-Óverbász road, and also to observe the Óbecse entrenchments.

At Turia, the 2 cavalry batteries of the Kollowrat brigade were deployed to the south of the village, opposite the ramparts. It is likely that the hussar squadron were positioned to the right and rear of the artillery (to observe Nádalj and the Roman ramparts), while the infantry was deployed to the left of the artillery.

The 1st battalion of the Schwarzenberg infantry regiment represented the actual assault column in the first line. The 5th squadron (the 9th - 10th companies) of the Wasa regiment's 2nd battalion advanced as a support group, the 4th squadron (the 7th - 8th companies) advanced as a reserve in the third line, while a Honvéd battalion and a Pest volunteer battalion deployed north of Turia.

== Siege ==
The artillery of the Wollenhoffer Brigade eliminated the Serbian guns in the Pétervárad bridgehead, and caused considerable damage also to the entrenchment. If the brigade then would have started a rigorous attack, no doubt, they would have taken the bridgehead. This was admitted also by the enemy. but they could not attack, because Bechtold ordered a halt to the fight. This happened around 10 o'clock in the morning, and as a result, the fighting was over here. Bechtold probably gave this order because the other columns were not yet close enough to engage the enemy in the fight. It is possible that Wolnhoffer misunderstood the order, because he stopped further operations altogether, which, as we will see below, gave Wnorowski the opportunity to rush with the greater part of his troops to the aid of his comrades threatened by the enemy from the direction of Verbász.

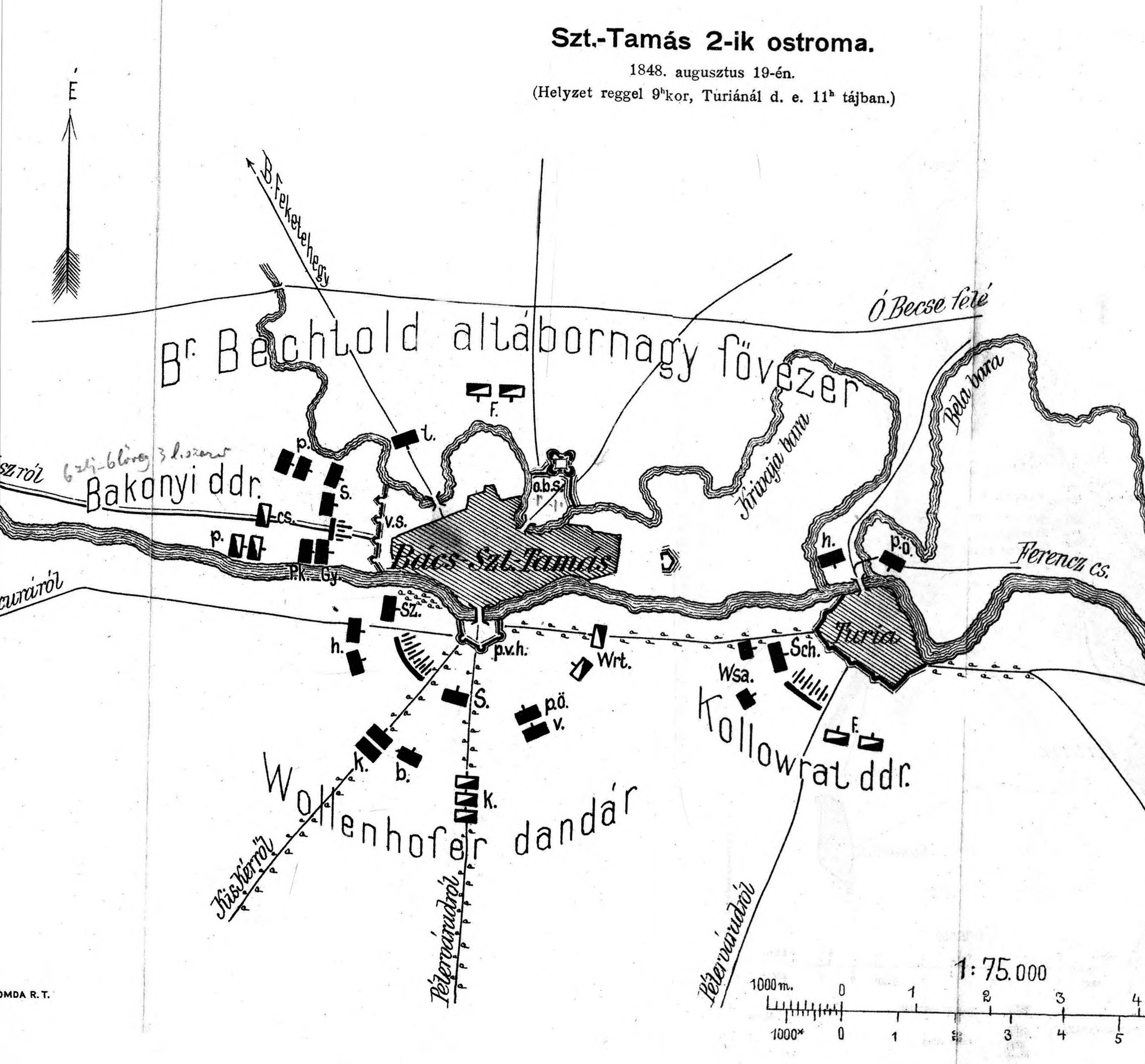
Second siege of Szenttamás (19 August 1848) b. = Bácska volunteers cs. = imperial hussars F. = Ferdinand Hussars Gy. = Gyula battalion h. = Honvéd battalion k. = Kunság national guards o.b.s = Óbecse trenches p. = Pest national guards p.ö. = Pest volunteers P.k. = Prussian king infantry p.v.h. = Pétervárad bridgehead S. = Alexander infantry Schw. = Schwarzenberg infantry sz. = Székely battalion t. = Tolna national guards v. = Veszprém national guards v.s. = Verbász trenches Wrt. = Württemberg hussars Wsa. = Wasa battalion

The Bakonyi column, which had meanwhile deployed, attacked the so-called Verbász entrenchments, which stretched out between the canal and the marshes, towards the western side of the city, where Biga and Bosnić commanded 4,000-5,000 insurgents, consisting of the Pétervárad and Šajkaši border guards and Servians, and positioned them a few hundred paces in front of the entrenchments. These Serbs were pushed back into the entrenchments, after a fierce infantry fight, by the Bakonyi brigade. Afterwards, when the fighting against the bridgehead ceased, Bakonyi asked Wollenhofer for a 12-pound battery. This battery was set up on the right bank of the Ferenc Canal in such a way that its shells whipped out the Serb soldiers along the inner side of the Verbas ramparts, whose ramparts were yet incomplete or perhaps not even built at that time. The devastating fire of the 12-pound battery forced the Serbs to retreat from the entrenchments.

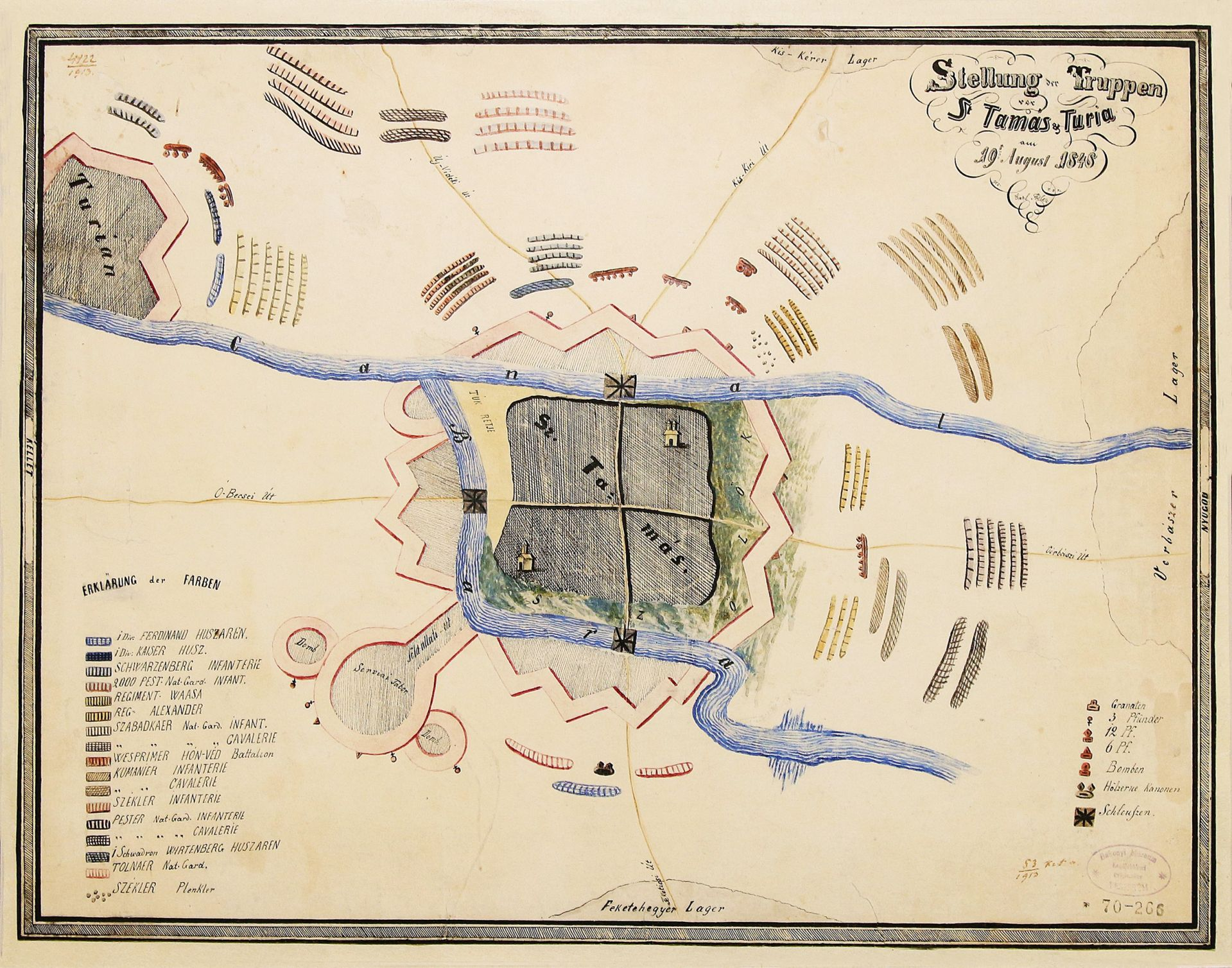
Siege of Szenttamás of 19 August 1849 (the image is upside down, left to right)

The troops of the Bakony Brigade, attacking from Verbász, then climbed on the battlements. On the left flank of the Bakony Brigade, the Alexander infantry seized this opportunity to storm the ramparts at Krivaja. A fierce fight developed between the Hungarians and the Serbs. A significant number of the Alexander infantry regiment climbed the battlements. But they did not receive any support. There was a lack of consistency in the battle plans of the besieging troops, a lack of vigor in the leadership, and a lack of determination and resolve to achieve the goal.

The 2nd battalion of the Pest National Guards, which was in reserve behind the Alexander infantry, instead of pushing forward, retreated to the rear. While on the right flank of the Bakony Brigade, the infantry remained inactive.

Meanwhile, the defenders were reinforced by Wnorowski's troops and pushed back the Bakony brigade. The Wollenhofer Brigade retreated, and it was probably at this time that the Tolna National Guardsmen ran away from the fire of their Serbian guns in the direction of the Bácsfeketehegy road. The natural consequence of this was that the Serbs not only poured from the bridgehead and the trenches of Óbecse (which, from the start of the battle, was not a target of the Hungarian attacks) to the Verbász entrenchments, driving back the Alexander infantry.

Wnorowszki, a Pole who fought alongside the Serbs and served in the general staff, showed exceptional vigor and agility in the using of the artillery. On the hilly terrain south of the western exit of Szenttamás, he positioned several large caliber guns behind the defensive wall, turning them against the Hungarian 12-pounder battery operating on the southern bank of the Ferenc Canal to counter its firing.

The guns of the Bakony Brigade were firing at the Verbász entrenchments until noon because Bechtold sent the order to retreat here a few hours later than to Wollenhofer.

The Bakony Brigade withdrew at about 1 p.m. Lieutenant Colonel Lajos Aulich with the Sándor infantry and Major János Lenkey with the Bakony infantry, covered the retreat in a respectful manner.

The artillery of the Kollowrat brigade attacking at Turia silenced the Serb guns, but the infantry charge collapsed under fire from the Serb defenders, who were shooting at them from the trenches and the attics of the houses.

Naturally, only 2 battalions of the Schwarzenberg and Wasa infantry could be involved, because the Honvéd battalion and the battalion of the Pest volunteers could not cross the Ferenc Canal after the Serbs picked up the only bridge over it. This shows that the deployment of these two infantry squadrons north of Turia was pointless and incomprehensible.

Kollowrat then put his guns into action, and the village was hit until 4 p.m. Several houses were destroyed and most of the village burnt down.

At this time, the defenders of Szenttamás, relieved after the Hungarian attack had failed, came to the aid of the besieged Turia, and forced Kollowrat's brigade to retreat to Kiskér. The Pest volunteer battalion and the Honvéd battalion retreated to their previous position.

The 3rd Wasa Battalion arrived at Óbecse on the Tisza River early in the morning of 19 August. The battalion, under the command of Major Müller, was to go immediately to support the troops fighting at Turia. What caused the battalion's delay is not known, but before it arrived at its destination, the siege of Turia was interrupted. As a result, the battalion returned to Óbecse.

It is noteworthy that at the same time as the siege of Szenttamás and Turia, a Hungarian troop attacked Tiszaföldvár, defended by the Serbs led by a certain Bernavorac.

During the siege of Szenttamás, the cannons shot for 7 hours along the Tisza. At the same time, at Tarras, Hungarian troops - probably from the Nagybecskerek camp - tried to cross the Tisza by boat to demonstrate against Csurog, in order to tie up the Serbs from there. This attempt had no serious consequences. Allegedly one of the Hungarian boats was shot down and sank. When the siege of Szenttamás was lifted, the attempts to cross the river also ceased.

== Aftermath ==
According to official figures, the fighting cost the Hungarians 40 dead and a hundred or so wounded, but the rumors concerning the battle, put the death toll at 200, which is perhaps more likely than the official figure.

In mid-August, out of the 26,000-28,000 troops, organized in of 10 line regiment and 6 Honvéd battalions, 17 Hussar companies, 8 1/2 batteries (51 guns) and 2 mortars at Lieutenant General Bechtold's disposal, only 8 line regiment and 3 Honvéd battalions took part in the siege of Szenttamás – not counting the 3rd Wasa Battalion, which arrived too late on the battlefield. From his batteries only 5 artillery batteries were used. The cavalry and national guards were sufficient. But these could only be used as observers and reserves, or to pursue the enemy in case of its defeat.

More than a third of the troops under Bechtold's command were diverted from their proper purpose and were used for garrison and communications between the garrisons. It is also incomprehensible that Bechtold, despite the successful artillery attack of the Wollenhofer brigade, withdrew the brigade instead of attacking.

A reliable general reserve was not assured, with which the high command could have intervened decisively here or there, and as a result, the Alexander infantry was forced to give up the advantages gained with a great shed of blood. The troops besieging Turia would have been just the right reserve here, while, during the siege of Szenttamás, Turia would be kept in check with smaller forces, followed by an attack against it after the success at the main theater.

Neither of the two columns attacking Turia was strong enough to succeed alone. But they were separated by the Ferenc Canal. Thus, if one of the attacking columns was beaten, the other could not come to its aid. In this way, the attack against Turia was totally pointess and had no chance of success.

So the second siege of Szenttamás had failed, and this gave this place a myth of impregnability.

Encouraged by this positive result, the leader of the rebels, Đorđe Stratimirović, launched new attacks against the Hungarian positions. On 26 August, he made three simultaneous attempts in three directions, towards Ókér, Temerin, and Járek, which were, however, thwarted by the Hussar Colonel Máté, who was in command in this area, until finally, on August 29, Stratimirović managed to make his way towards Pétervárad, which isolated this Hungarian fortress from the rest of the Hungarian held territories.

== Sources ==
- Bánlaky, József (2001). A magyar nemzet hadtörténelme ("The Military History of the Hungarian Nation) (in Hungarian). Budapest: Arcanum Adatbázis.
- Bóna, Gábor (1987). Tábornokok és törzstisztek a szabadságharcban 1848–49 ("Generals and Staff Officers in the War of Freedom 1848–1849") (in Hungarian). Budapest: Zrínyi Katonai Kiadó. p. 430. ISBN 963-326-343-3.
- Hermann, Róbert (2001), 1848-1849 a szabadságharc hadtörténete ("Military History of 1848-1849") (in Hungarian), Budapest: Korona, ISBN 963-9376-21-3
- Hermann, Róbert (2004). Az 1848–1849-es szabadságharc nagy csatái ("Great battles of the Hungarian Revolution of 1848-1849") (in Hungarian). Budapest: Zrínyi. p. 408. ISBN 963-327-367-6.
- Olchváry, Ödön (1999). A magyar függetlenségi harc 1848-1849-ben a Délvidéken (in Hungarian). Budapest: Márkus Samu Könyvnyomdája.
