= Lokve pri Dobrniču =

- Location in Slovenia
- Coordinates: 45°52′35.89″N 14°59′0.14″E
- Country: Slovenia
- Traditional region: Lower Carniola
- Statistical region: Southeast Slovenia
- Municipality: Trebnje

Area
  - Total: 0.56 km^{2} (0.22 sq mi)
- Elevation: 246.8 m (810 ft)

Population (2002)
  - Total: 19

Lokve pri Dobrniču (pronounced [ˈlɔːkʋɛ pɾi ˈdoːbəɾnitʃu]) is a small settlement immediately east of Dobrnič in the Municipality of Trebnje in eastern Slovenia. The area is part of the traditional region of Lower Carniola. The Municipality of Trebnje is now included in the Southeast Slovenia Statistical Region.

== Name ==
The name of the settlement was changed from Lokve to Lokve pri Dobrniču in 1955.
