= Spodnje Pirniče =

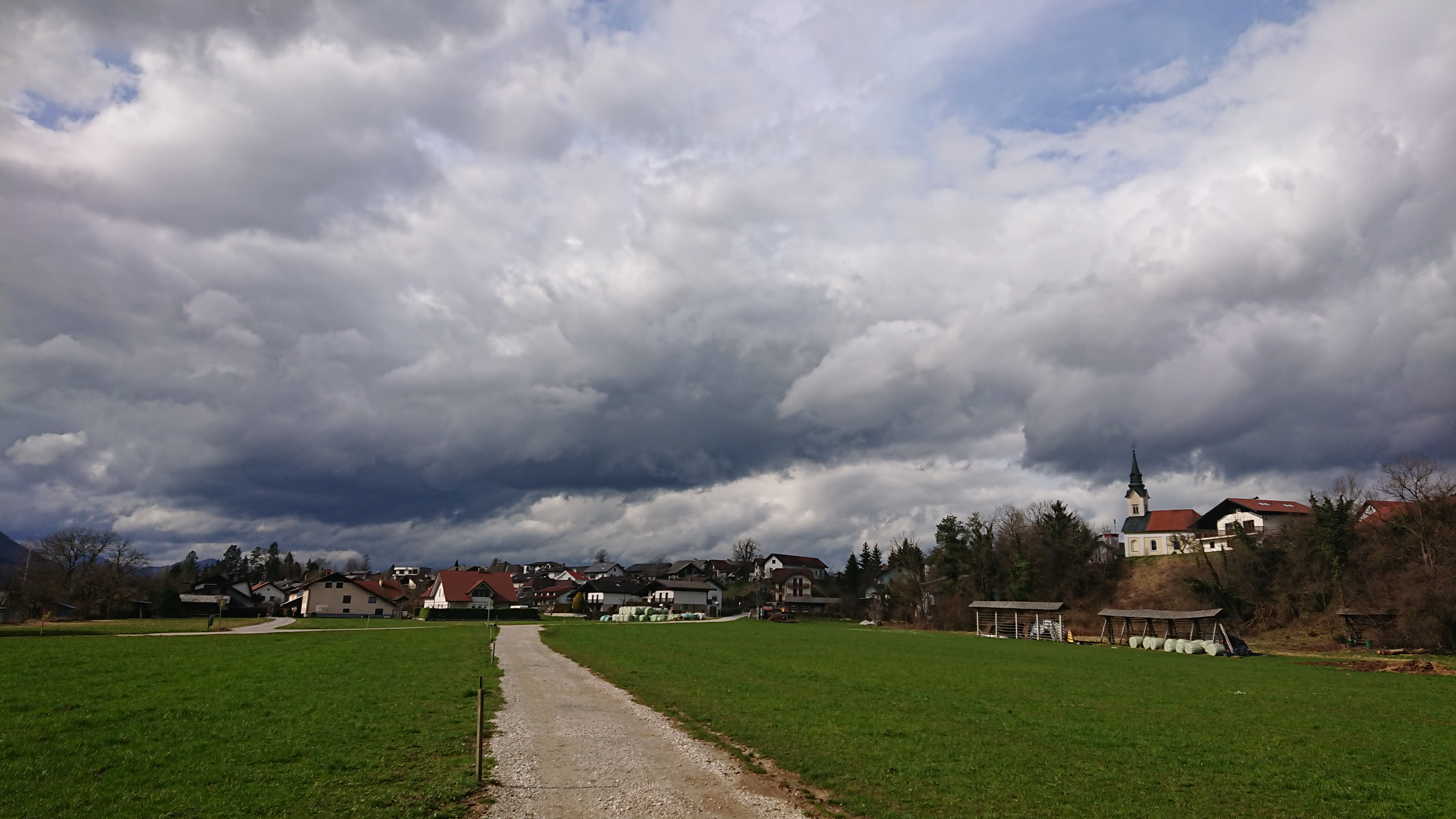

- Location in Slovenia
- Coordinates: 46°8′7.72″N 14°26′16.01″E
- Country: Slovenia
- Traditional region: Upper Carniola
- Statistical region: Central Slovenia
- Municipality: Medvode

Area
  - Total: 1.5 km^{2} (0.58 sq mi)
- Elevation: 332.3 m (1,090 ft)

Population (2002)
  - Total: 724

Spodnje Pirniče (pronounced [ˈspoːdnjɛ ˈpiːɾnitʃɛ]; German: Unterpirnitsch) is a village on the left bank of the Sava River in the Municipality of Medvode in the Upper Carniola region of Slovenia.

== Name ==
Spodnje Pirniče (literally, 'Lower Pirniče') and neighboring Zgornje Pirniče (literally, 'Upper Pirniče') were attested in written sources in 1392 as Pernekk (and as Pernek in 1394 and utrumque Bernh in an 18th-century copy of a document from 1118). The original form of the name may be reconstructed as the plural demonym *Pyrьničane, ultimately derived from the common noun *pyro 'spelt', referring to a local cultivar and meaning 'people living where spelt is grown'. Another possibility is that the name developed from a plural demonym derived from the Old High German name Ber(i)nhard or the Middle High German name Pern(a)hart.

== Church ==
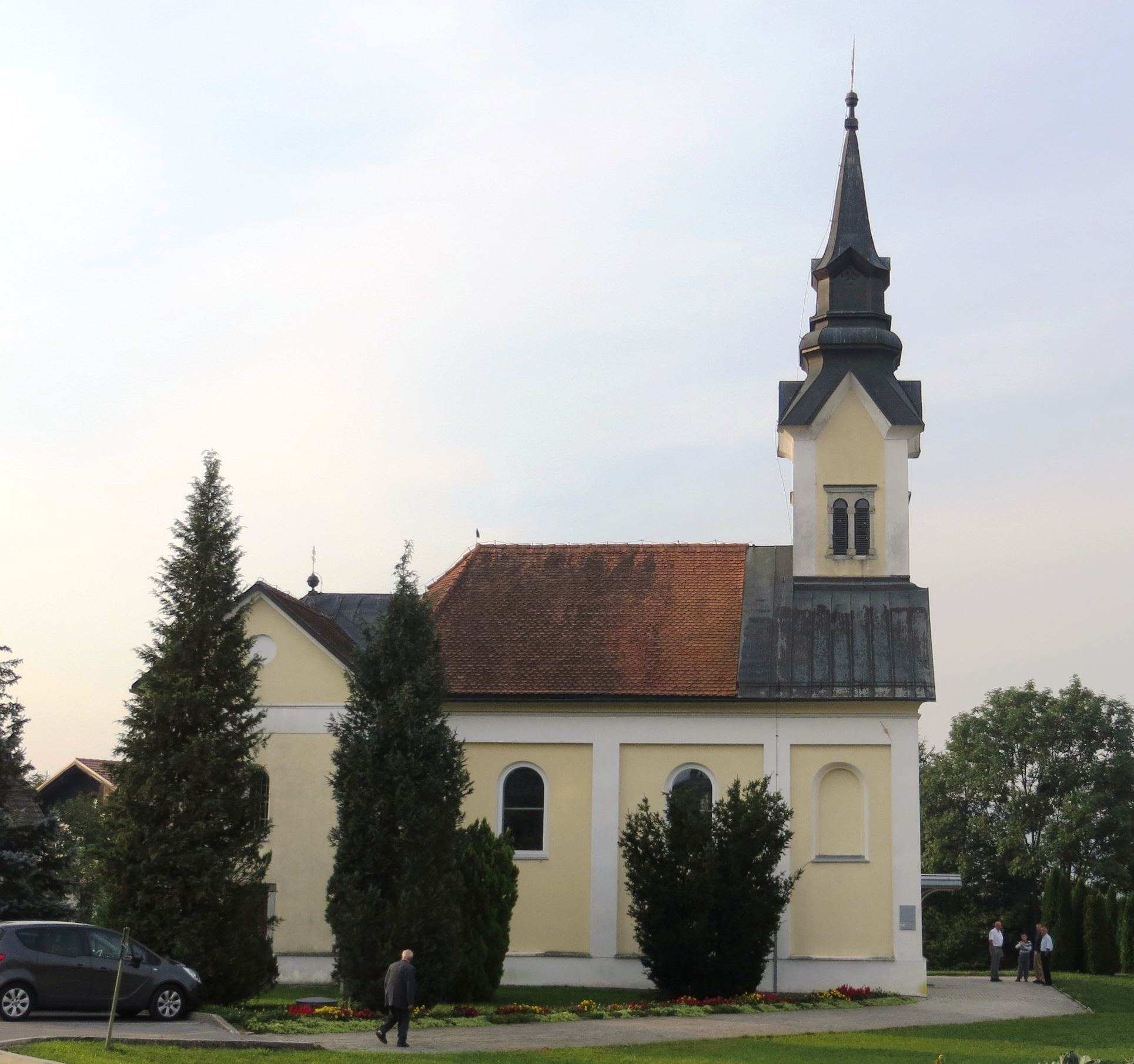
Holy Cross Church

The local church is dedicated to the Feast of the Holy Cross.

== Notable residents ==
- Franc Rozman
