= Zgornje Pirniče =

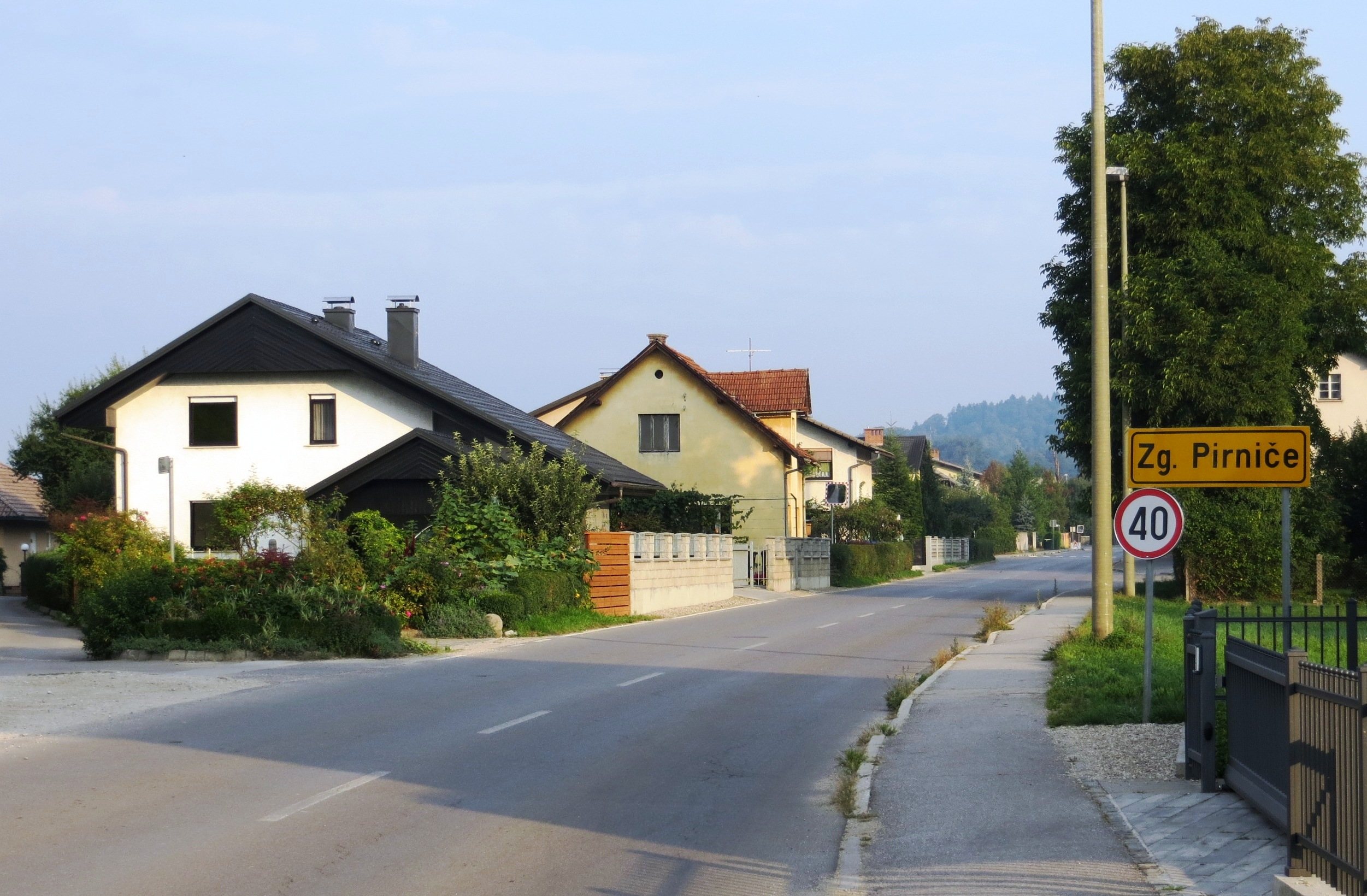

- Location in Slovenia
- Coordinates: 46°8′28.95″N 14°25′45.98″E
- Country: Slovenia
- Traditional region: Upper Carniola
- Statistical region: Central Slovenia
- Municipality: Medvode

Area
  - Total: 2.76 km^{2} (1.07 sq mi)
- Elevation: 339.8 m (1,115 ft)

Population (2002)
  - Total: 1,163

Zgornje Pirniče (pronounced [ˈzɡoːɾnjɛ ˈpiːɾnitʃɛ]; German: Oberpirnitsch) is a settlement in the Municipality of Medvode in the Upper Carniola region of Slovenia.

== Name ==
Zgornje Pirniče (literally, 'Upper Pirniče') and neighboring Spodnje Pirniče (literally, 'Lower Pirniče') were attested in written sources in 1392 as Pernekk (and as Pernek in 1394 and utrumque Bernh in an 18th-century copy of a document from 1118). The original form of the name may be reconstructed as the plural demonym *Pyrьničane, ultimately derived from the common noun *pyro 'spelt', referring to a local cultivar and meaning 'people living where spelt is grown'. Another possibility is that the name developed from a plural demonym derived from the Old High German name Ber(i)nhard or the Middle High German name Pern(a)hart.

== Church ==
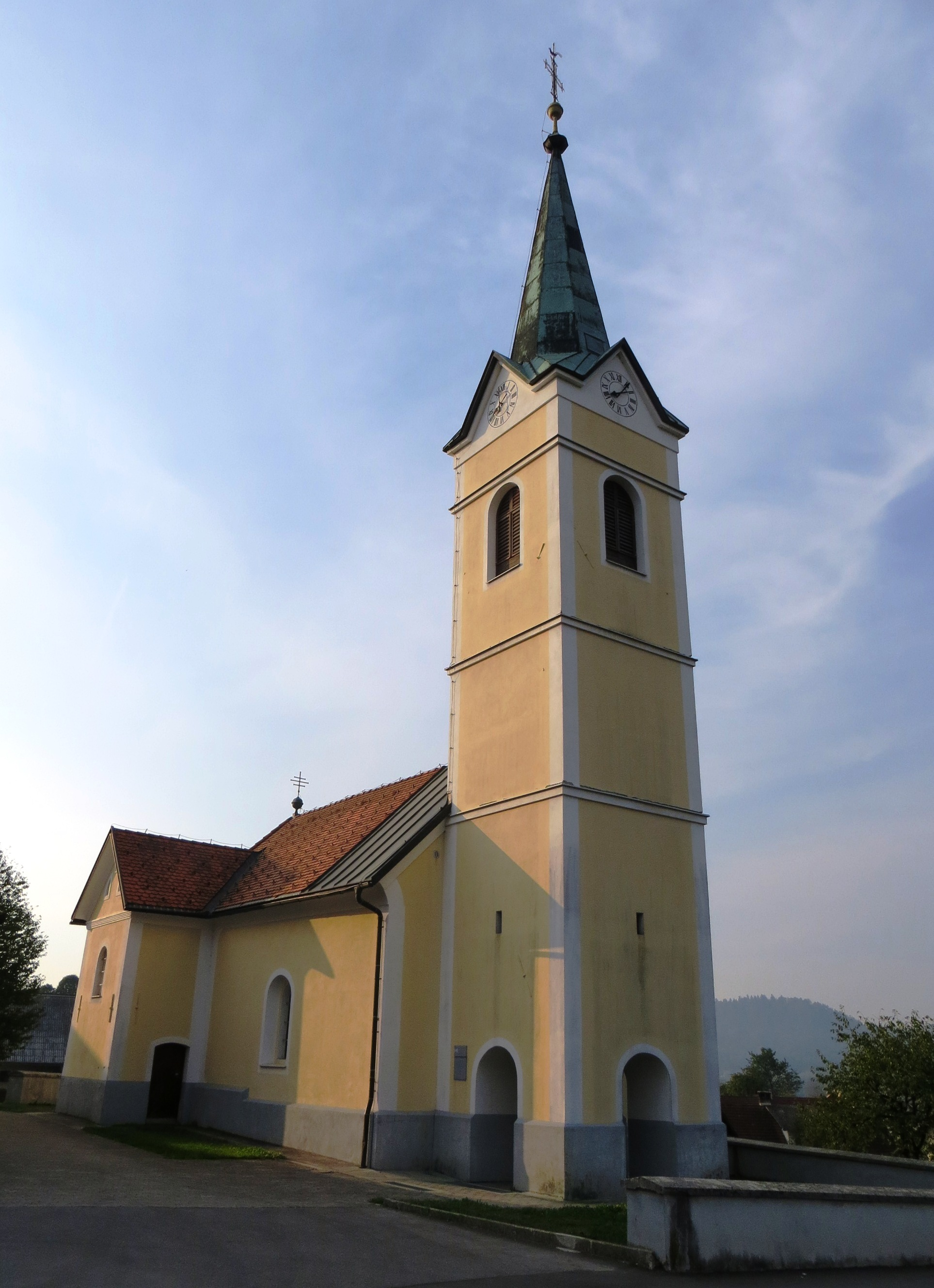
St. Thomas's Church

The parish church in the settlement was built in 1990 and is dedicated to the Assumption of Mary. There is also a chapel of ease in the village dedicated to Saint Thomas the Apostle. It has a late-Gothic chancel and a Baroque nave and bell tower.
