= Lukšije =

Lukšije Лукшије
- Village
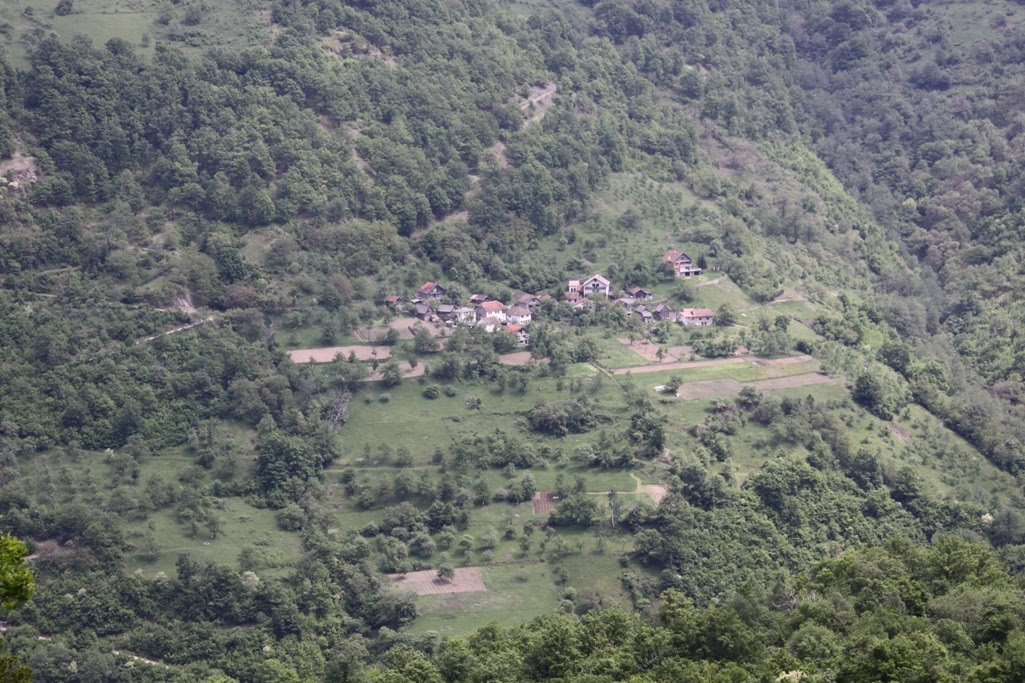

- Location within Bosnia and Herzegovina
- Coordinates: 43°47′N 17°49′E
- Country: Bosnia and Herzegovina
- Entity: Federation of Bosnia and Herzegovina
- Canton: Herzegovina-Neretva
- Municipality: Konjic

Area
  - Total: 0.30 sq mi (0.77 km^{2})

Population (2013)
  - Total: 22
  - Density: 74/sq mi (29/km^{2})
- Time zone: UTC+1 (CET)
  - Summer (DST): UTC+2 (CEST)

Lukšije (Cyrillic: Лукшије) is a village in the municipality of Konjic, Bosnia and Herzegovina.

== Demographics ==
According to the 2013 census, its population was 22.

Ethnicity in 2013
Ethnicity	Number	Percentage
Bosniaks	13	59.1%
Croats	9	40.9%
Total	22	100%
