= Lokva, Serbia =

Lokva Локва
- Village
- Location within Serbia
- Coordinates: 43°34′39″N 22°19′36″E
- Country: Serbia
- District: Zaječar District
- Municipality: Knjaževac

Population (2002)
  - Total: 69
- Time zone: UTC+1 (CET)
  - Summer (DST): UTC+2 (CEST)

Lokva (Serbian: Локва) is a village in the municipality of Knjaževac, Serbia. According to the 2002 census, the village has a population of 69 people.
