= Mihajlovo =

Mihajlovo Михајлово (Serbian) Magyarszentmihály (Hungarian)
- Village (Selo)
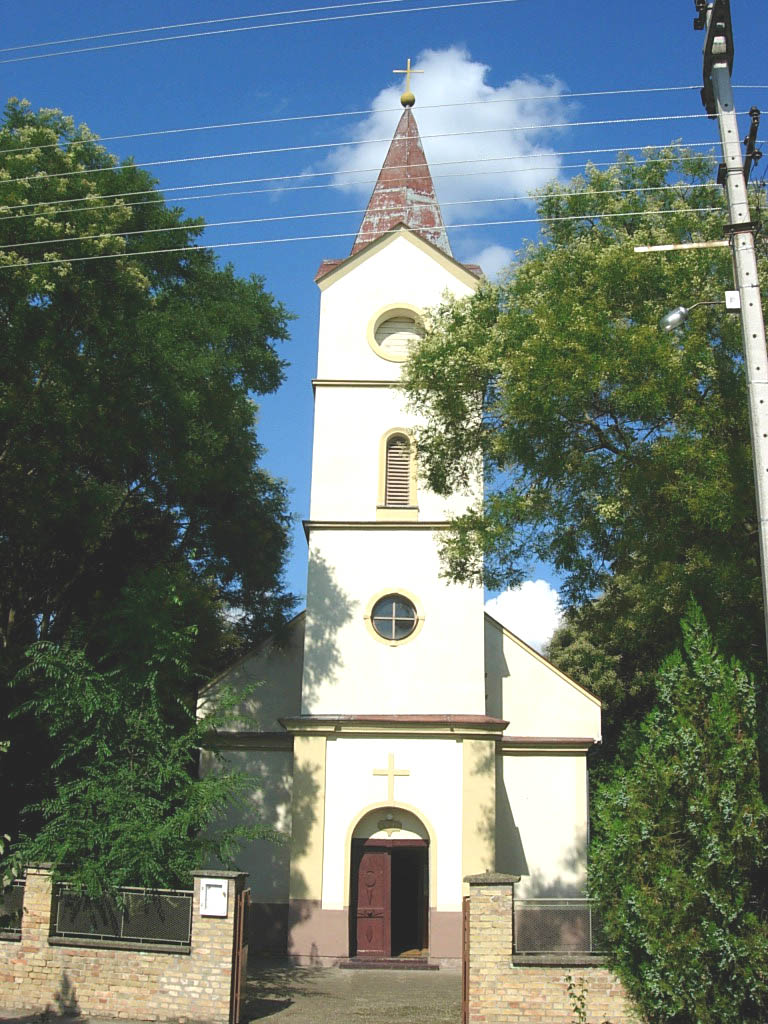
- Saint Michael the Archangel Catholic Church.

- Location within Serbia Mihajlovo (Serbia) Mihajlovo (Europe)
- Coordinates: 45°28′08″N 20°24′31″E
- Country: Serbia
- Province: Vojvodina
- District: Central Banat
- Municipalities: Zrenjanin
- Elevation: 70 m (230 ft)

Population (2002)
  - Mihajlovo: 1,004
- Time zone: UTC+1 (CET)
  - Summer (DST): UTC+2 (CEST)
- Postal code: 23202
- Area code: +381(0)23
- Car plates: ZR

Mihajlovo (Serbian Cyrillic: Михајлово, Hungarian: Magyarszentmihály) is a village in Serbia. It is located in the Zrenjanin municipality, in the Central Banat District, Vojvodina province. The village has a Hungarian ethnic majority (94.02%) and its population numbers 1,004 people (2002 census).

== Historical population ==
- 1961: 1,409
- 1971: 1,252
- 1981: 1,318
- 1991: 1,169

== See also ==
- List of places in Serbia
- List of cities, towns and villages in Vojvodina
