= Lokve, Črnomelj =

Lokve
- Location in Slovenia
- Coordinates: 45°35′47.32″N 15°10′28.88″E
- Country: Slovenia
- Traditional region: White Carniola
- Statistical region: Southeast Slovenija
- Municipality: Črnomelj

Area
  - Total: 2.97 km^{2} (1.15 sq mi)
- Elevation: 175.9 m (577 ft)

Population (2020)
  - Total: 544
  - Density: 183/km^{2} (474/sq mi)
- Postal code: 8340

Lokve (pronounced [ˈlɔːkʋe]) is a settlement north of Črnomelj in the White Carniola area of southeastern Slovenia. The area is part of the traditional region of Lower Carniola and is now included in the Southeast Slovenia Statistical Region.
