= Bačko Gradište =

Bačko Gradište Бачко Градиште (Serbian) Bácsföldvár (Hungarian)
- Village (Selo)
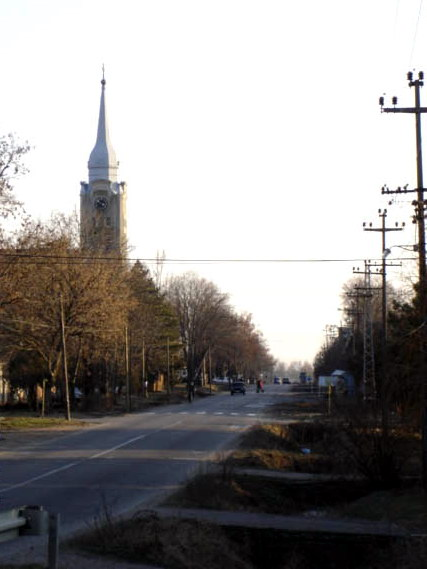
- Main street with Catholic church in Bačko Gradište

- Location within Vojvodina Location within Serbia Location within Europe
- Coordinates: 45°32′N 20°2′E
- Country: Serbia
- Province: Vojvodina
- Region: Bačka (Podunavlje)
- District: South Bačka
- Municipality: Bečej

Population (2002)
  - Total: 5,445
- Time zone: UTC+1 (CET)
  - Summer (DST): UTC+2 (CEST)

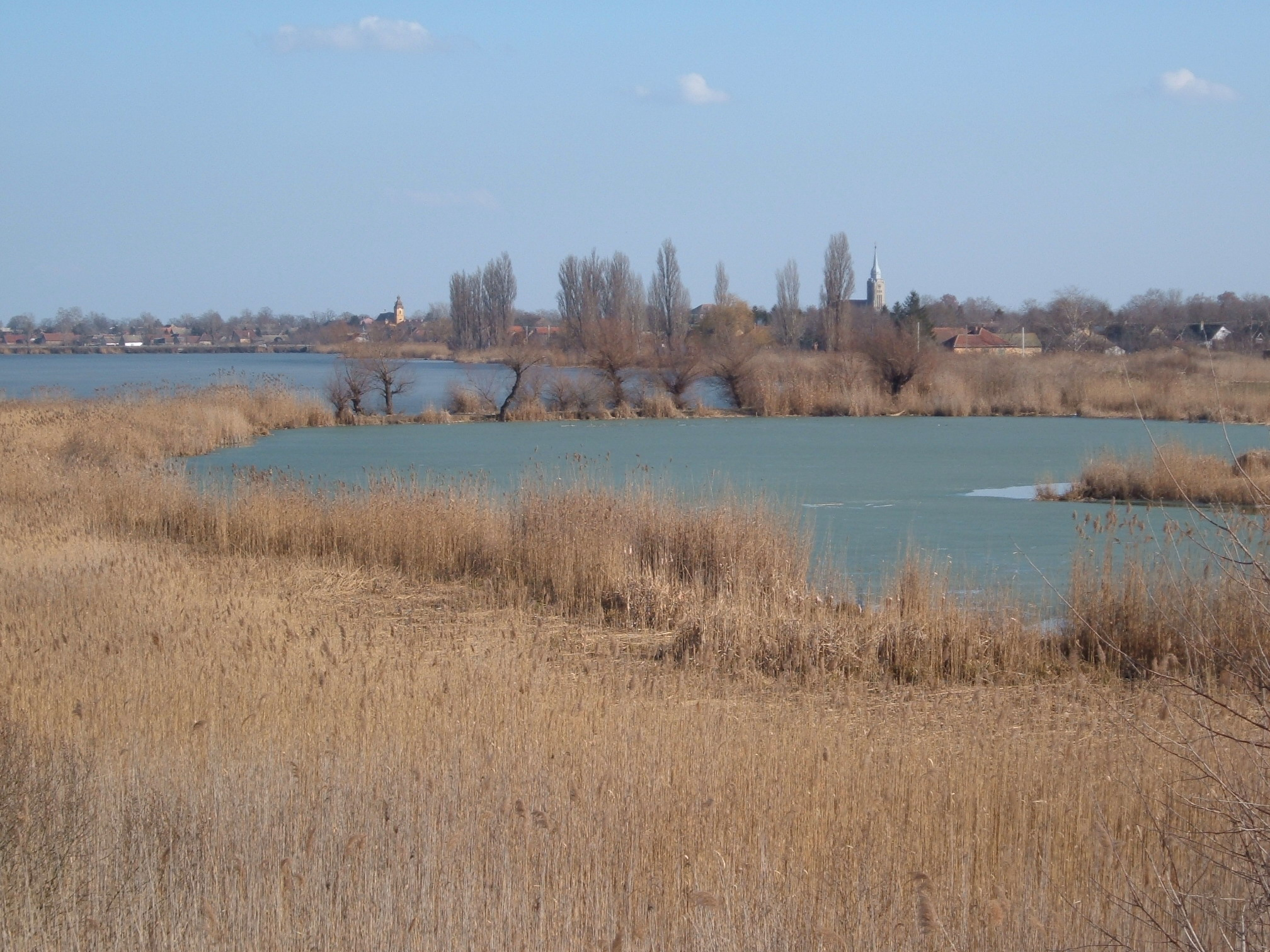
View of Bačko Gradište from the lake

Bačko Gradište (Serbian Cyrillic: Бачко Градиште, pronounced [bâːtʃkɔː ɡrâdiːʃtɛ]; Hungarian: Bácsföldvár, pronounced [ˈbaːt͡ʃføldvaːr]; German: Feldwar in der Batschau) is a village located in the Bečej municipality, in the South Bačka District of Serbia. It is situated in the Autonomous Province of Vojvodina. The village is ethnically mixed and its population numbers 5,445 people (2002 census). Largest ethnic groups in the village are Hungarians (46.26%) and Serbs (44.39%). Linguistically the village has a Slavophonic plurality as Serbs, Yugoslavs, Croats, Montenegrins and ethnic Muslims collectively compose 49.35% of the population. In early 2007, the village was, among others, affected by the measles outbreak that attracted WHO attention.

== History ==
Former Serbian name of this village was Feldvarac (Фелдварац). Historical sources from 1316 mentioned several settlements with name Feldvarac, but it is not sure which one of those could be identified with modern village. However, documents show that Serbs lived there before, during and after Ottoman rule.

The oldest and most reliable mention of place is from 1387 when it was part of the feudal lands of the Gorjanski family. In 1440, it belonged to the Serbian despot Đurađ Branković.

In 1519, there were, according to a 1925 article by ethnographer Borivoje Drobnjaković twelve Serbian households. By 1580, the number had decreased to four.

After the Ottoman forces left, Bačko Gradište became part of Tisa military border district. According to Habsburg census from 1720, this village was populated exclusively by Serbs, while in 1910 there were 1,390 houses with 6,922 inhabitants—3,934 Hungarians; 2,890 Serbs; and 98 Jews. In 1921, the population was 7,007 with a Hungarian majority.

== Ethnic groups (2002 census) ==
The population of the village include:

- 2,519 (46.26%) Hungarians
- 2,417 (44.39%) Serbs
- 151 (2.77%) Yugoslavs
- 67 (1.23%) Croats
- 51 (0.94%) Roma
- 40 (0.74%) Montenegrins
- 12 (0.22%) ethnic Muslims
- others

== Historical population ==
- 1961: 6,106
- 1971: 5,986
- 1981: 5,764
- 1991: 5,625

== Tourism ==
Bačko Gradište is popular because of its Oxbow lake. There is a settlement of holiday houses there without electricity because the town doesn't want it to become an official village. People from Novi Sad, Belgrade, Temerin, Bečej, and Vrbas also have their houses here.

On 1 May there is a huge holiday at the oxbow lake, where even people from neighbouring countries (Hungary) come to enjoy the nature.

== Sports ==
- FC. Vojvodina Bačko Gradište was formed in 1913. This is one of the oldest football clubs in the territory of ex-Yugoslavia. The club hasn’t ceased to exist since 1913. In the year of 2008 the club will celebrate 95 years of constant competing and the team is planning to celebrate it by winning the championship. Today FC. Vojvodina is competing in The Municipal League of Vrbas-Srbobran-Bečej.
- The club has a very good quality pitch, covered stands and very good dressing rooms. It is also planning to open a restaurant near the pitch in 2008.
- The atmosphere in FC. Vojvodina Bačko Gradište is very good. All of the players who played in other clubs have come back in 2007 and they have enhancements from Bečej and Novi Bečej. After every practice and every match the team stays in the restaurant where they enjoy each other's company, where the best scorer has to buy a crate of beer.

== See also ==
- List of places in Serbia
- List of cities, towns and villages in Vojvodina
