= First siege of Szenttamás =

First battle of the Hungarian War of Independence 1848

Coordinates: 45°32′48.7″N 19°47′58.4″E

- Part of the Hungarian Revolution of 1848
Date	14 July 1848
Location	Szenttamás, Bács-Bodrog County, Kingdom of Hungary (today Srbobran, Serbia)
Result	Serbian victory

Belligerents
Hungarian Revolutionary Army	Austrian Empire: Serbian Vojvodina

Commanders and leaders
Fülöp Bechtold	Teodor Bosnić

Strength
3,260 men 17 cannons	5,000 men ? cannons

Casualties and losses
6 dead 17 wounded 8 horses	1 wounded 4 horses

The first siege of Szenttamás (now Srbobran, in the South Bačka District, Vojvodina, Serbia) was an attempt of siege during the Hungarian War of Independence of 1848-1849, as a part of the Serb uprising of 1848–49, on 14 July 1848, carried out by the Hungarian Army under the command of Lieutenant General Fülöp Bechtold against the Serbian fortified encampment in Szenttamás and Turia held by the Serb insurgents led by Teodor Bosnić. The Hungarians did not keep in secret their plan to attack, so the Serbs prepared the defense. The second cause of the failure of the siege was that the Hungarians did not reconnoiter the Serbian fortifications, so they attacked the most heavily fortified positions. This victory gave morale to the Serbians to continue and widen their revolt.

== Background ==
After the unsuccessful Battle of Karlóca, the fighting continued, but at the end of June, another armistice was concluded with the representatives of the Serbian Main Committee (Odbor), which expired on 10 July. The next day the rebels advanced in two columns to attack Versec, but the attack was repulsed by the Hungarian forces, causing heavy losses to the Serbs.

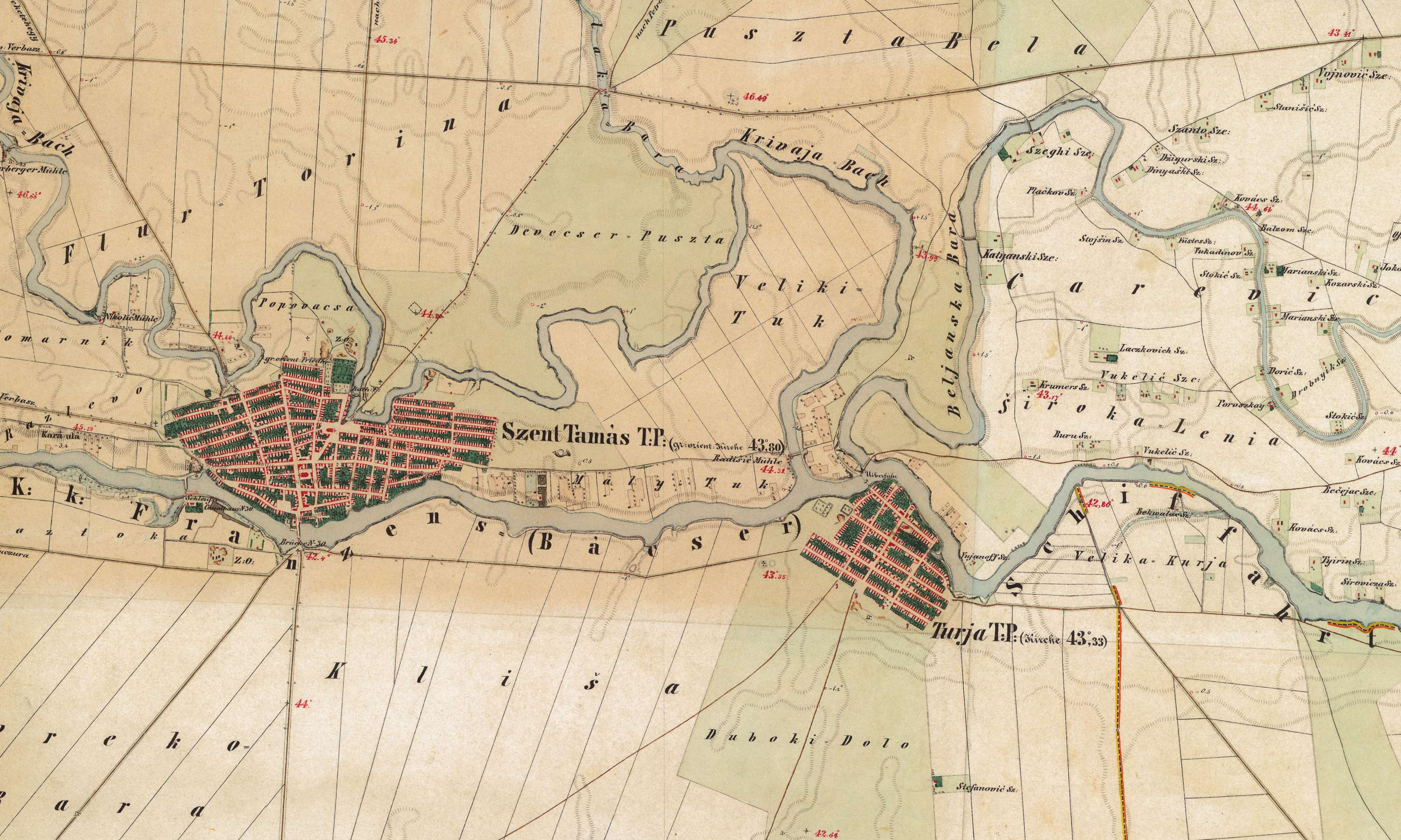
Szenttamás - Srbobran and Turia at the middle of the 19th century

Lázár Mészáros, the Hungarian Minister of War, had been looking for a commander-in-chief for the Hungarian army in Southern Hungary affected by the Serb uprising at the beginning of June. After a long search, he chose Baron Fülöp Bechtold, who was stationed in Kassa and who, as the best cavalry leader of the time, was considered one of the most promising commanders. Before that, Minister of War Mészáros had asked several army officers and generals of Hungarian origin for the job, but they did not accept the offer. Lieutenant General Bechtold accepted the order and on 10 June he took command in Óbecse, where the headquarters and the majority of the Hungarian troops were concentrated.

The victory at Versec was a brilliant one, and although it diminished for a time the fighting spirit of the insurgents, the success would nevertheless have had an even greater, perhaps decisive influence in suppressing the revolt, if Colonel Blomberg, the commander of Versec, had not hesitated so long to continue his operations, which he later hesitatingly launched only with an insufficient force: 4 infantry companies and 1 company of Uhlans.

== Prelude ==
=== The Szenttamás (Srbobran) fortified camp ===
The Szenttamás camp was established by the Serbs immediately after the battle of Karlóca on 12 June 1848. The village lies on the left bank of the Ferenc Canal and in 1848 it consisted of 1,600 houses. The northern side of the town was protected by the 1.3 m deep Krivaja stream, which meanders between 3-4 m high banks and joined the 2-3 m deep Ferenc canal at Turia. The Ferenc Canal is crossed by a bridge at the southern entrance to the town, from here the road branches off towards Verbász, Ókér, Temerin, and Turia, and west of this bridge, at the south-west corner of the town, a lock connects the two banks. The Krivaja was crossed by bridges on the roads leading to Feketehegy and Óbecse, and near Turia. Due to natural obstacles, the village could only be accessed from Óverbász, in the one-kilometer wide area between the Krivaja and the Ferenc Canal.

To prevent this, the Serbs blocked the road with a series of fortified breastworks and deep ditches, built at a steep angle. The bridge over the Ferenc Canal on the right bank was converted into a bridgehead: this was called the Pétervárad Bridgehead. On the northeastern side, the road to Óbecse was also blocked by ramparts. Here the Serbs built a separate enclosure, called Srbobran (Serbian for "Defender of the Serbs"). A small enclosure has also been built at the eastern exit of the settlement, next to the dirt road leading to Turia. On the Feketehegy road, as the bridge and road from the part of the town built on high ground could be kept under fire anyway, no separate defense work was built.

=== Hungarian and Serbian preparations ===
Lieutenant-General Bechtold was aware that the Serbs were fortifying Szenttamás. He once rode out and threatened the men with his riding whip as a sign that he would punish them if they did not abandon the building of fortifications. However, he did nothing to prevent them from building. After a month of inactivity, the Hungarian government ordered him to attack Szenttamás.

The date of the attack was set by Bechtold for 14 July.

He made no secret of this intention, and it was known in the countryside days before that the Hungarians would attack Szenttamás and Turia on 14 July. Naturally, hearing about this, the Serbs immediately started their preparations. Teodor Bosnić, a former sergeant in the Austrian Imperial-Royal Army (K.u.K.), now a national guard officer, led 400 men of the 2nd Battalion of the Pétervárad Border Guard Regiment from the so-called Roman ramparts (Note: defensive works from the ancient times, stretching between the Danube and the Tisza from Apatin to Bácsföldvár, used very successfully by the Serbs against the Hungarians during the 1848-1849 revolutionary war) to Szenttamás on 11 July, where he equipped the defenses with artillery and provided the necessary ammunition. The guns of the defenses were handled by the gunners of the Šajkaši (Csajkás) battalion.

=== Opposing forces ===
By the time the public war plan was finished, in Szenttamás and Turia, in addition to the armed population, 3,000 border guards and 2,000 Servians, with an unknown number of cannons (volunteers from the Principality of Serbia) were waiting for the Hungarian attack.

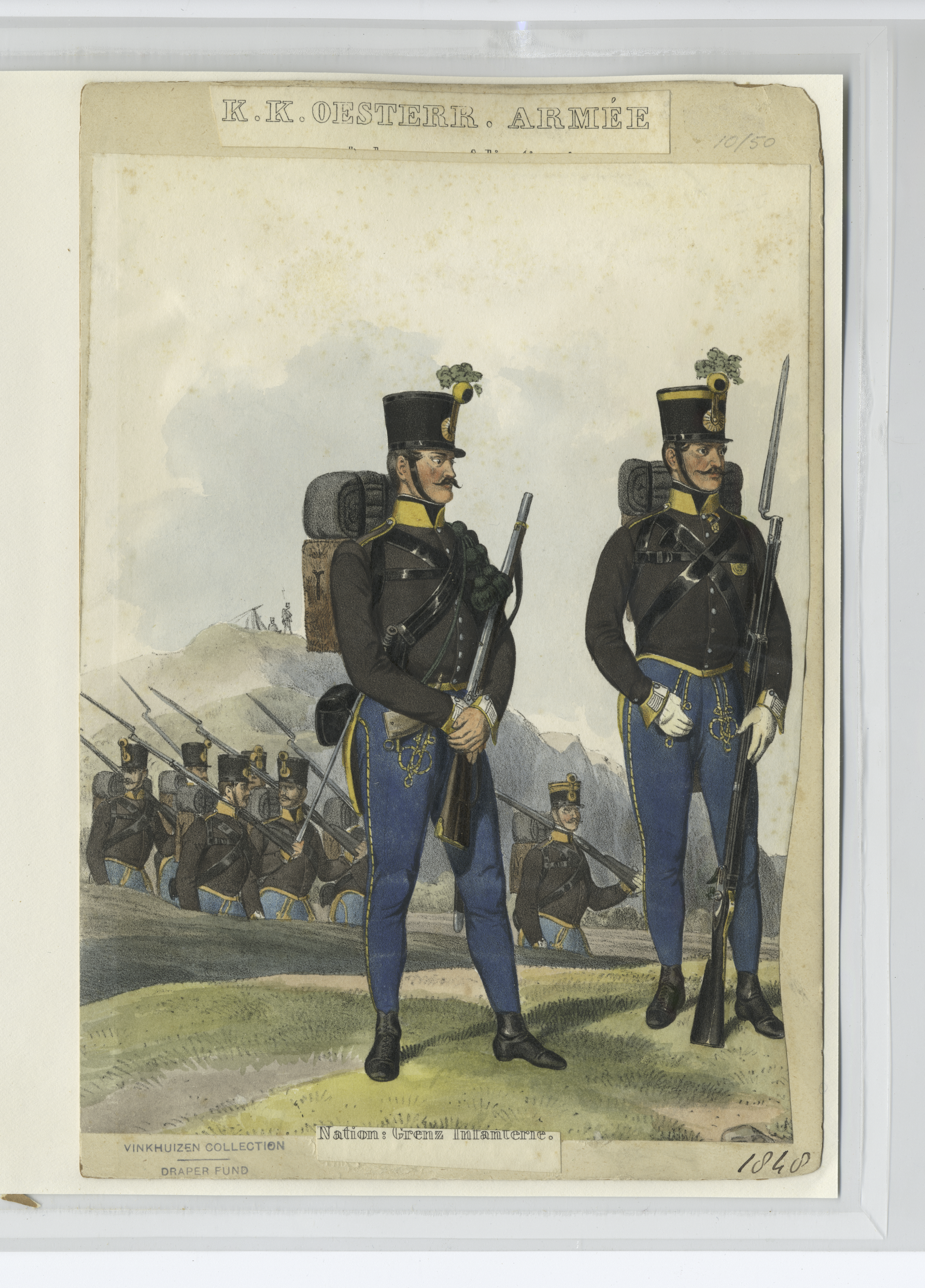
K.u.K. Border Guard soldiers

On the night of 13 to 14 July, Lieutenant General Bechtold assembled his division on the road leading to Szenttamás, and at midnight he had 4 columns of troops ready: 3 columns from Óbecse, 1 column from Kishegyes. With them he started his marching to Szenttamás and Turia.

1.Column Commanded by General Frigyes Éder. 2 companies of the Dom Miguel infantry regiment, 4 companies of the Archduke Wilhelm infantry regiment, 3 companies of the Honvéd infantry, 1 1/2 company of the Ferdinand Hussar Regiment, and a half 6-pounder battery. In all, 9 companies of infantry, 1 1/2 companies of cavalry, and 1/2 six-pounder battery marched from Óbecse on the road touching the Bela-bara and the Krivaja's north bank to Szenttamás.

2. Column Commander: captain Bergmann. 1 company Franz Karl infantry regiment, 4 companies Honvéd-infantry, two 6-pounder guns. In all, 5 infantry companies, two 6-pounder guns, marched from Óbecse against Szenttamás. The Éder's regiment was to be placed in reserve behind the Éder column.

3. Column Commanded by Hussar Colonel Kollowrat. A total of 6 companies of the Ferdinand Hussar Regiment, a 6-pound cavalry battery, marched from Kishegyes via Bácsfeketehegy to Szenttamas to join Éder's column. The Kollowrat column headed for the north-western entrance of Szenttamás.

4. Column Commander: Major János Damjanich. 2 companies of Franz Karl Infantry Regiment, 3 companies of Honvéd infantry, 1/2 company of the Ferdinand Hussar Regiment, and a 6-pounder battery. Total 5 infantry companies, 1/2 cavalry company, a 6-pounder battery. Marched against Turia from Óbecse on the road between Bela-bara and the Ferenc-canals.

All in total the Hungarian troops were 19 infantry companies, 8 cavalry companies, 17 six-pounder guns, in total 2,400 infantrymen, 700 hussars, and about 160 artillerymen.

In Óbecse, under Lieutenant Colonel Csuha, 2 companies of Honvéd and National Guard troops were left behind. It is said that the Hungarian troops arrived under Szenttamás tired due to the night march and sleeplessness.

== Siege ==
General Éder's column arrived at 7 o'clock in the morning at Szenttamás, at the same time, or perhaps even earlier, than Colonel Kollowrat's cavalry. The latter, to cover the columns' march, deployed his hussars facing the ramparts of Óbecse. Under the command of Lieutenant Fritz, the cavalry battery was deployed on the right flank of the cavalry. After a rather limited firefight, the Serbian outposts retreated, leaving the foreground of the earthworks open. Against these earthworks, the Hungarian troops encircled the curve to the Krivaja in a semicircle formation.

In the first line of battle on the right flank were the companies of the Wilhelm Infantry Regiment, on the left flank the Dom Miguel Regiment and one company of the Franz Karl infantry regiment, 7 companies in all, while in the 2nd line of battle there were also 7 Honvéd infantry companies. The cavalry, retreating from the front, formed the 3rd battle line. The left wing of the first battle line was leaning on the Krivaja.

The artillery took up positions on both sides of the road and on the right flank, and after the start of the fight, it continued to fight alone.

In the meantime from the Ókér camp, a platoon of Este infantry, a squadron of Imperial Hussars, and national guardsmen from Tolna, Szabadka, Baja, Zenta, and Bácsalmás marched to the Pétervárad bridgehead, and on the right bank of the canal, they stopped and remained inactive, listening to the cannonade from the northern side. These troops did not belong to the attacking troops led by Lieutenant General Bechtold mentioned above.

On the Serbian side, Lieutenant Živković, who commanded over the Óbecse trenches, commanded all the guns of the defensive line to shoot at the Hungarians from the beginning of the battle.

Lieutenant General Bechtold sent out the 4th squadron (7th and 8th Companies) of the Wilhelm Infantry with 2 cannons and 1 wing of cavalry under the command of Captain Piers with the order to advance along the Krivaja to one of the bridges and cross there to make a diversion against Szenttamás. The detachment did not find a passage. But when they managed to approach the entrenchment, they saw the Austrian imperial flag on it, which made it clear to them that the Habsburgs supported the Serbian revolt. This circumstance shocked the officers and soldiers and made them hesitant about what to do.

Captain Piers then returned to his original post.

Now Lieutenant Louis Souvent of the Wasa Regiment, commander of the Brigade's sapper squad, on Bechtold's orders, observed the watery trench of the earthwork and probably the Krivaja too and found that it could neither be crossed nor make a bridge over it.

As a result, Bechtold refrained from carrying out the attack, and although, despite the opposition of the corps commander, voluntary Hungarian troops spontaneously formed up in front of Wilhelm infantry regiment's troops, and wanted to attack, at noon the order was issued to cease fire and the troops to withdraw.

== Aftermath ==
The shelling lasted for three hours and cost the Hungarians 6 dead, 12 wounded, and 8 horses. According to historian József Bánlaky, the Hungarian loss was 6 dead and 17 wounded. The Serbs had 1 soldier wounded, 3 horses, and a colt shot to death.

Damjanich's column, arriving after crossing the Tirna Creek, saw that the bridge on the Ferenc Canal had been destroyed, and, lacking the technical means to make a bridge over the canal, also abandoned the attempted attack and, together with the main attacking troop, returned to Óbecse. The troops from the Ókér camp were ordered to march to Verbász at about 10 a.m. The retreat of the troops was covered by the cavalry.

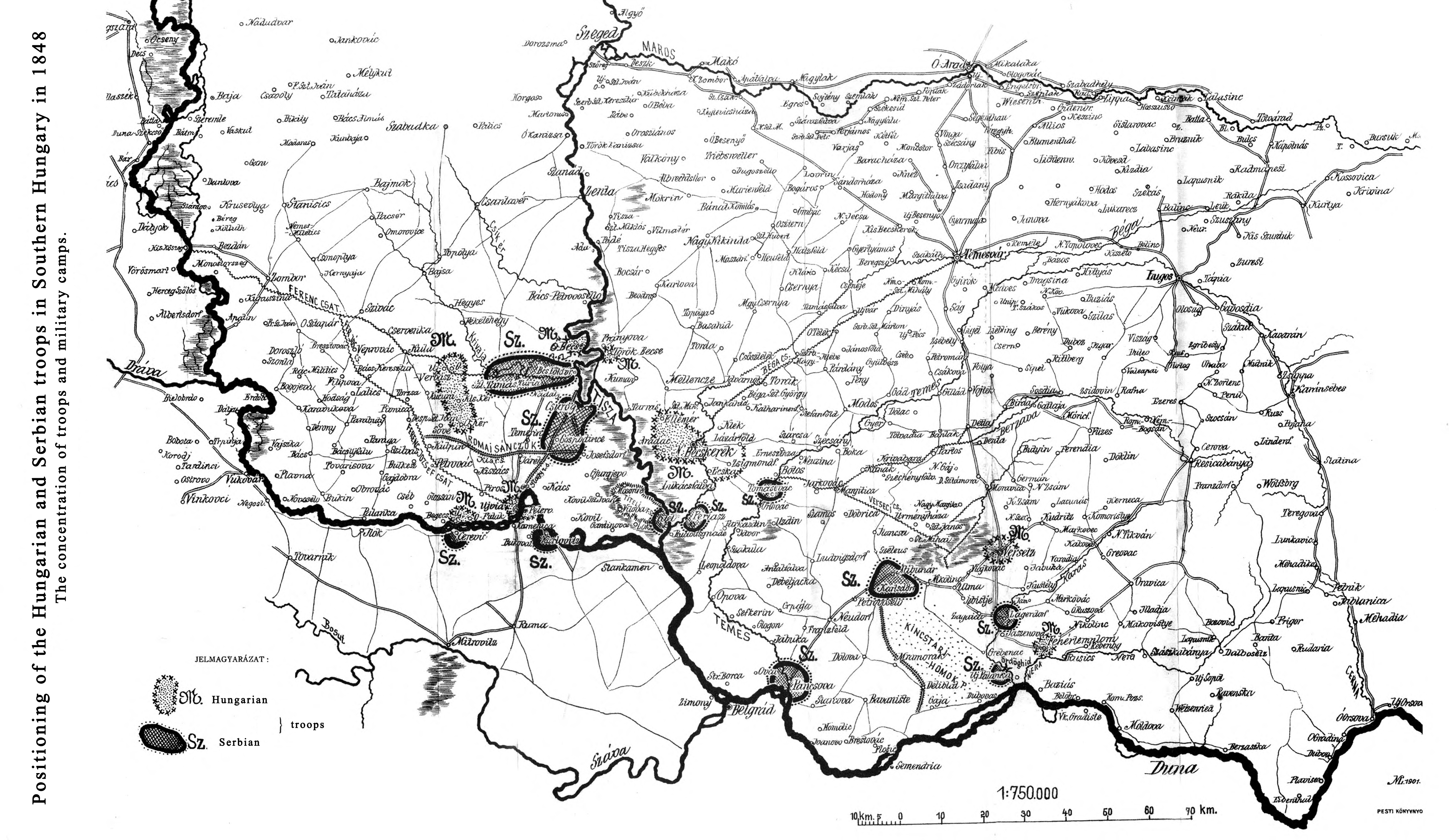
The positioning of the Hungarian and Serbian troops in 1848 with the Hungarian and Serbian troops concentrations and fortified camps

The 20-kilometer night march before the battle, the inactive standing on the battlefield for 6 hours, and then retreating with the hungry and thirsty troops, tested the discipline of the troops to the utmost. The officers in the Wilhelm Regiment in particular could hardly keep the crew in order and in line.

The direction of the attack of the Hungarian troops against both Szenttamás and Turia was unfavorable. In Szenttamás, even if the Óbecse ramparts would have been successfully blown up by the artillery, and the defenders would have been forced to retreat, the Krivaja would have still remained in front of the troops as a very hard terrain obstacle. In the latter place, the Ferenc Canal had to be crossed first to get to a hand-to-hand combat.

Previously to the battle, the high command had no idea of the difficulties created by the terrain and fortifications, because, they realized only in front of their enemy's cannons that it was impossible to attack. But the enterprise also failed as a reconnaissance, because even the Verbász trenches and the Pétervárad bridgehead were not scouted previously, although the Hungarians possessed a large cavalry, which instead of reconnoitering the enemy positions, stood in the third line of battle for half a day.

The hesitant actions of the high command showed neither talent nor determination.

The Hungarian artillery also did not do everything for the victory, because it did not expose itself enough to a direct fight with the enemy artillery, and to attack their defenses effectively.

Lieutenant-General Bechtold reported to the Hungarian military government about the unsuccessful enterprise and called for troops and siege cannons to be able to occupy Szenttamás, which, he pointed out, was heavily packed with troops and was very easy to defend. After that he took up a defensive position at Óbecse, waiting for their arrival.

The first siege of Szenttamás was a moral defeat for the Hungarians, who were disappointed in their hopes, and an encouragement to the Serbs, who continued to spread their revolt with even greater vigor.

The very next day, the Serbs attacked Écska.

== Sources ==
- Bánlaky, József (2001). A magyar nemzet hadtörténelme ("The Military History of the Hungarian Nation) (in Hungarian). Budapest: Arcanum Adatbázis.
- Bóna, Gábor (1987). Tábornokok és törzstisztek a szabadságharcban 1848–49 ("Generals and Staff Officers in the War of Freedom 1848–1849") (in Hungarian). Budapest: Zrínyi Katonai Kiadó. p. 430. ISBN 963-326-343-3.
- Hermann, Róbert (2001), 1848-1849 a szabadságharc hadtörténete ("Military History of 1848-1849") (in Hungarian), Budapest: Korona, ISBN 963-9376-21-3
- Hermann, Róbert (2004). Az 1848–1849-es szabadságharc nagy csatái ("Great battles of the Hungarian Revolution of 1848-1849") (in Hungarian). Budapest: Zrínyi. p. 408. ISBN 963-327-367-6.
- Olchváry, Ödön (1999). A magyar függetlenségi harc 1848-1849-ben a Délvidéken (in Hungarian). Budapest: Márkus Samu Könyvnyomdája. Archived from the original on 20 May 2024.
