= Serb uprising of 1848–1849 =

Part of the Revolutions of 1848 in the Austrian Empire

- Part of the Revolutions of 1848 in the Austrian Empire
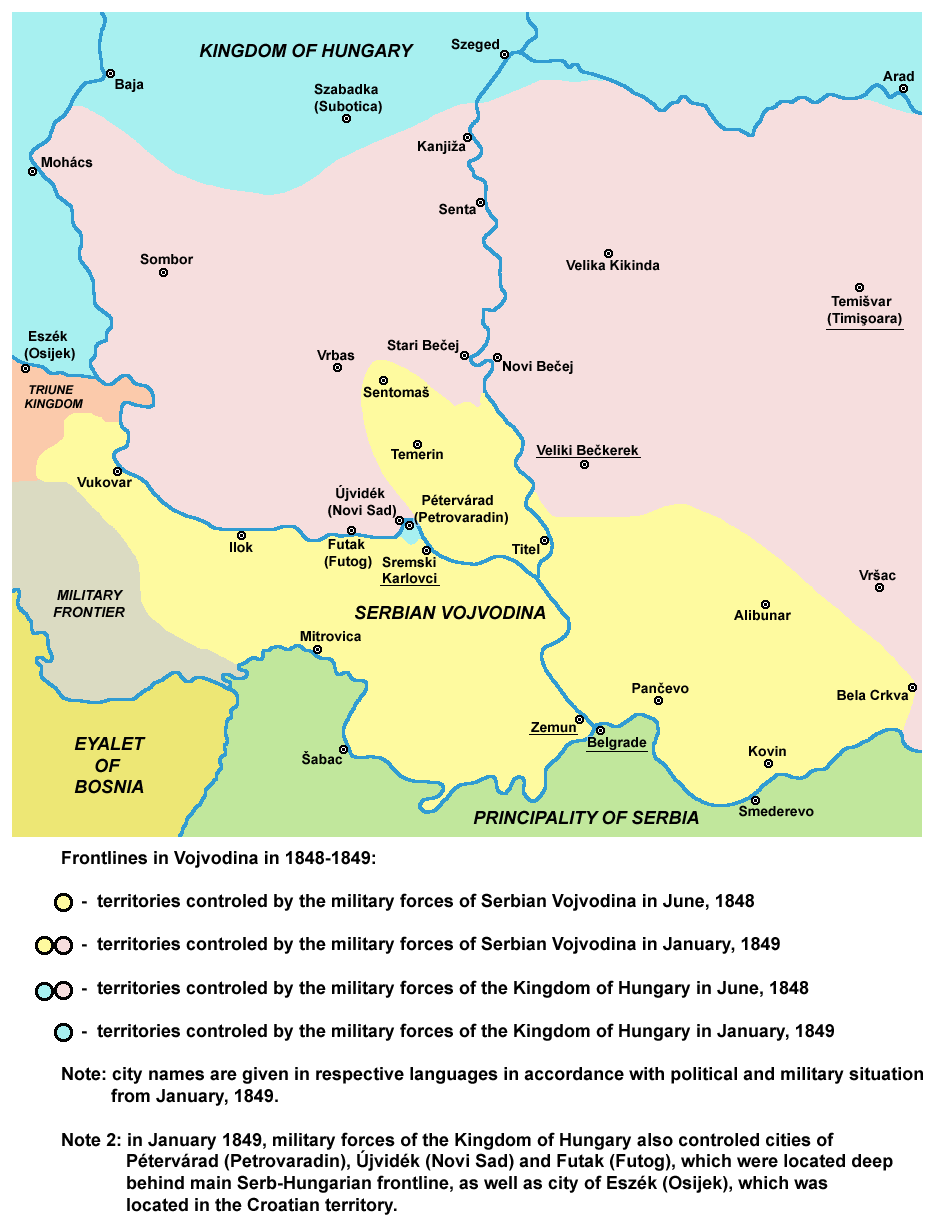
- Frontlines
Date	6 June 1848 – 4 October 1849
Location	Southern Kingdom of Hungary (now Vojvodina, Serbia)
Result	Serbian victory: Serbian autonomy

Belligerents
Serbian Vojvodina (Serbian Vojvodina) Volunteers from the Principality of Serbia Supported by: Austria	Kingdom of Hungary (6 June 1848 – 14 April 1849); Hungarian State (14 April – 13 August 1849); Banat Romanians

Commanders and leaders
(Serbian Vojvodina) Stevan Šupljikac; (Serbian Vojvodina) Đorđe Stratimirović; (Principality of Serbia) Stevan Knićanin; (Principality of Serbia) Milivoje Blaznavac; (Austrian Empire) Ferdinand Mayerhofer	Ernő Kiss; Károly Vécsey; Lázár Mészáros; Mór Perczel; Eftimie Murgu

Strength
21,084 soldiers 104 artillery guns	

The Serb uprising of 1848–1849, also known as the Serb revolution of 1848–1849 and Serb People's Movement of 1848–1849, took place in what is today Vojvodina, Serbia, and was part of the Revolutions of 1848 in the Austrian Empire. During the Hungarian Revolution, Hungarians achieved significant military successes, but were defeated after Russian intervention. Serbs led fierce battles against the Hungarians for autonomy or merge with the help of volunteers from the Principality of Serbia. The outcome of the uprising was the establishment of Serbian Vojvodina (then Voivodeship of Serbia and Banat of Temeschwar), a special autonomous region under the Austrian crown. However, the Voivodeship failed certain expectations that Serbian patriots had expressed at the May Assembly (1848). Serbs did not constitute an absolute majority of the population, while the administration was largely in the hands of German officials and officers. The Voivodeship was abolished in 1860, though some rights were kept by the Serb community. The Serbian Patriarchate was renewed, while the uprising had increased national awareness of the Serb people north of the Sava and Danube in the struggle for freedom.

== Background ==
The autocratic methods of conservative chancellor Metternich turned the Austrian Empire into a police state. It systematically suppressed any open-minded movement that would in some way undermine the blessed order. The Austrian Empire, made up of various nationalities, was a remnant of the old political conjuncture, and found it difficult getting used to the new political landscape. In the 16th century there were still various small nations and states connected to Austria, which allowed the larger community to better successfully resist the Ottoman threat. However, after the suppression of the Ottomans, the need for a centralized state disappeared. In its place, the awakening of national consciousness from the beginning of the 19th century, the Austrian community had increasingly aspired to enter into the framework of national states. The Italians, until then scattered, began to work on their national unification; the same movement occurred in the Germans. In both nations, the realization of these plans could be achieved only at the expense of the estates of the Austrian Empire and the prestige of the Habsburg dynasty. Even then, in the mid-19th century, there were many worries in Vienna that a free Serbian state in the Balkans could become an attractive point for its South Slavic subjects. The whole movement to strengthen mutual Slavic bonds, dubbed Pan-Slavism, was viewed with much suspicion as a pure political action under the leadership of Russia and with a view that it would ultimately serve her. The nationalist activity of Hungarians, very lively and impulsive in the first half of the 19th century, gradually received the character of a national struggle for full independence from Vienna. There was fighting on all sides. Metternich was aware of this, and, as his only means for maintaining the state, he clamped down on the rebels. He did not manage to do anything notable to channel the currents with the previous measures, nor was he able to rely on the part of the population that sincerely sought change in the system, but which had not yet come out of the frame of the state union.

In February 1848, the revolution broke out in Paris, destroying the monarchy and leading to the proclamation of the republic in France. This rocked the foundations of the crumbling Austrian empire, leading to uprisings throughout its territories. German patriots gathered in Frankfurt in an All-German Parliament, which clearly expressed its desire for German unification, but not under the leadership of Austria. As a response, the All-Slavic meeting in Prague followed, in which several Serbs participated. Simultaneously to these political manifestation, fights began on the street. There were even alarms in loyal imperial Vienna. Metternich needed to be sacrificed, but it did not calm the boiling spirits, especially not where the movement got not only the character of the struggle for constitutional freedoms, but also for national liberation.

== Prelude ==
The Hungarians became the most dangerous in Austria, led by the temperamented orator Lajos Kossuth. In their nationalism, the Hungarians never had enough measures. On the area of the Crown of St. Stephen they were a constant minority in relation to the other nationalities, however, their state was represented and led by only them. Fearing that they would lose that supremacy or have to share it, they began efforts by all means to preserve a Hungarian character to the state. In this pursuit they were necessary to come into conflict with other nationalities, primarily with the Serbs and Croats. The Serbs had their privileges with a kind of religious autonomy, which the Hungarians had long looked down upon, and which was in danger of one day being abolished. Croats had also kept their historical rights and especially their language, which use was narrowed by organization of the Hungarians. The Viennese government had often used the Serbs and Croats, whose militancy was well known, as its instrument to curb Hungary's desires. This created an even larger gap between them and the Hungarians, because along with opposition from the Hungarians, it came in a moment of absolute disbelief.

When the news came of the riots in Paris followed by those in Vienna, and when it became clear what the Hungarians sought, the Serbs and Croats immediately raised their voices. Zagreb had become very active under the leadership of Ban Josip Jelačić, a Frontier colonel, who gave his movement a combative character while still showing affection towards the Habsburg dynasty. The Frontiersmen, some of the best soldiers in the Austrian army, were at the time more loyal to the Austrian court than many German regiments. The Frontiersmen, both the Serbs and the Croats, were considered incredibly loyal and effective. A popular song at the time went When the Holy Emperor desires, the Frontiersman jumps into death!.

As part of the Revolutions of 1848, the Serbs under Austria-Hungary demanded what they had in the previous century; recognition of Serbian as official language, equality of the Orthodox church as with Catholics, and annual church assembly gatherings. They met at Sremski Karlovci and Novi Sad.

== May Assembly ==
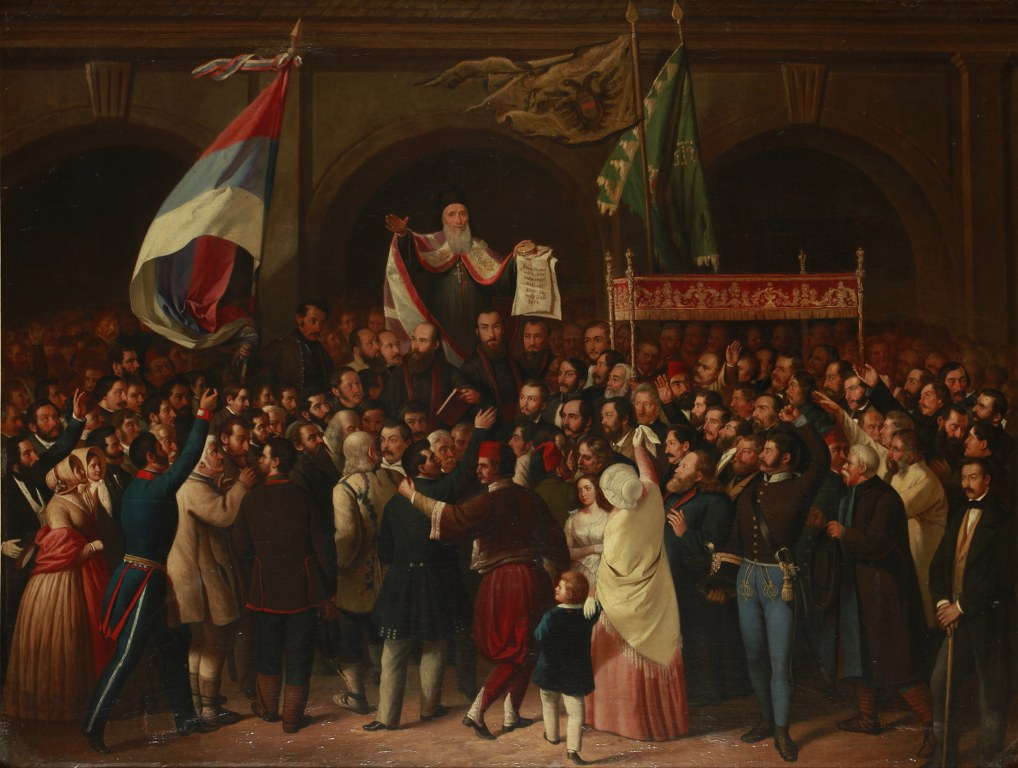
May Assembly, by Pavle Simić (1818–1876).

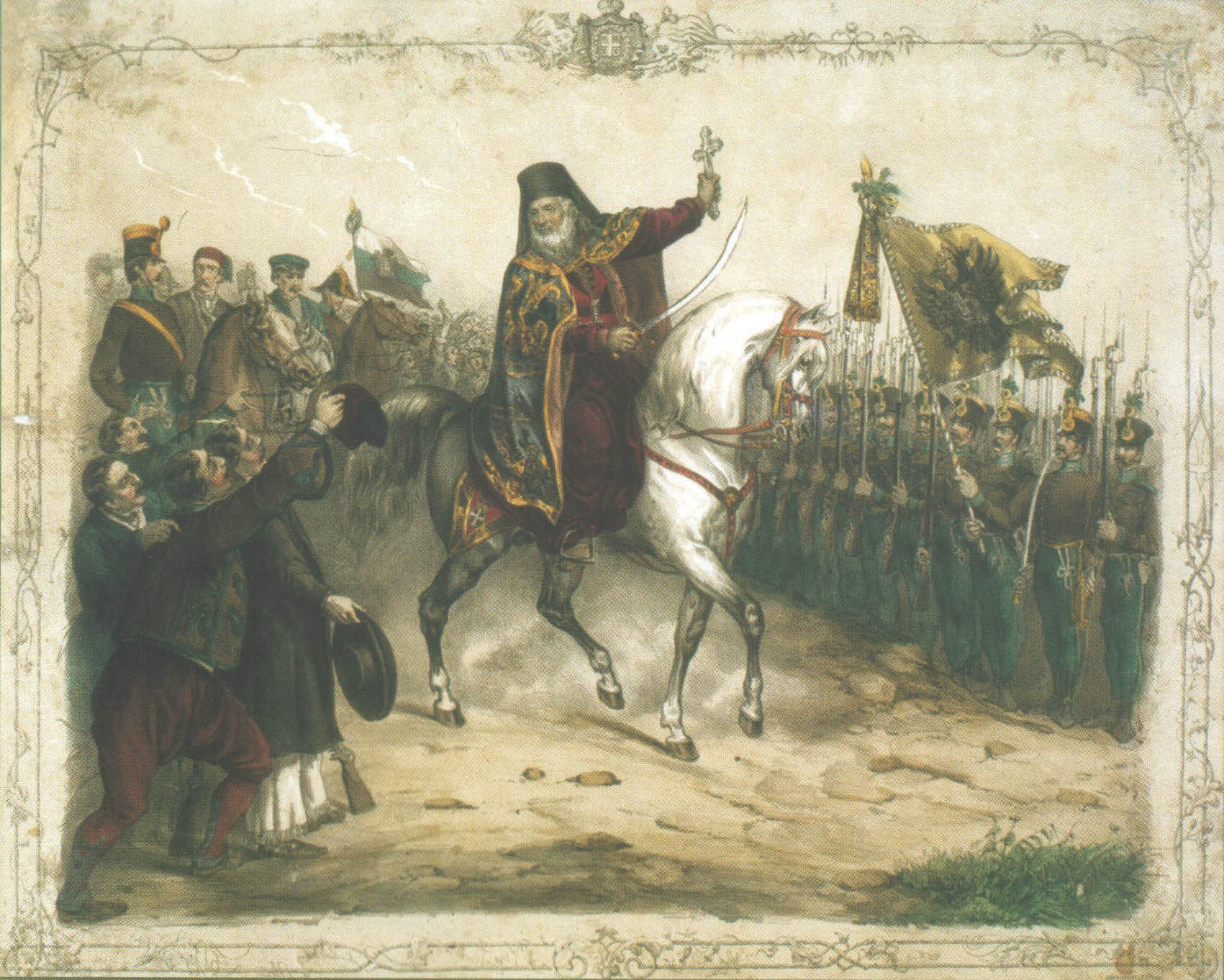
Serbian patriarch Josif Rajačić is giving a blessing to the army of Serbian Vojvodina in 1848.

Several thousand Serbs met at the May Assembly in Sremski Karlovci on 1 May 1848. The delegates chose Šupljikac as voivode, the civil and military commander. Josif Rajačić was elected the patriarch of the Serbs. The Serbs demanded a national unit consisting of Banat, Bačka, Baranja and part of Srem, known collectively as Vojvodina.

== Uprising ==
=== Summer 1848 ===
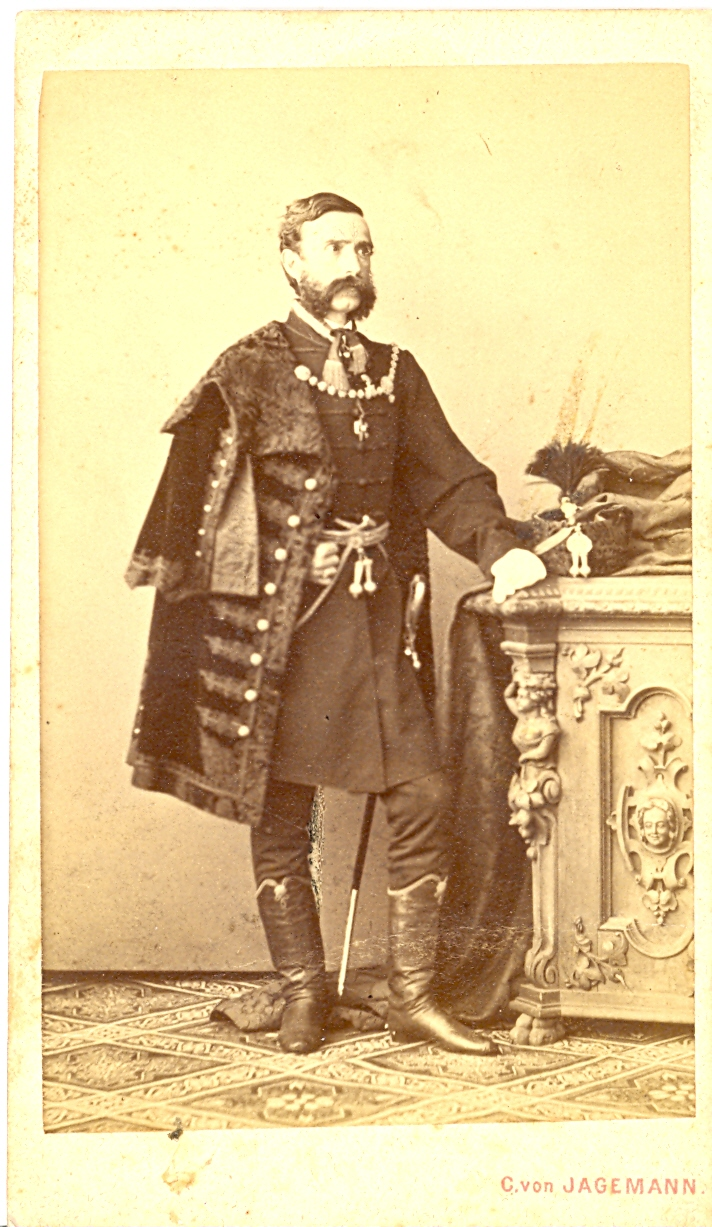
General Đorđe Stratimirović (1822-1908)

In the spring of 1848, the assemblies of the Serbs held in Pest and Újvidék (Novi Sad) demanded recognition of Serbs as a nation and abolition of feudalism in the Military Frontier. When the Serb envoys appeared in Pozsony, Kossuth informed them that they could not be recognized as an independent nation. This was because the new Liberal concept of a nation brought by the revolution was that in Hungary only one political nation could exist, and that was the Hungarian nation. The term 'Hungarian nation' referred to all the people of different languages living in Hungary. Kossuth and the Hungarian politicians knew that accepting political nations other than the Hungarian within the country would lead to the separation of those nations and dismemberment of the country.

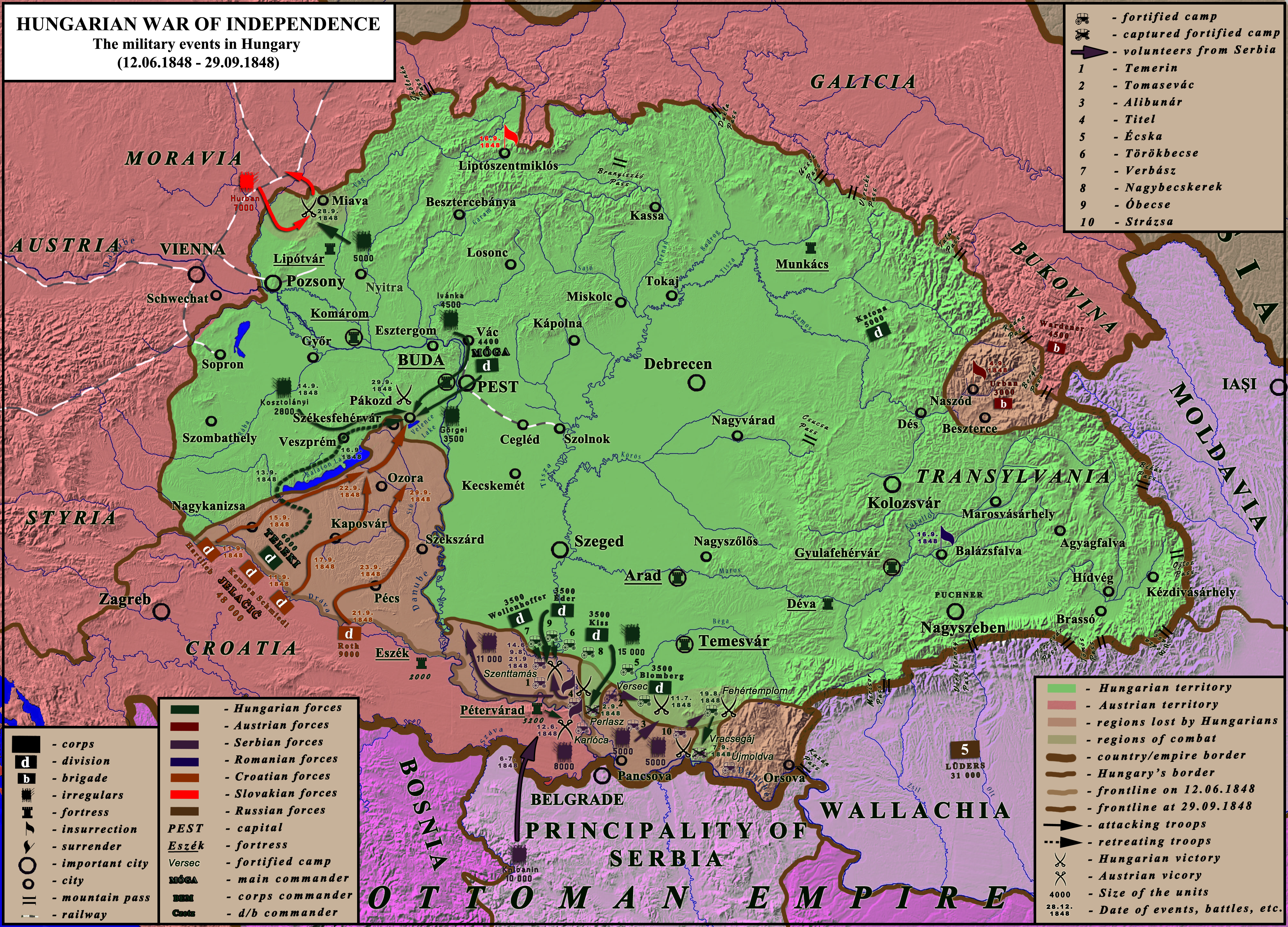
The military situation in Hungary between 12.06.1848-29.09.1848

On 13–15 May 1848, the Serb National Assembly in Karlóca established the Serb Main Committee (also known as the "Main Odbor"), followed by the formation of various districts and local committees in late May and early June. The Orthodox Archbishop Josif Rajačić was initially elected as the chairman of the Main Odbor, but later resigned and was replaced by Đorđe Stratimirović, who had previously served as an officer in the K.u.K. army and had the necessary skills to organize an armed force. The Assembly in Karlóca called upon the Serb population to take up arms.

At the end of May, the Main Board repeatedly called for an armed uprising of the Serb population in the south, and in early June asked also the border guard regiments to join the uprising. Rajačić traveled to Zagreb in early June, where he formed an alliance with the leader of the Croatian movement, Josip Jelačić. There was much fighting in Vojvodina in June between Hungarian and Serb revolutionary bands. On 8 June, the Hungarian government ordered Lieutenant-General János Hrabovszky, the commander-in-chief of the Slavonia and Syrmia (Szerémség) regions, to put an end to the increasingly dangerous movement of the Serbs and even disperse by force of arms the Main Odbor from Karlóca. On 12 June, Hrabovsky and his troops attacked the town. The Battle of Karlóca that started, was the first clash of the Hungarian War of Independence. At first, the Hungarian attack was successful, but the Serbs received reinforcements from other settlements, and fearing an encirclement, Hrabovszky retreated. This success further inflamed the Serb insurrection. The situation in the southern region was worsened by the arrival of several thousand volunteers from the Principality of Serbia, who intended to assist their fellow conationals. In June and July a large wave of volunteers from Serbia entered Vojvodina, and Stevan Knićanin, as a Serbian commissioner, arrived on 25 July, while the new emperor Franz Joseph approved the appointments of Šupljikac and Rajačić. The volunteer involvement played a crucial role in the outcome of the Karlóca assembly and in the intense fighting that began in mid–June, which often degenerated into gruesome massacres against civilians.

The Serb border guards started to set up fortified camps, from which they attacked the German, Romanian, and Hungarian settlements of Bácska and Bánság (Banat), expelling, conquering and even massacring some of their population. The leaders, mostly of foreign origin, of the K.u.K. army subordinated to the Hungarian government, did not make much effort to put down this uprising. Peace negotiation attempts began almost at the same time as the outbreak of armed hostilities. The first to make contact with the leaders of the Serb insurgents was royal commissioner Péter Chernovits (of Serb origin), but the ceasefire concluded on 24 June was used by the Serbs to gather more forces, thus the fight continued shortly afterward.

On 15 June, 1848, the Banat Romanians, led by radical democrat Eftimie Murgu, organised a National Assembly in Lugoj, with the support of the Hungarian Banat Commissioner Sebő Vukovics. On this occasion, unlike the Transylvanian Romanians, they pledged their allegiance to the Hungarian Revolutionary Government, as well as:

1. the formation of a Romanian General Captainship in Banat, with Murgu as Captain-general;
2. the formation of a Popular Romanian Army;
3. the recognition of Romanian as an official language in Banat;
4. the independence of the Romanian Orthodox Church from the Patriarchate of Karlovci.

In the fights during July and August, despite some Hungarian victories (the battles of Versec, Écska, Futak, Fehértemplom), due to the obstruction of the defense by the majority of the Austrian officers, the incompetence or lack of determination of the Hungarian commanders, the Serbs took over most of the Southern Banat and Southern Bácska regions, being greeted by a part of the Serb population, and forcing those who were reluctant with promises or threats to join. Between the second part of July and the first half of August, the Hungarians lost one after other important localities as Bácsföldvár, Pancsova, Uzdin, Kovacsica, Padina, Jarkovác, Margitica, Tomasevác, Neuzina, Szárcsa, Szécsány, Ernesztháza, Bóka, the only town which withstood the Serb attacks was Fehértemplom, which repelled two Serb attacks on 19 and 30 August. The first notable Hungarian success of the war in the south was the capture of the Serb fortified camp from Perlasz on 2 September. The Hungarians, however, did not take advantage of the success, and the start of the Croatian campaign in Transdanubia starting on 11 September caused the Hungarian troops to retreat to defensive positions.

Despite the apparently neutral stance of the Habsburg government, Ferdinand Mayerhofer von Grünbühel, the Austrian consul in Belgrade, was one of the main supporters of the anti-Hungarian efforts of the Serbs and the participation of Serbian volunteers in the fighting. The Belgrade consul first played a major role in encouraging Serbian volunteers to go to Hungary to fight the Hungarians and then sought to promote an alliance between the Serbs and Croatian Ban Josip Jelačić. Later, during the winter months, he took over the command of the joint Austrian–Serb corps, and led it against the Hungarian units.

The most important Serb fortified camp established in Bácska, Szenttamás (Srbobran), was located on the banks of the Franz Canal. Taking advantage of the natural conditions, by the end of June 1848, the Serbs had established a substantial system of entrenchments around the settlement. The soldiers of the Titel Šajkaši battalion equipped the entrenchments with three-pounder cannons. The First Siege of Szenttamás took place on 14 July 1848 but the Hungarian attack was repulsed. The Hungarians repeated the attack on 19 August, but the Serbs again repulsed the attack.

=== Autumn 1848 ===
On 21 September, the Minister of War, General Lázár Mészáros, attempted the to take Szenttamás again, but this siege also failed.

== Battles ==
- Siege of Petrovaradin (December 1848–7 September 1849)
- Battle of Pančevo (2 January 1849), Serbian victory
- Battle of Vršac (January 1849), Serbian victory
- Battle of Sombor (1849), Hungarian victory
- Battle of Sirig (1849), Hungarian victory
- Battle of Horgoš (1849), Hungarian victory
- Battle of Srbobran (3 April 1849), Hungarian victory
- Battles for Šajkaška (1849)
  - Mošorin and Vilovo (12 April), Serbian victory
  - Kać and Budisav (6 May), Serbian victory
  - Vilovo, Titel and Mošorin (22–26 May), Serbian victory
  - Vilovo and Mošorin (1 May), Serbian victory
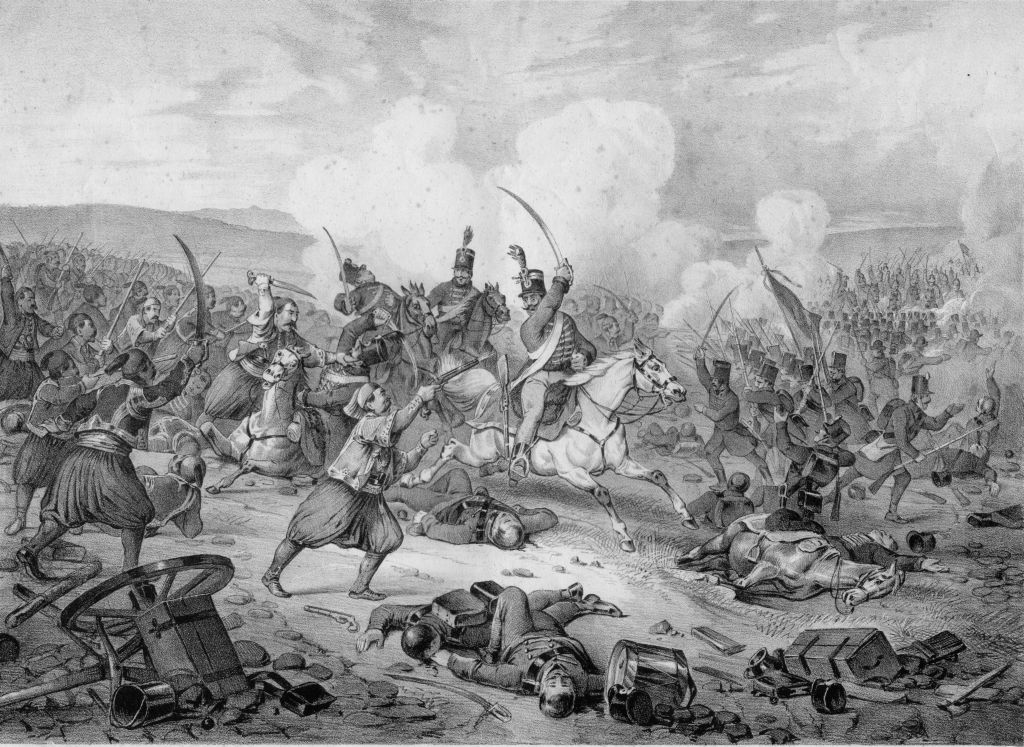
Battle of Vršac, January 1849

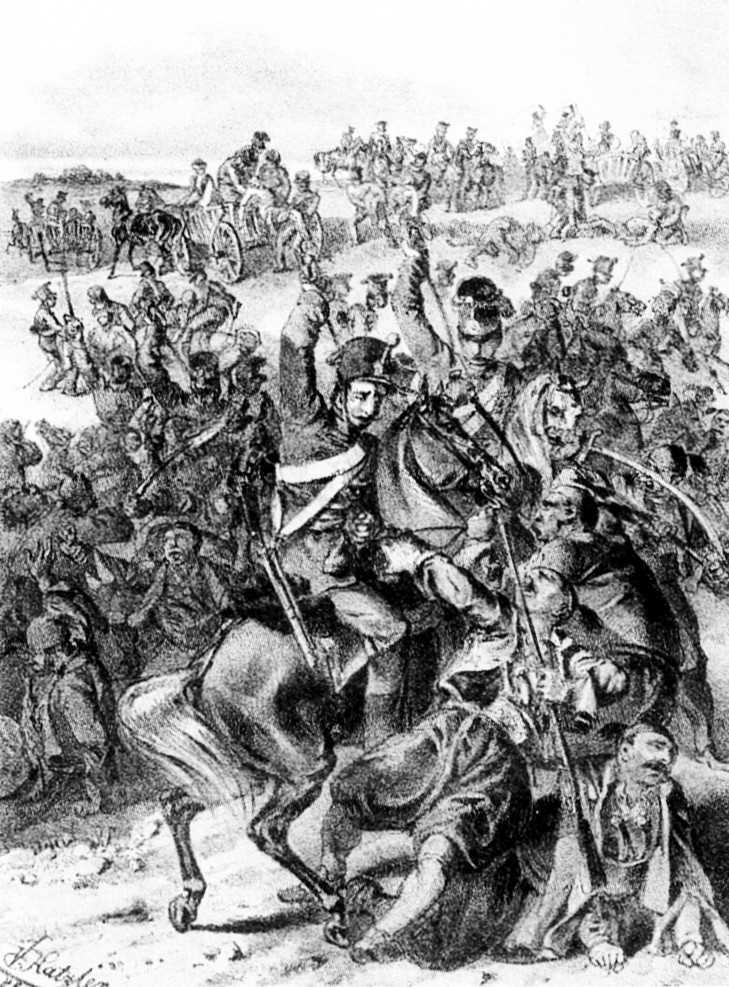
Battle of Vilovo, by Vinzenz Katzler, 1849.

== See also ==
- List of revolutions and rebellions
- List of rebellions in the Habsburg monarchy

== Sources ==
- Bataković, Dušan T. (2014). The Foreign Policy of Serbia (1844-1867): IIija Garašanin's Načertanije. Belgrade: Institute for Balkan Studies. ISBN 978-86-7179-089-5.
- Ćorović, Vladimir (2001) [1997]. "Српски покрет 1848. године". Историја српског народа (in Serbian). Belgrade: Јанус.
- Hermann, Róbert (2009). Magyarország története [History of Hungary] (in Hungarian). Vol. 14. Budapest: Kossuth Kiadó. ISBN 978-963-095-69-25.
- Hermann, Róbert (2004). Az 1848–1849-es szabadságharc nagy csatái ("Great battles of the Hungarian War of Independence of 1848–1849") (in Hungarian). Budapest: Zrínyi. ISBN 963-327-367-6.
- Jelavich, Barbara (1983). History of the Balkans: Eighteenth and Nineteenth Centuries. Vol. 1. Cambridge: Cambridge University Press. ISBN 978-0-521-25249-2.
- Krestić, Vasilije (1997). History of the Serbs in Croatia and Slavonia 1848–1914. Belgrade: BIGZ. ISBN 978-86-13-00888-0.
- Markus, Tomislav (2009). "Between revolution and legitimacy: The Croatian political movement of 1848-1849 and the formation of the Croatian national identity". Review of Croatian History. 5: 13–45.
- Markus, Tomislav (2010). "The Serbian question in Croatian politics, 1848-1918". Review of Croatian History. 6: 165–188.
- Miller, Nicholas J. (1997). Between Nation and State: Serbian Politics in Croatia Before the First World War. Pittsburgh: University of Pittsburgh Press. ISBN 978-0-8229-7722-3.
- Olchváry, Ödön (1902). A magyar függetlenségi harc 1848–1849-ben a Délvidéken. Budapest.
- Rohrbach, Wolfgang (2017). "Kaiser Franz Joseph I und Die Serben 1848-1908" (PDF). Istorija 20. Veka: Časopis Instituta za savremenu istoriju. 35 (1): 9–37. doi:10.29362/IST20VEKA.2017.1.ROR.9-37. Archived from the original on 9 November 2025.
- Spira, György (1959). A magyar forradalom 1848–49-ben [The Hungarian Revolution in 1848–1849] (in Hungarian). Budapest: Gondolat Kiadó. p. 676.
- Thim, József (1940). A magyarországi 1848-49-iki szerb fölkelés története I. (PDF). Magyar Történelmi Társulat, Budapest.
- Vucinich, Wayne S. (1967). "The Serbs in Austria-Hungary". Austrian History Yearbook. 3 (2): 3–47. doi:10.1017/S0067237800018725.
