= Third siege of Szenttamás =

First battle of the Hungarian War of Independence 1848

Coordinates: 45°32′48.7″N 19°47′58.4″E

- Part of the Hungarian Revolution of 1848
Date	21 September 1848
Location	Szenttamás, Bács-Bodrog County, Kingdom of Hungary (today Srbobran, Serbia)
Result	Serbian victory

Belligerents
Hungarian Revolutionary Army	Austrian Empire: Serbian Vojvodina

Commanders and leaders
Lázár Mészáros	Petar Biga

Strength
10,500 men 45 cannons	8,784 men 31 cannons

Casualties and losses
20–30 (100) dead	?

The third siege of Szenttamás (now Srbobran, in the South Bačka District, Vojvodina, Serbia) was an attempt of siege during the Hungarian War of Independence of 1848-1849, as a part of the Serb uprising of 1848–49, on 21 September 1848, carried out by the Hungarian Army under the command of General Lázár Mészáros against the Serbian fortified encampment in Szenttamás and Turia held by the Serb insurgents led by Captain Petar Biga. The Hungarians committed a series of mistakes, and Mészáros did not show enough strength to ensure discipline and order in his army, in which the officers of foreign origin were not sure on which side to fight. When, despite the resistance of the besieging Hungarian army, a relief force of 3000 Serbs and 7 cannons managed to enter Szenttamás, Mészáros decided to end the siege and retreat.

== Background ==
After the failure of the second siege of Szenttamás, the public outrage was tremendous. Mór Perczel in the Hungarian Parliament said that the defeat was caused by the treason of the commander of the besieging Hungarian troops Baron Lieutenant-General Fülöp Bechtold, who then resigned. Shortly after the Royal and Imperial (K.u.K.) High Commandment from Vienna called him to the empire's capital. Later, during the summer campaign of 1849, he was assigned to lead a cavalry brigade in the Austrian army led by Julius Jacob von Haynau against Hungary.

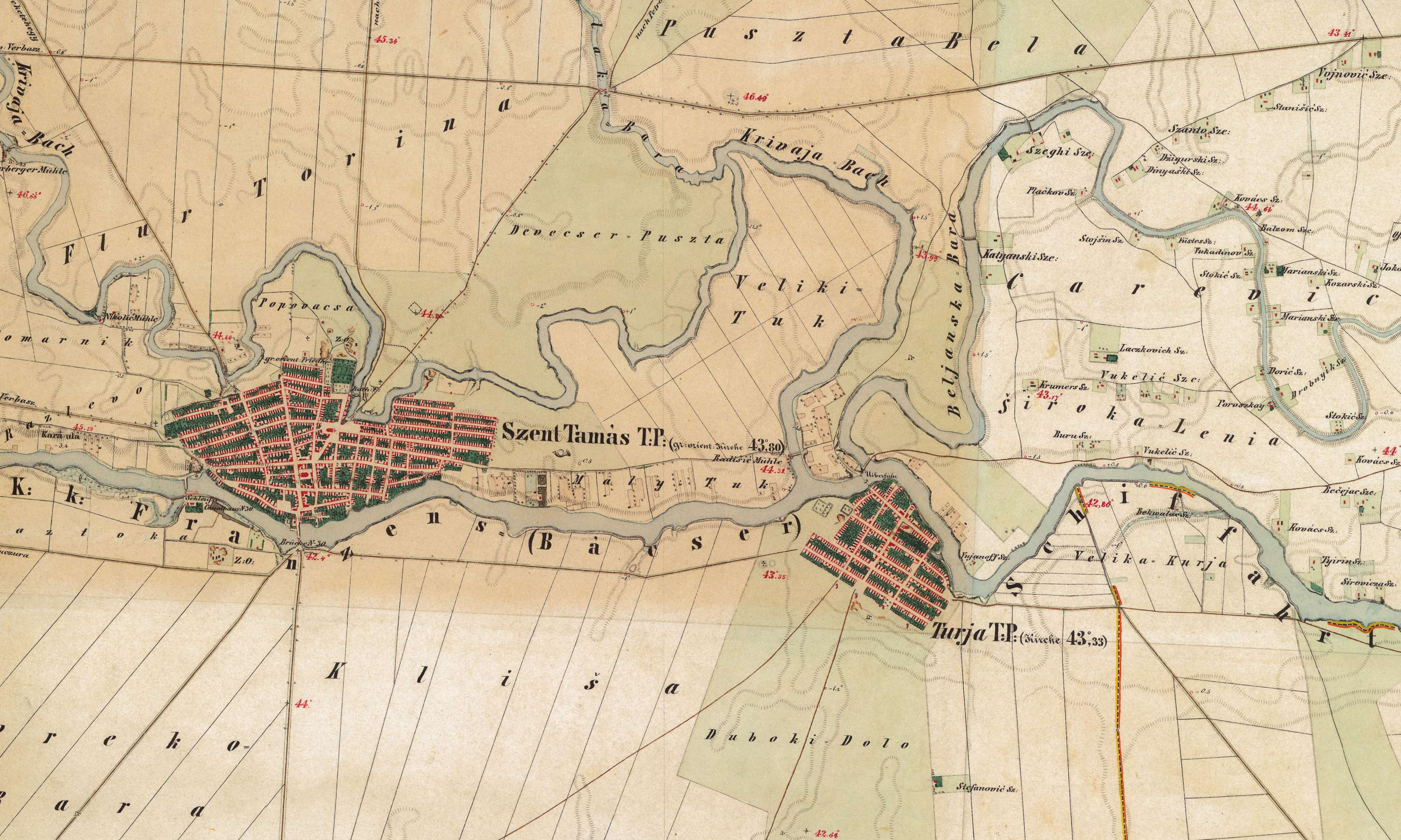
Szenttamás – Srbobran and Turia at the middle of the 19th century

Bechtold's example illustrates the questionable loyalty towards the Hungarian government of the non Hungarian officers, soldiers, and troops fighting the Serbs in Délvidék (Vojvodina) Many non-Hungarian born imperial officers, and troops conscripted outside of Hungary who had sworn loyalty to the Hungarian government by the order of the king, could not be trusted, because the Serb troops included not only volunteers who came from the Principality of Serbia

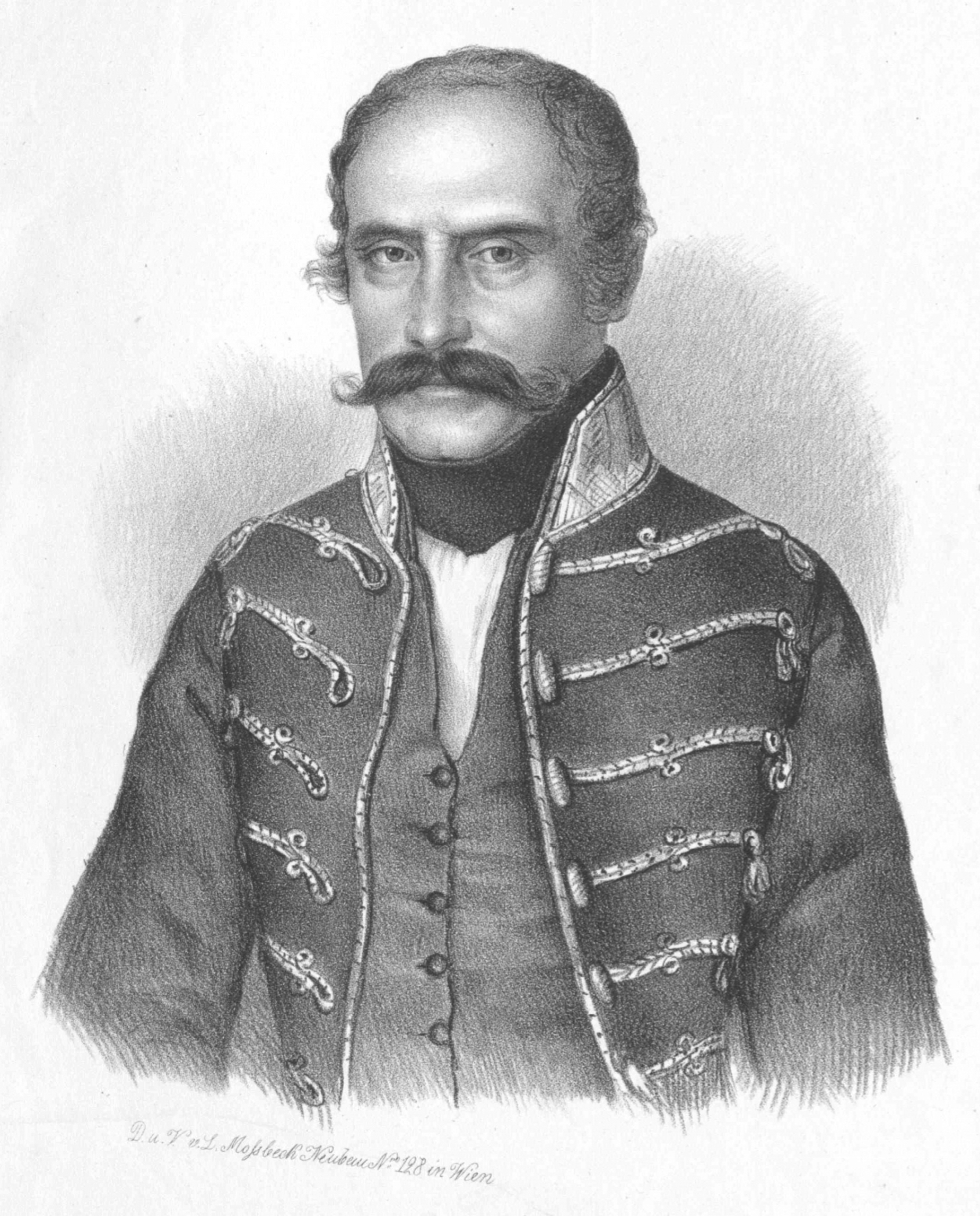
Mészáros Lázár portréja

(Servians) and local peasant insurgents, but also soldiers of the Serbian border guard regiments belonging to the Imperial Royal Army. Therefore, many officers and military units of non-Hungarian origin, despite having received orders from the Hungarian government to attack, refused to fight against their former comrades in the imperial army. For example, when on 30 August the Serbs attacked Fehértemplom the K.u.K. troops did not help the Hungarians. The officers of the 2nd (Schwarzenberg) Uhlan Regiment led by Colonel Blomberg, camped in Versec, which had sworn previously oath to the Hungarian constitution, declared steadfastly, that they would not go to the aid of Fehértemplom and would not fight against the Serbian border guards. Therefore, the Serbs led by Stevan Knićanin were beaten back only by the 9th (Red Hatted) Honvéd Battalion and the city's militia.

Bechtold was replaced by the Minister of War, General Lázár Mészáros, who was hoping to deliver a decisive defeat to the Serbs, thus making the presence of larger Hungarian forces in Délvidék unnecessary, so he could send the larger part of this army to the Dráva, where the start of the invasion of Josip Jelačić's Croatian army was only a matter of days.

The Minister of War wasn't confident at all of his own abilities as a military commander, but at least he could be trusted to continue the operations with full force. Mészáros - under pressure from public opinion, outraged by the previous failed sieges - set the goal of finally capturing the Szenttamás fortified encampment.

== Prelude ==
The plan for the third siege of Szenttamás was prepared by Major József Klauzál, whom Mészáros appointed as his chief of staff. This plan, the work of several weeks, covered 46 full sheets of paper and was accompanied by numerous drawings. Egy ilyen terjedelmes haditerv azonban ennek sikeres gyakorlati kivitelére nem volt alkalmas. József Klauzál "managed" to draw up a battle plan which, as in the first two sieges, made it impossible to concentrate the forces. Following the government's urging, Mészáros set the siege of Szenttamás for 19 September; but postponed it until the 21st because of rain.

=== Opposing forces ===
Mészáros estimates the number of troops at his disposal: 8 line regimental battalions of 6,000 men, 8 Honvéd battalions of 8,000 men, 2,000 cavalry, 8 batteries with 48 guns, and 2 mortars. A total of about 14,000 men on foot and 2,000 on horseback. Of this force, 1 infantry battalion, 1 hussar squadron, and 1 battery were at Futak to maintain communications with Pétervárad. After deducting the sick men and the garrisons, Mészáros for the siege of Szenttamás deployed 9,000 infantry, 1,500 cavalry, 7 1/2 batteries, and 2 mortars. Of the National Guard, which was almost twice as numerous as the regular troops, only the detachments stationed at Óbecse took part in the siege, but even these were sent under the command of Colonel Fach to Turia, but not for offensive actions, but only in support of the main attack.

The Serb forces and commanders remained generally the same after the siege of 19 August. At Szenttamás and Turia were 5,784 men and 24 guns. Petar Biga was in command at Szenttamás and Petar Jovanović at Turia. At the same time in Csurog, in the area of the Šajkaši battalion, under the command of Captain Mihajlo Jovanović, the 3rd and 4th battalions of the Pétervárad Border Guard Regiment and 6 guns were on standby to assist, if needed, Szenttamás and Turia and to cover the Roman Ramparts (Note: defensive works from the ancient times, stretching between the Danube and the Tisza from Apatin to Bácsföldvár, used very successfully by the Serbs against the Hungarians during the 1848-1849 revolutionary war).

The enclosed trench of Szőreg behind the Almáska marsh was defended by Melentije Budimirović with a squadron of infantry and a 3-pounder gun.

=== Deployment of the Hungarian troops for the battle ===
The attack was carried out by the Hungarians in three columns.

Right column. Commander General Frigyes Éder, leading 5 infantry Battalions. Most of the cavalry of the army was in this column under Colonel Kolowrath. The cavalry operated in the direction of the Roman ramparts to prevent the enemy from breaking out, while the battalion led by Éder, under whose covering the smaller part of the artillery, with two 30-pound mortars had to bombard the city and the Pétervárad bridgehead.

On the left bank of the canal, the columns of Bakonyi and Aulich pushed forward against the camp, which was heavily entrenched also at the rear.

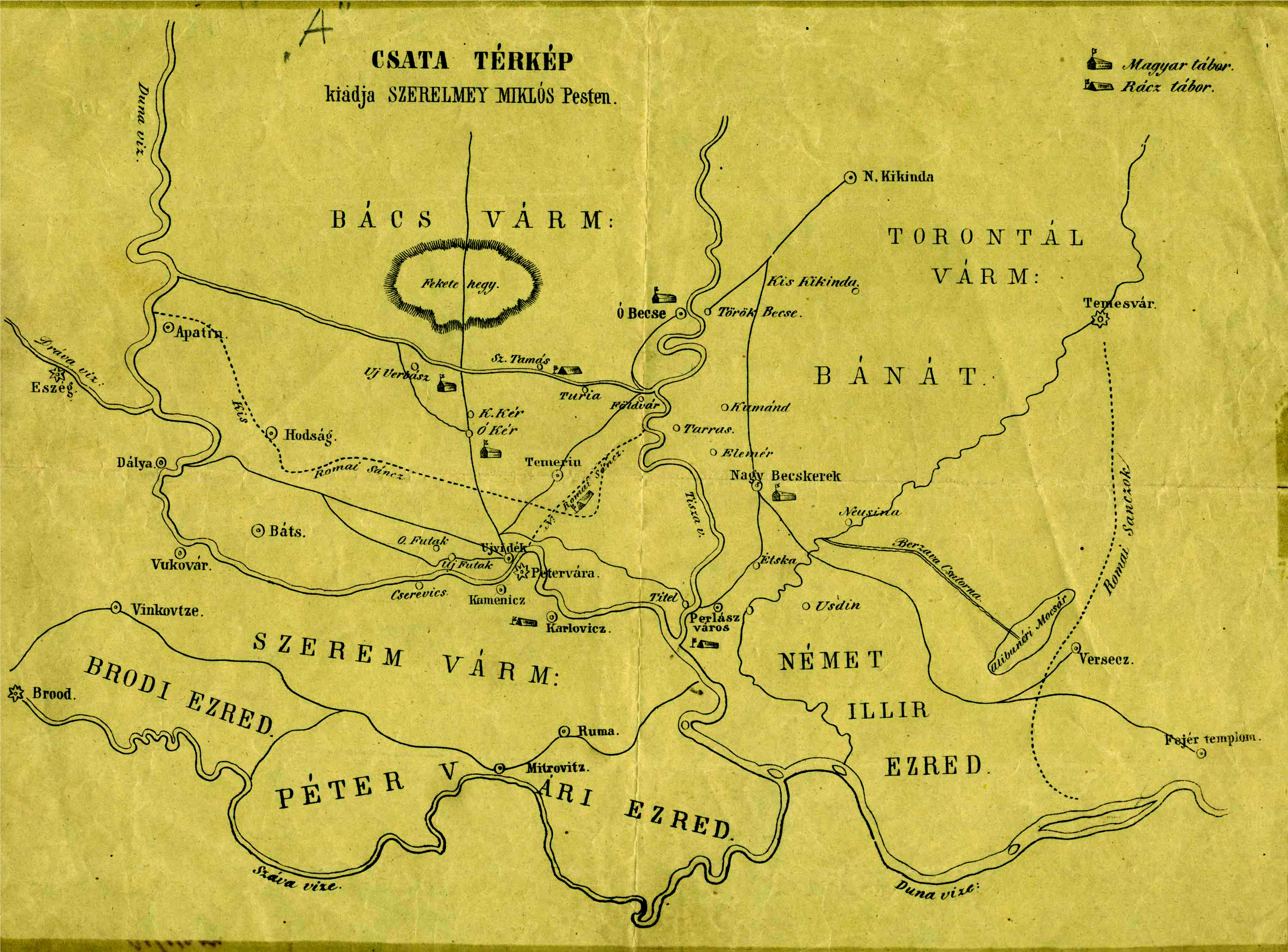
The War Theater in Southern Hungary in 1849. Dotted line: The Roman trenches

Central column. Commander General Baron Sándor Bakonyi. Under his command were 2 line regiment battalions, 2 Honvéd battalions, most of the army's artillery were sent to attack against the Verbász ramparts on the left bank of the Ferenc Canal.

Left column. Commander Lieutenant Colonel Lajos Aulich - (under General Bakonyi) commanded 2 infantry battalions, and one cavalry squadron. It was sent against the Verbász entrenchments on the right bank of the Krivaja.

All the columns departed from Óverbász. At a greater distance from Szenttamás, a mobile bridge was built across the Ferenc Canal to enable the right column to cross it and maintain communication.

Fack, a retired colonel was sent from Óbecse with low-quality, mostly national guards, to operate against the ramparts of Szenttamás which were in the direction of Óbecse. Further troops were sent to Ókér to attack from there the Szőreg rampart, and other units were detached to Kiskér to maintain the connection with the army.

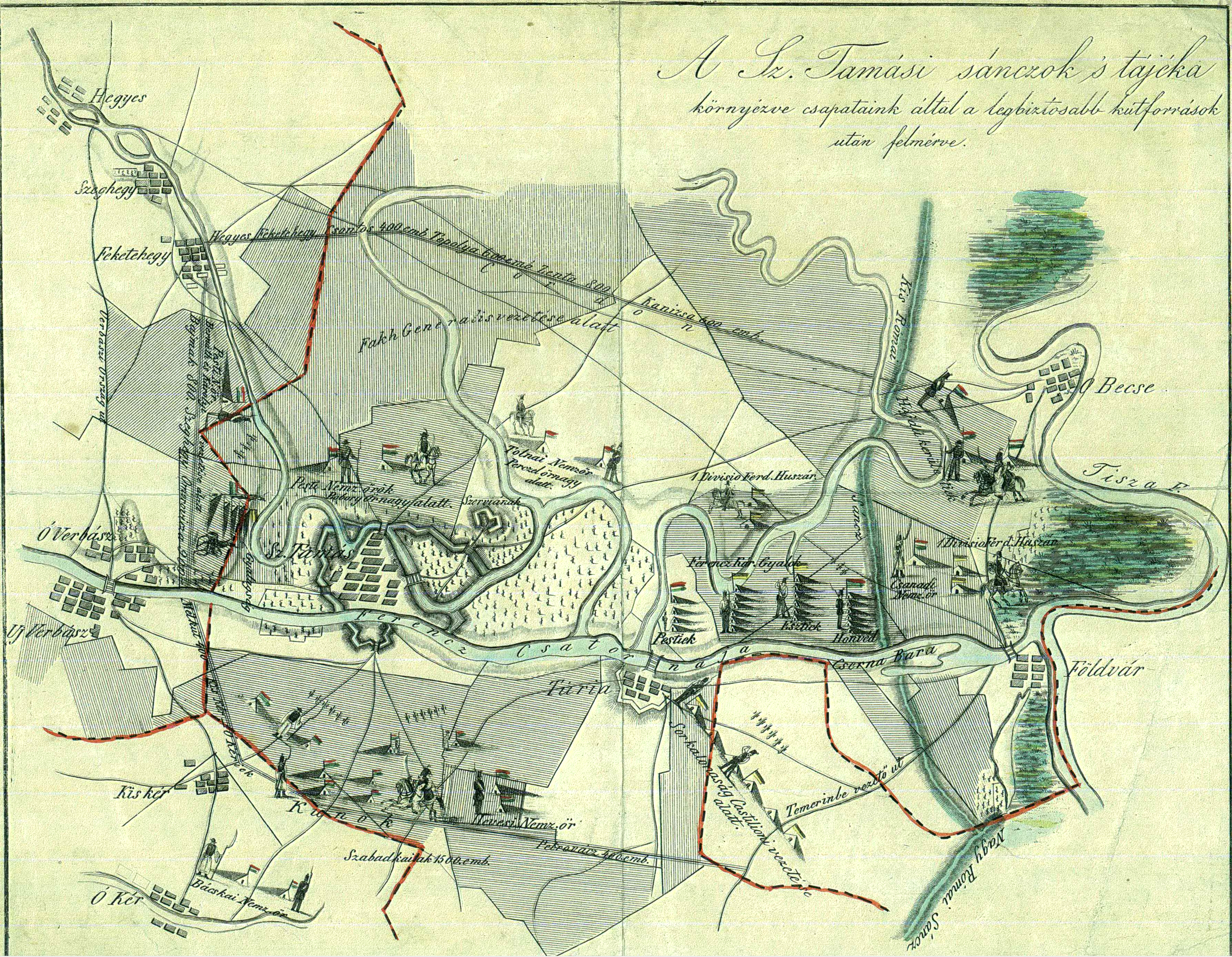
Szenttamás with the surroundings, military encampments and troops in the summer of 1848

The plan was primarily to attack, from the right bank, under the fire support of the mortars, the bridge over the Ferenc Canal; at the same time the battle would also begin on the left flank, and Fack's brigade had to advance and all troops had to continue their operations according to the opportunities occurred during th

According to Klauzál's plan, the Serbian fortified camp had to be attacked simultaneously and surprisingly by all Hungarian columns from several directions, and in order to have the greatest chance of success, the three columns had to assemble around midnight on 21 September and to attack before the dawn. Mészáros, on arriving at the assembly point, found the troops in disorder and not fully prepared. It took him some time and great difficulty, to get them into order, then finally the troops departed. But during the march, they lost their way. Because of all these problems, it was only after dawn by the time the troops reached Szenttamás. At sunrise, however, a thick fog descended, which obstructed the troops' view and orientation. The army advanced from Óverbász on the north bank of the Ferenc Canal, and the right column crossed it to the right bank of the canal (probably, on the mobile bridge sat up earlier) at a suitable distance from Szenttamás.

After the right column had crossed the canal, Mészáros ordered Colonel Kollowrath to conduct reconnoiter with all the cavalry in the direction of the Szőreg entrenchment and the Roman ramparts, to prevent the enemy's approach, or if it came near, to repel it.

== Siege ==
The cannonade began at about 5 1/2 o'clock in the morning, and continued, more or less vigorously, until 2 1/2 o'clock in the afternoon.

Then a battalion was designated as an assault column, with orders to besiege the Pétervárad bridgehead; while the Székely border guard battalion was ordered by Mészáros to advance as far as the bank of the canal, there to draw the enemy's attention by firing, and at the same time to serve as a reserve for the assaulting battalion. This reserve battalion reached the canal probably somewhere around the floodgate, abreast with the Verbász entrenchments. However, as we shall see below, its deployment heavily backfired, causing the failure of the attack against the Verbász entrenchments.

According to György Klapka, only a quarter or a fifth of the army was engaged in the actual attack, while the rest of the troops were deployed in a long line along the entrenchments and were left in inactivity.

As soon as the firefight was underway on the right bank, it started on the left bank as well, but prematurely, against the commander's intention. On the left bank of the canal, the center column under Bakonyi and the left column under Aulich were advancing.

The first to engage the enemy was Bakonyi's column, which soon drove back the enemy's vanguards from the vineyards; Bakonyi then began to besiege the ramparts, but suddenly his flank came under fire.

Unfortunately, the Székely battalion sent by Mészáros, in the thick fog mistook Bakonyi's troops for the enemy, and shot at them from the right bank of the Ferenc Canal, as a result of which Bakonyi ordered a retreat. Then Bakonyi repeated the attack against the entrenchments, but the Székely battalion shot in his troops again. As, because this friendly fire, the troops had lost several officers and soldiers, and believing that there was enemy on their right flank, Bakonyi retreat with his troops 800 paces, and began to shoot the entrenchments with his 12-pound battery.

Meanwhile, Aulich was leading his troops against the enemy dug in the forest's trenches in front of the town. Under Aulich, on the left flank, the 5th squadron of the 2nd Battalion of the Wasa Regiment began the attack; but after the overwhelming force repulsed it, the 4th squadron joined the assault column, and together they renewed the assault. However, the attackers were stopped by the Serbian defenders' fire and the wide swamp in front of them. Although the 12-pounder battery's guns aimed well, the long distance between them and their target prevented them from penetrating the ramparts at 800 paces. The Hungarian cavalry of this column did not join the battle, but stood back and fed their horses, although if they had joined the battle, the outcome might have been more favorable for the Hungarians. For all these reasons, Aulich losing his belief in the success of the attack, ordered his column to retreat immediately. Aulich withdrew his troops back 1000 paces after losing 7 men.

The fog had not yet lifted by 8 a.m. When the fog finally began to lift, Mészáros ordered another attack. He himself writes that he gave this order also because he saw that the morale of his troops was very low and he thought that with this order he could raise it. According to the eyewitnesses, the very low fighting spirit of the besieging army, which was evident throughout the day mainly among the officers and crew of the line regiments, was largely due to the widespread belief that the army led by the Ban of Croatia Josip Jelačić, who was then already marching towards Pest deep inside the Hungarian territory, could only attack Hungary with the consent of the Royal-Imperial Court, and thus among the K.u.K. officers assigned to the Hungarian army, a belief began to take root that their participation in the fights against the Serbs could not be according to the Emperor's intentions.

In the meantime, the firing on the right bank had ceased. To spur the right column to further action, Mészáros decided to ride over to the right bank. But his subordinates failed to float the mobile bridge closer to the troops, so the commander had to ride at a fast gallop for half an hour to cross to the troops on the other side.

On the other hand, although he ordered Aulich to advance abreast with the other troops, but in order this to have an effect, the operations on the right bank had to succeed first. Because of this, the different columns began to wait for the success of the others to launch their own attacks. Mészáros wrote this in his memoirs: Each part was waiting for the success of the other so that it could contribute to it. The hesitancy of the troops to fight was also due to the fact that Hungarian cannonballs and grenades were unable to set fire to the church tower of Szenttamás, from where the Serbs could easily observe the movements of the Hungarian army.

In contrast to the lack of fighting spirit of the Hungarian troops, the fighting morale on the Serbian side was excellent, and the Serbian women contributed to this. The women encouraged the fighters by singing national songs. The houses that were set on fire by the cannon fire were put out by women, who spread blankets dipped in water on the roofs of the houses. Some of them cooked lunch and fed the fighters. The children picked up the cannonballs that fell inside the town, and carried them to the church, to the ammunition store.

It was a long wait before the Hungarian guns on the right bank finally started to shoot again, giving the Hungarians some new hope. But right at this time 3000 Serbs arrived from Csurog. When at Csurog, Captain Mihajlo Jovanovic heard the shootings of the cannons from the direction of Turia, he put one of the Pétervárad border guard battalions and 6 cannons on carts and rushed to the aid of Szenttamás. But not only he but also Melentije Budimirović left the closed entrenchment from Szőreg during the morning with part of his troop and a 3-pound gun and advanced to the aid of the Serbs of Szenttamás. This also shows that in vain did Mészáros send troops to occupy the Szőreg ramparts, but they apparently did not show up, which allowed the Serbs from there to send a relief unit to help Szenttamás.

The fact that the Serbian relief troops were able to approach Szenttamás was the fault of the cavalry led by Colonel Kollowrat, whose task was to secure the back of the attackers and prevent enemy attempts to relieve the fortified camp.

The relief troops were almost captured by the Hungarians when at about 10 a.m. their guns started to shoot from the direction of Turia, so the Serb border guard troops formed up in battle formation and advanced against the Hungarian troops besieging the Pétervárad bridgehead. The besieging Hungarian battalion instead of advancing against them as a whole, turned its right flank backward and tried to stop the Serbs only with them, while the rest continued to face the defenders from the bridgehead.

The 1st Hussar regiment made a few successful attacks against the attacking border guards and held back their advance for a while. But the infantry battalion was unable to prevent the relief troops from entering Szenttamás through the bridgehead. - Now all the hopes of capturing Szenttamás were lost.

As seen above, it seems that no Hungarian attack on the ramparts of Szőreg happened. Colonel Fack, sent against the ramparts of Szenttamás which lie in the direction of Óbecse, reported that he had withdrawn his unit because of the threat of a larger force from the direction of Turia, which is why he burned the bridge from there. The cause of this was probably that the Colonel had been informed of the advance of the 2nd Serbian border guards Battalion and he feared that they would cut off his retreat. To prevent this from happening, he abandoned the demonstration against the Óbecse battlements and retreated to Óbecse without being pursued.

Soon afterward, Mészáros ordered his troops to retreat and abandoned any ideas of attacking again. The troops retreated in the afternoon.

== Aftermath ==
According to Ödön Olchváry, the Hungarian loss was 20-30 dead, but he points out that other reports speak about more than 100 dead soldiers - among them 2 officers. Of the infantrymen of the Alexander regiment, 18 were killed and 22 wounded. The Székelys had also many losses. Of the Hussars, 25 horsemen were killed. According to historian József Bánlaky, the Hungarians suffered only 20-30 casualties, and the Serbs perhaps even less.

After the unsuccessful third siege of Szenttamás, the fighting in both Bácska and Bánát began to diminish; it seems as if both sides were simultaneously waiting for the outcome of Josip Jelačić's attack against Hungary, and only after then to determine their own conduct according to the positive or negative result; thus the Ban's invasion shifted the focus of the war from Southern Hungary to the vicinity of Buda and Pest.

It was in this sense that Lajos Kossuth was more and more of the opinion that in the South, which now became a secondary scene of the war, the Hungarian army should fight delaying actions with smaller forces, and with the bulk of its forces to fight against the more dangerous enemy: the troops of Jelačić. Moreover, the concentration of the imperial armies around Vienna by Field Marshal Alfred I, Prince of Windisch-Grätz's, with the express intention of breaking into Hungary after finishing off the revolt in the imperial capital, was even more evidence of the correctness of Kossuth's plan and of the need to concentrate all the disposable forces along the upper Danube.

However, the Serbian leaders, but especially the Austrian Consul in Belgrade Colonel Ferdinand Mayerhofer von Grünhübel, who was now doing everything to turn the Serbian troops, which had hitherto been fighting for national interests, into imperial auxiliaries fighting for Austrian interests - and for this purpose trying to get rid of Lieutenant Đorđe Stratimirović, the most ardent champion of Serbian national interests - sought to ensure that the Serbs would attack Szeged with all their forces at the same time as Josip Jelačić, which would undoubtedly have been a powerful support for the Croatian Ban's campaign. However, due to various obstacles, the Serbs' attack did not begin until mid-October, when Jelačić's troops were no longer in the country after their defeats at Pákozd and Ozora.

Because of Jelačić's attack, until the end of the year, the Hungarian troops remained almost completely passive in Bácska and did not even attempt to attack Szenttamás again. Only on 29 November did they launch an attack to take the Szőreg entrenchments near Szenttamás, but the attack, which was carried out with 8 companies of infantry, one company of cavalry and 4 cannons, was repulsed by the Serbs.

=== Causes of the defeat ===
Antal Vetter, one of the generals of the Hungarian War of Independence of 1848–1849, describes the three failed sieges of Szenttamás from the year 1848: 14 regular infantry battalions, 18 hussar companies, 48 guns. In addition to this, about 20,000 national guardsmen.[...] The failure of the three sieges of Szenttamás was due not so much to a lack of troops or insufficient numbers, but only to some wrong measures and other reasons. Vetter notes that it was the duty of the chiefs of the general staff to assess his own and the enemy's strength, the terrain's obstacles, difficulties, and the distribution of troops; but above all, he should have kept the plan of the attack secret. They had to organize the intelligence and the reconnaissance so that before the battle the general staff would have been aware of the real situation and not fumble as they did every time. Vetter also points out that Mészáros sent too few troops against the Pétervárad bridgehead the key to the city, which, according to the general, could have been taken by attacking with 10 infantry battalions, and it would have been enough to use the other 4 battalions in other places. He points out that the artillery would also have had to be used in greater numbers against the bridgehead. Most of the cavalry would have been deployed in the southern part, to cut off the Serb retreat if the entrenchments were taken. Once the artillery had achieved the required success, the infantry would have been required to charge. However, Vetter argues that during the decisive right bank attack on the bridgehead, the Hungarian infantry should have also attacked on the left bank.

Vetter summarizes the causes of the failure of the siege of Szenttamás: If the attack is made in this manner and with the required vigor, it could not have resulted in anything but a victory; but where the orders are miserable, and the commanders are not only lacking enthusiasm but also goodwill, there is lost even the hope of a favorable outcome.

To this, historian Ödön Olchváry adds that out of the 14,000 infantry and 2,000 cavalry at his disposal, Mészáros only brought 9,000 infantry and 1,500 cavalry to Szenttamás. Just like Philip Bechtold at the time of the second siege of Szenttamás, Mészáros left a good part of his troops at Ókér, Kiskér, Futak and Óbecse. These small forces were not only too weak to be unable to initiate military actions on their own but were not adequate for defensive purposes either. But if they had remained with the main force, they could have increased its numbers and could have been decisive in taking Szenttamás. According to Olchváry, the argument that these troops were left in different places to protect the population from possible Serbian raids does not hold water. Instead, the inhabitants should have been led to safety with their valuables and the whole army should have been deployed against Szenttamás, he wrote.

The other important cause of the defeat was the despondency in the army and the uncertainty of the non-Hungarian imperial officers - but also of many of the Hungarians - and the uncertainty of the non-Hungarian troops about which side to take, which was further intensified by Jelačić's attack against Hungary because they realized that the Croatian Ban had crossed the Hungarian border with emperor Ferdinand's consent. They did not know which to obey: the Hungarian government or the Emperor, for they had sworn their military oath of allegiance to both. According to Olchváry, Lázár Mészáros's mistake was that, despite his strong Hungarian sentiments and patriotism, he was not firm enough to force the wavering officers to remain with the Hungarian cause. He was not a steady man, and when the situation demanded severity, he would have preferred to persuade the wavering men instead of ordering them. Without this, no one can be a successful general. That is why there was no order and discipline in the army from the very beginning. The disorder during the assembling of the soldiers before the start of the marching towards Szenttamás, the feeding of the horses by the hussars during the battle, and the lax execution of orders, all prove this, Olchváry wrote.

Mészáros felt his weakness. The public's expectations and confidence in him made him accept the command of the army out of a sense of duty, but he felt no calling to it. Mészáros considered Lieutenant-General Bechtold a better commander than himself, which is why did not change the latter's dispositions about the fragmentation of the army, so instead of keeping it together, he weakened the army, sending small units to different places, in the same way as Bechtold. And since this third siege of Szenttamás also failed - henceforth he wanted afterward to confine himself to defense in Bácska.

== Sources ==
- Bánlaky, József (2001). A magyar nemzet hadtörténelme ("The Military History of the Hungarian Nation) (in Hungarian). Budapest: Arcanum Adatbázis.
- Bona, Gábor. Az 1848/49-es szabadságharc tisztikara. Budapest: HM Hadtörténeti Intézet és Múzeum. ISBN 9789638564580.
- Bóna, Gábor (1987). Tábornokok és törzstisztek a szabadságharcban 1848–49 ("Generals and Staff Officers in the War of Freedom 1848–1849") (in Hungarian). Budapest: Zrínyi Katonai Kiadó. p. 430. ISBN 963-326-343-3.
- Hermann, Róbert (2001), 1848-1849 a szabadságharc hadtörténete ("Military History of 1848-1849") (in Hungarian), Budapest: Korona, ISBN 963-9376-21-3
- Hermann, Róbert (2004). Az 1848–1849-es szabadságharc nagy csatái ("Great battles of the Hungarian Revolution of 1848-1849") (in Hungarian). Budapest: Zrínyi. p. 408. ISBN 963-327-367-6.
- Olchváry, Ödön (1999). A magyar függetlenségi harc 1848-1849-ben a Délvidéken (in Hungarian). Budapest: Márkus Samu Könyvnyomdája.
