= Battle of Karlóca =

First battle of the Hungarian War of Independence 1848

Coordinates: 45°10′59.7″N 19°56′29.6″E

- Part of the Hungarian Revolution of 1848
Date	12 June 1848
Location	Karlóca, Syrmia, Kingdom of Hungary
Result	Serbian victory

Belligerents
Hungarian Revolutionary Army	Austrian Empire: Serbian Vojvodina

Commanders and leaders
János Hrabovszky; Maximilian Eugen von Stein	Đorđe Stratimirović

Strength
~ 1,000	~ 5,000–6,000

Casualties and losses
8	211

The Battle of Karlóca (now Sremski Karlovci, in the South Bačka District of the autonomous province of Vojvodina, Serbia) was the first battle in the Hungarian War of Independence of 1848-1849, fought on 12 June 1848 between the Hungarian Royal Army under the command of Lieutenant-General János Hrabovszky and Major Maximilian Eugen von Stein against the Serbian insurgents led by Lieutenant Đorđe Stratimirović. The Hungarians tried to suppress the movement by an attack against the main basis of the Serbians, Karlóca. After initial successes, the Hungarians, fearing of encirclement, retreated to Pétervárad. This action, instead of putting down the Serbian revolt, had the result of inciting it even more, causing its widening during the next months.

== Background ==
Following the civil transformation of March–April 1848 in Hungary, called the Hungarian Revolution of 1848, after a few months of peace, the Serbs, the Croats, the Transylvanian Romanians, and some of the Slovaks living in Hungary and Transylvania, made territorial and national demands and sought to ally themselves with the Habsburg emperor, hostile to the Hungarian state.

A common feature of the Croatian, Serbian and Romanian movements was that they also had substantial, well trained armed forces of their own. The population of the Military Frontier lands (Croatian Military Frontier, Slavonian Military Frontier and Transylvanian Military Frontier) established in the southern and eastern parts of the country in the 18th century, was predominantly Croatian, Serb and Romanian, and the Hungarian government had to promise not to change the military internal structure of the Border Region for the time being. These border guards (see Grenz infantry) constituted an armed force that could vigorously sustain these nationalities' demands. The leaders of the border guard regiments were committed to the person of the emperor and to the unity of the empire, and they were able to exploit the illusions of this peasant population about the good emperor.

However, the petition adopted at the 27 March meeting of the Serbian community in Újvidék (Novi Sad) did not reflect this sentiment. It demanded the recognition of Serbs as a nation and the abolition of the serfdom in the border regions. However, when their delegates appeared in Pozsony, proeminent Hungarian politician and the Minister of Finance of Hungary Lajos Kossuth made it quite clear to them on 9 April that they could not expect to be recognized as an independent nation because in political terms there was only one nation in Hungary, the Hungarian nation - that is, the "Hungarian" nation, which united the citizens of different languages. A member of the delegation, Đorđe Stratimirović, said that they would then look elsewhere for the fulfillment of their demands, to which Kossuth is said to have replied, Then the sword will decide between us. Kossuth later denied that the exchange had taken place, and the opinion of the Hungarian historians is that this dialogue could be later invented to serve as a Serbian propaganda ploy.

In the Border Region, there was already a rather anti-Hungarian sentiment, and the participants in the popular assemblies there demanded accession to the non-existent "Triune Kingdom" (formed by Croatia and Slavonia, which belonged to the Hungarian crown, and Dalmatia, governed from Vienna). At the meeting in Karlóca (Sremski Karlovci) on 14 April, the Serbs in the south of the region demanded the creation of the autonomous Serbian Vojvodina. But it is far from certain that the decisions of this meeting were influenced by the incident from Pozsony, in which, as seen above, Kossuth would have declared supposedly that the sword shall decide between the Serbs and Hungarians. All the more so, because this demand had already been made at one or other of the Serbian meetings held during the Serbian delegation's visit to Pozsony. The participants in the Serbian national rally in Karlóca on 13–15 May have now called on the Serbian population to take up arms. The demands were supported, not so secretly, by the Principality of Serbia's government in Belgrade, whose agents in southern Hungary and Bosnia were simultaneously trying to foment an uprising for the creation of a unified southern Slav state.

The situation in the South was exacerbated by the arrival of thousands of volunteers from the Principality of Serbia, called "Servians", to help their brothers. Their participation had a decisive influence on the mood of the Karlóca assembly and the genocidal ferocity of the armed struggle that began in mid-June. The main armed base of the struggle, however, was the military of the Serbian border regiments of the Slavonian Military Frontier.

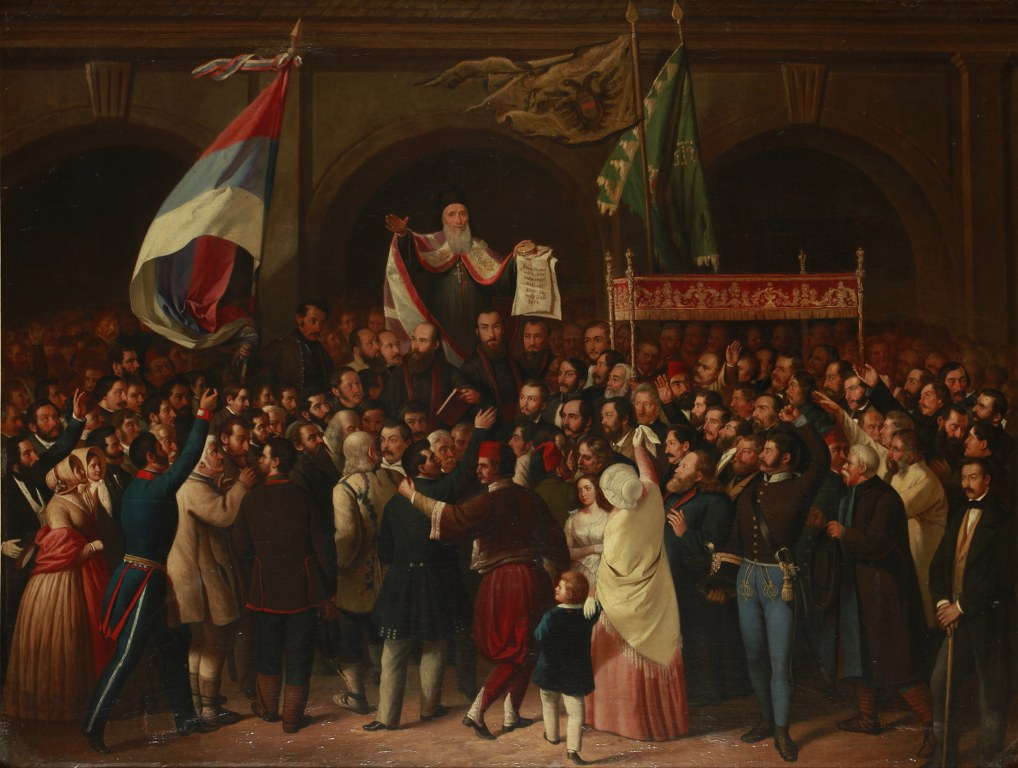
The May Assembly 1848 in Karlovác (Sremski Karlovci)

In 1848 Karlóca became the center of the Serbian movement in May 1848. Karlóca was a free military town in 1848, in the border district of Pétervárad (Petrovaradin). Until the end of the World War I, it was the seat of the Serbian head of the church, the patriarch (Josif Rajačić in 1848), and one of the intellectual centers of the Serbs in Southern Hungary (the first Serbian high school in Hungary was opened in Karlóca in 1791). Until 1848 - as a border town - it was outside the jurisdiction of the Hungarian civil authorities.

The Serbian Assembly in Karlóca on 13–15 May established the Serbian Main Committee (Odbor), followed by the formation of various district and local committees in late May and early June. In addition, the assembly in Karlóca decided that Syrmia with the border region, the counties of Baranya and Bács with the district of the Šajkaška (Csajkás), and the whole Temes County and its border region would be part of the Serbian voivodeship to be established, offered an alliance to Croatia, undertook to stand up for the rights of the Transylvanian Romanians, refused to hold the ecclesiastical assembly planned by the government at Temesvár, and sought to submit the demands of the Serbs directly to the Habsburg king by bypassing the Hungarian government. In this way, they declared their secession from Hungary. First Archbishop Josip Rajačić was elected president of the Main Odbor, and after his resignation, Đorđe Stratimirović. Stratimirović had previously served as an officer in the imperial army, so he knew the way to organize an armed force. In early June, Rajačić himself traveled to Zagreb, where he concluded an alliance with the leader of the Croatian movement, Ban Josip Jellačić, who was also anti-Hungarian.

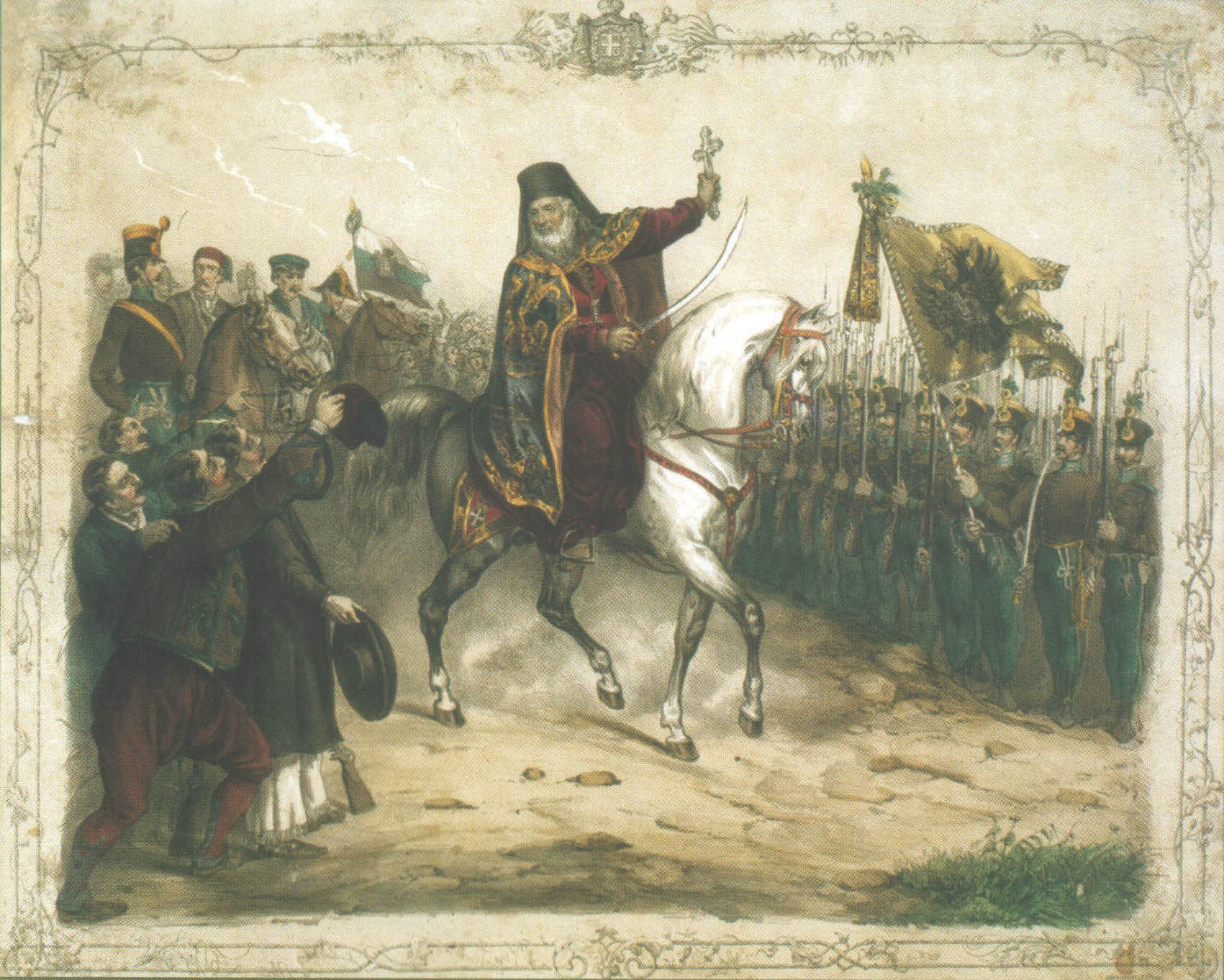
Patriarch Rajacic blessing the Serbian troops fighting against the Hungarians

When the news of the events in Karlóca reached Pest, Archduke Stephen the Palatine of Hungary immediately sent a decree to Rajačić, in which he held him responsible for the consequences of the Karlóca meeting. In reply, Rajačić openly stated that he had no intention of holding the church meeting announced by the government in Temesvár, which was to support the agreement with the Hungarians. In the face of all this defiance and the activity of the Obdor, the royal commissioner Péter Csernovics did not show sufficient vigor, which is why the government, leaving only Bácska to him, appointed Sebő Vukovics, the deputy of Temes County, as the royal commissioner of Bánság. This measure, however, did not bring the desired success either; the Obdor, and especially its chairman, Stratimirović, who was its strongman, worked with untiring persistence to widen the military resistance. The main result of his work was that by mid-June three regular Serbian fortified camps had been established along the Danube and Tisza. One of these, under the command of Drakulić, a former lieutenant colonel appointed by the Main Obdor, and consisting of about 3,000 armed men, was assembled on the left bank of the Tisza, near Perlasz (Sr. Perlez). Another camp was founded by the Obdor's agents to secure the patriarch's seat on the right bank of the Danube between Karlóca and Újvidék. The number of armed men in the Karlóca camp in early June was 5,000–6,000. The third camp, under the command of Joannović, who had been appointed Colonel by the Obdor, was established at Temerin, the crossing point of the so-called Great Roman ramparts between Bácsföldvár and Ujvidék, and the Little Roman ramparts, which ran from Bácska to Titel for about 8 miles. The core of this was the battalion of the Šajkaši (Hung. Sajkások) of Titel, which joined the Main Obdor, and provided the necessary cannon and ammunition. On 6 June, the Šajkaši led by Zaria Jovanović, took 8 cannons from the armory in Titel and marched into the Roman trenches. The strength of these fortified military camps was multiplied day by day by the fugitives from the counties of Bács and Torontál, although Commissioners Csernovics and Vukovics set up a patrol line of national guards to prevent it.

== Prelude ==
On 24 May, Đorđe Stratimirovič (1822-1908), a former lieutenant in the imperial army and president of the Main Odbor, called on Serbs to arm themselves and collect donations, and shortly afterward (on 4 June) he ordered the troops of the border regiments to join the uprising. The number of armed men in this camp was initially 3,000, but later - with the fraternization of the regular border guard troops - it reached 15,000. The existence of the Serbian camp in Karlóca was a problem for the commander-in-chief of the army in Pétervárad, Baron Lieutenant General János Hrabovszky. Their fortified position was a threat to the fortress of Pétervárad, and their geo-strategic position could have been used to obstruct navigation on the Danube and postal traffic.

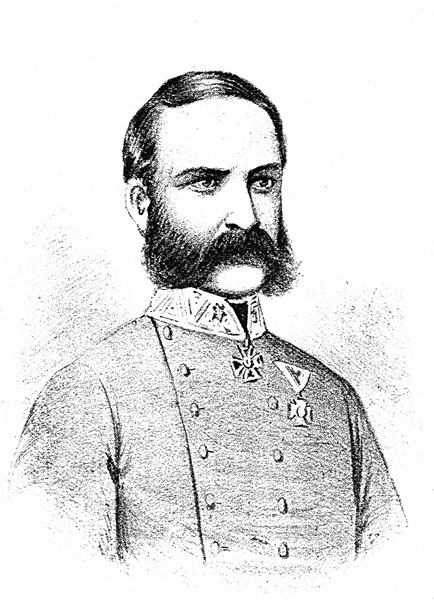
Ðorđe Stratimirović, drawing, ca. 1875

The raiding troops of the camps threatened mainly Becskerek (Sr. Zrenjanin), Újvidék, and the district of Becse (Sr. Bečej), and to counter this the royal commissioners ordered national guard troops to move to all these places until the arrival of the regular army. But they were doomed to inaction for the most part, after the General Military governorates had strictly instructed them not to cross the picket line set up between the counties and the military border regions outskirts under any circumstances, as Lieutenant-General Baron Piret stated in his letter to the Hungarian government of 6 June, to avoid any violent action which could cause unforeseeable confusion. As a result, the Serbs had the opportunity to prepare for the incoming attack, fortifying their camps and providing them with the necessary food and military supplies. On 8 June, the Hungarian government ordered Lieutenant-General János Hrabovszky, the commander-in-chief of the Slavonia and Syrmia regions, to put an end to the increasingly dangerous movement and to disperse if necessary the Main Odbor from Karlóca even by force of arms. On 10 June, however, the Main Odbor sent a delegation to Hrabovszky in Pétervárad, complaining that the Hungarian national guards were threatening to attack the Serbian villages of Bács and Bánság, and thus asked the Lieutenant-General to protect the Serbs on behalf of the Emperor, since, the delegation concluded, he was serving not only the Hungarian Ministry but also the Emperor. To this Hrabovszky replied, with military firmness and resolution, that he saw no place for the protection requested since it was the Serbs who were disturbing the peace, and as soon as they ceased to be restless and obeyed, peace would be restored everywhere. As to their patents, he does not know them; but he knows that Serbia and the political Serbian nationality do not exist on the map of Hungary, or even of the whole monarchy, and he believes that those who are zealous for the Serbian political nation would do well to go to Serbia, where that nationality rules. With these words, Hrabovszky added fuel to the fire, and the Serbs' attitude became even more threatening.

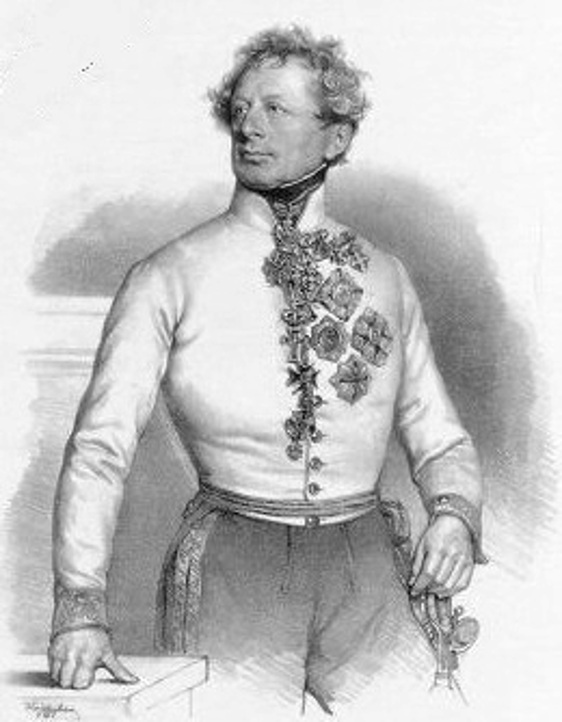
Hrabovszky János

For the time being, Hrabovszky did not want to use force against the rebels. Firstly, because he was in favor of reconciliation and a peaceful solution; secondly he feared that the attacked rebels would call on the help of the soldiers of Serbian origin serving in Italy, as well as the border guards from this region, and he considered this an unusual catastrophe. Hrabovszky was not a supporter of the Hungarian revolution and the democratical changes, which followed it, but after the emperor ordered him to comply with the Hungarian government's decrees and saw the Serbs as a threat to the interests of the Empire, he decided to take a firm stand against the rebels.

On June 12, 1848, the troops under the command of Colonel David Kräutner von Thatenburg set off from Pétervárad at 3 o'clock in the morning. Who effectively commanded these troops was Captain Miksa Stein (1810-1860). His detachment consisted of 8 infantry companies: from the 39th Don Miguel and the 32nd Franz Ferdinand d'Esté Infantry Regiments seven companies; and one company of the Landwehr battalion from Pétervárad, 46 horsemen of the Imperial Hussars (forming one of the wings) and a six-pounder battery. These troops were mostly composed of Hungarians. This totalled 1,100 people. Hrabovszky's orders were for a military column to march to Karlóca, but at the same time, under Józseffalvalva (Hr. Josipovac)... a more vigorous demonstration is to be made. Hrabovszky was prepared for one last eventuality. He ordered Captain Miksa Stein that "... if the insurgents are willing to reconcile, they should be given time to discuss [with the Hungarians]", and that hıs troops should only use weapons if they were attacked. Beside Stein's troops, at the same time, Hrabovszky sent a column of some 5,000 men against the Roman trenches.

The Serbian troops from Karlóca, according to Đorđe Stratimirović's memoirs consisted of 2,000-3,000 ill armed peasants from Bácska and Syrmia, a "semi-regular" Syrmian battalion and 2 companies of the 3d Pétervárad border guard battalion.

Karlóca lies on the right bank of the Danube, 5-6 kilometers from Pétervárad, at the eastern foot of the Fruška Gora (Hung. Fruskagóra) Mountains, on the side of a high plateau with fruit trees and vines, in four converging small valley gorges. Between the mountain range and the Danube, there is an 8–900 m wide valley. The whole road from Pétervárad to Karlovác runs over on a mountainside.

== Battle ==
The advance guard of the detachment had two guns, and the Serbian-speaking officer in charge of the advance guard was given the task of trying to get the Serbs to reconcile. Without a fight, the detachment occupied the entrenchment built by the rebels towards Pétervárad and then marched towards the city. When Hrabovszky's detachment arrived in front of the town the Serbian armed force consisting of thousands of border guard soldiers, volunteers, and Servians (volunteers coming from Serbia), was carrying out exercises in a field on the southeast side of the town. The Serbs' surprised commander-in-chief, Đorđe Stratimirović, was at first about to leave the town without putting up any resistance, but then, having changed his mind, and quickly gathered the Servians positioning them behind bushes at the north-western edge of Karlóca, and on the roofs of houses, then he rushed to the troops assembling on the high ground at the south-eastern exit of the town to regroup them. According to Straimirović's memoirs, he sent the two companies of border guards from Pétervárad to the beerhouse, which lied over a very deep canyon towards Pétervárad, but himself went to the opposite direction, to the field, along the road to Zimony, to regroup the peasants who run away. Straimirović writes that when he turned back to Karlóca, he found the border guards he sent to the beerhouse in the city. When he asked why did they not stick to his order, they said that a royal-imperial officer went to them, and said that he (Straimirović) called them back. The Serbian commander sent them back to the beerhouse. He considered this a Hungarian military trick to enable them to capture the city.

When the Hungarian troop's vanguard marching in battle-readiness searched the row of houses outside the barriers of the toll-house, they found the buildings abandoned and locked. Then suddenly, from the thatched roofs and hedge fences, a company of Serbian insurgents from Zimony (Sr. Zemun) opened a vigorous fire on the Hussars, led by Stein, riding at the head of the Hungarian detachment, and the Serbian troops hid behind the first houses, suddenly charged against them. The Hussars rushed back to bring help. The Hussars reported that the settlement was "covered in flames from shells", with fires visible in 14 places; one Hussar and three infantrymen were killed. Hrabovszky then sent a battalion of infantry to Zimony on a steamboat requested from the Steamship Office to stop the attacks from there. And he also wrote to Colonel Ernő Kis to Kikinda to march with his soldiers to Óbecse, and there to await his orders.

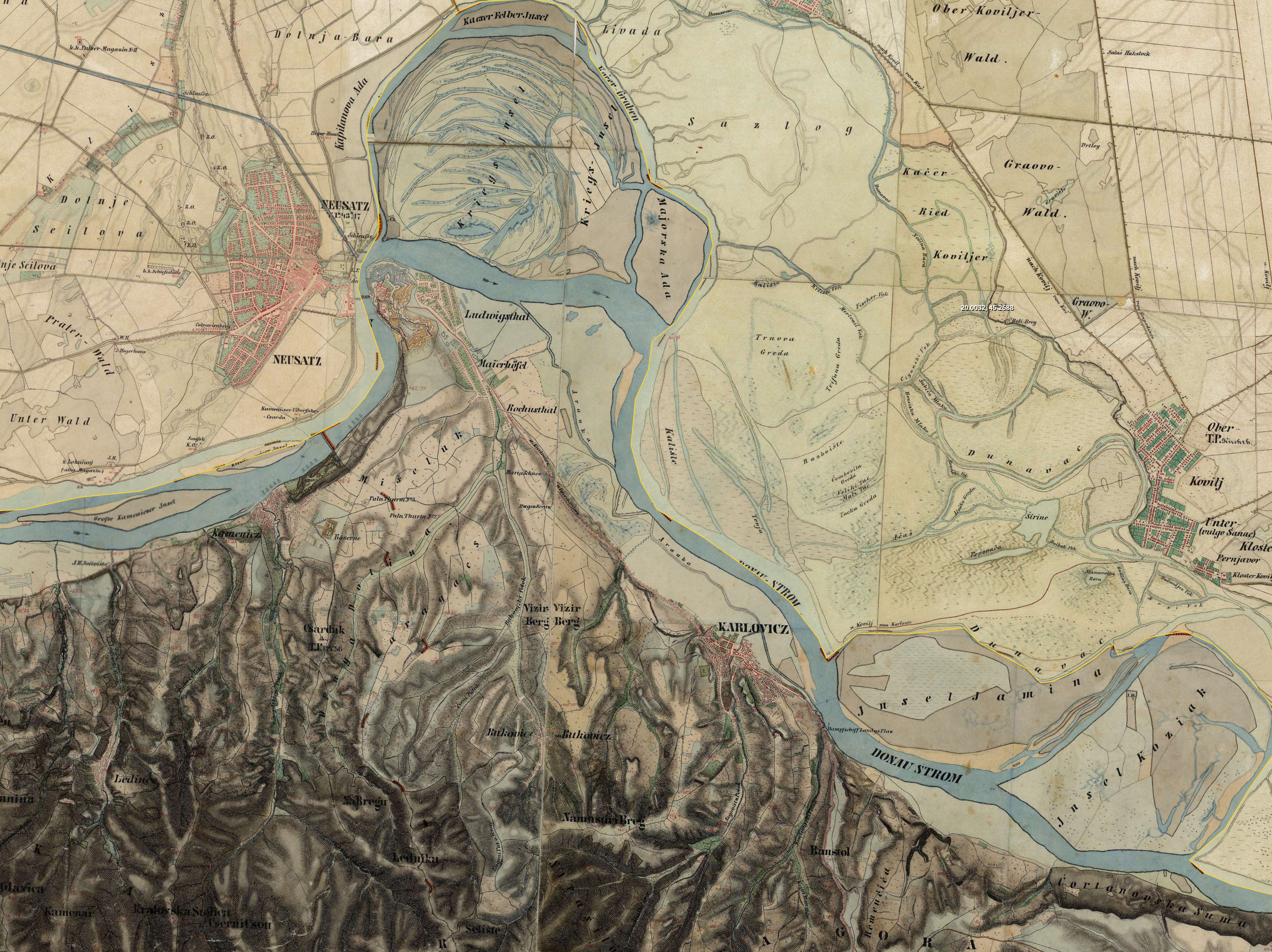
The region of Western Syrmia between Pétervárad and Karlóca in the 19th century

The secretary of Péter Csernovics reported that at 10:30 a.m. they brought in the 22 years old Lieutenant Weinhengst, who had been shot above the heart. When he was taken down from the chariot, he said, I count it my glory that I was the first to be wounded in defense of my country. And soon he died.

Stein waited for the infantry to arrive and then took the lead of the first company to advance. The two cannons assigned to the vanguard, unlimbered on the street and fired grapeshots at the Serbs, scattering them. The Hungarian main troops had deployed to fight, and after the town had been set on fire at several points by the Hungarian artillery's shells, The whole city was then in flames, except for two towers. The Hungarian infantry, broke with a bayonet charge into Karlóca, pushing back the Servians and the other Serbian troops, which came to their aid. Seeing that the battle started to turn on the Hungarian side, the pro-imperial Colonel Kräutner, assigned to the Hungarian troops, completely handed over command to Stein, saying that it was against his convictions to participate in such murderous arson. Some of the infantry led by Stein bypassed the Serbs' left flank, while the others drove the Serbs on the plain before them into the city. At 11 a.m. the soldiers, with a bayonet charge, took the town, while the cavalry, turning towards the Danube's bank, pushed onto the market square. At 11:30 am, the Hungarians brought two captured wagons and 23 prisoners into the Hungarian camp, most of whom were over 60 and under 18 years old. Some of the Serb rebels surrendered, while others retreated to the church and the archbishop's palace, where they waited for the Hungarians in defensive positions. The Hungarian troops began to besiege them with cannons and soldiers. In the fierce fighting at 12:30 pm, the Hungarians had 6 dead and 5 seriously wounded. Among the dead was a Hussar lieutenant. Among the Hungarians, Lieutenant Gáspár Halasi, after being wounded on his right arm, had it bandaged and then continued to fight, taking his weapon in his left arm. The Serbians too showed heroic acts. For example, according to Straimirović's memoirs a dozen of peasants from Bácska and Pincéd armed only with clubs, attacked the Hungarian cannons installed at the aforementioned beerhouse, and put them to flight.

Until 4 o'clock in the afternoon, there was a ceasefire, and food was delivered from the castle to the army. At 4:45, Count Albert Nugent, the commissioner of the Croatian Ban Josip Jelačić, arrived and immediately began negotiations with Lieutenant-General Hrabovszky. At 5 p.m. the fighting resumed.

The Main Odbor and the Serbian troops left the city, but the attack did not reach its goal, because the commanders of the Hungarians, did not pay attention to the heights west of the city, concentrating only on capturing Karlóca. When the battle started, the Serbians rang the church bells, heard by the national guards from Bukovac. At 8 o'clock the news arrived that these approached from the direction of the heights. Stein intended to attack these insurgents gathering on the southeastern heights of the city, but they threatened to cut off the Hungarians' retreat route, bypassing, along the heights, the city from the northwest.

The leaders of the Hungarians, fearing that they would be surrounded by the four times larger enemy, returned to Pétervárad with about 70 prisoners.

== Aftermath ==
The Serbian rebels did not chase them, but retreated in the mountains, leaving behind some 60 dead and wounded, While the Serbians retreated towards Kamencia, the Hungarian troops set camp near Maria-Schnee. Some sources put the total number of insurgents killed at around 300, with 6 of the military killed and several wounded.

This punitive operation carried out with inadequate forces was just fuel for the fire. Hrabovszky did the worst possible thing: he infuriated the Serbs without showing sufficient force to suppress the movement.

The next day after the battle, the Serbian Main Odbor from Karlóca issued the following proclamation, calling all Serbs to the arms:

Serbian nation! The decisive hour has come; the enemy of our nationality has sent against us from Pétervárad troops with cannons, which with a stratagem advanced under Karlovac, and under the orders of the bribed commander-in-chief Hrabovszky attacked our national troops; in this battle eleven men of the Serbs fell on the field of honor and glory, shedding their blood for our nationality, our name, our language, and our holy religion: Eternal be their memory and holy name before our nation forever! Fifteen soldiers of the savage and inhuman Hungarian army fell, whom the enemy took away in a chariot; but the fifteenth, not being place to be placed in the chariot, was stripped and his naked body left behind. Though the Hungarians have escaped, yet we are in great danger; for our national troops, in consequence of this unexpected incident, deprived of their commanders, have been partly scattered in the valleys, and partly left behind; and God knows what else the enemy may be planning against us, and whether our own will be able to resist the inhuman plans of our declared enemies. Our nationality is in the greatest danger, our name, our language, and our religion will be wiped out of world history and consigned to eternal oblivion, if every young man, old, rich or poor, who is able to bear arms, does not rush to Karlóca from everywhere, so that we may resist our enemies for our sacred rights, and build up our nationality on the ruins of the fortresses, towns and villages of the so-called Hungarian kingdom, and secure it for the centuries to come.

For the Serbs, the action signaled that the imperial-royal (K.u.K.) army was not acting with sufficient determination against them, and so their uprising could continue. According to Stratimirović, the border guards, the Pétervárad regiment and the Šajkaši battalion, which until then were reluctant to join the Serbian revolt, now joined him. A battalion from Pétervárad was ready to leave for Italy to fight against the Italian revolution, but because of the Hungarian attack from 12 June, they refused to obey, and because the K.u.K. officers were reluctant to side with the Serbs, a determined and popular sergeant, Bosnić, led the battalion to Karlóca and placed it at Stratimirović's disposal. So did also the Šajkaši. Several armed military ships, two of them with 8-8 guns under the command of Captain Surducki, who used to hold his annual summer exercises between Zimony and Belgrade, now sailed to Karlóca and came swear oath to Stratimirović. Furthermore, even some of the imperial troops joined the rebels. After the battle, the insurgents, the Servians, and the border guards established new fortified camps in Syrmia at Kamenic, Bukovac, Čerević, and Ilok; in Bácska at Szenttamás; and in the Bánság at Perlasz, Alibunár, Vračev Gaj, Ördöghidja. On 12–13 June, the border guards at the headquarters of the Pétervárad border regiment in Mitrovica, rioted, chasing away their officers. On 15 June, Stratimirović took the captured steamship "Danube" to Titel with 500 armed men, where he also forced the battalion of the Šajkaši from there to obey, although its commander, Major Molinari, strongly protested against this violent action. Stratimirović took away 2,000 rifles and several cannons from the arsenal there. After these events it became clear for the Hungarian commandment, that a larger force would have to be mobilized to put down the uprising.

== Sources ==
- Bánlaky, József (2001). A magyar nemzet hadtörténelme ("The Military History of the Hungarian Nation) (in Hungarian). Budapest: Arcanum Adatbázis.
- Bóna, Gábor (1987). Tábornokok és törzstisztek a szabadságharcban 1848–49 ("Generals and Staff Officers in the War of Freedom 1848–1849") (in Hungarian). Budapest: Zrínyi Katonai Kiadó. p. 430. ISBN 963-326-343-3.
- Hermann, Róbert (2001), 1848-1849 a szabadságharc hadtörténete ("Military History of 1848-1849") (in Hungarian), Budapest: Korona, ISBN 963-9376-21-3
- Hermann, Róbert (2004). Az 1848–1849-es szabadságharc nagy csatái ("Great battles of the Hungarian Revolution of 1848-1849") (in Hungarian). Budapest: Zrínyi. p. 408. ISBN 963-327-367-6.
- Olchváry, Ödön (1999). A magyar függetlenségi harc 1848-1849-ben a Délvidéken (in Hungarian). Budapest: Márkus Samu Könyvnyomdája.
- Peljach, István (1990), "Magyarok és szerbek a Délvidéken. Djordje Stratimirovic emlékirata 1848-1849-ről. ("Hungarians and Serbians in Southern Hungary. Djordje Stratimirovic's Memoirs from 1848-1849)" (PDF), Aetas, 5. évf. 1. sz. (in Hungarian)
- Vásárhelyi, Péter István (1980), "A karlócai ütközet. ("The Battle of Karlóca)" (PDF), Hadtörténelmi Közlemények, 27. évf. 3. sz. (in Hungarian)
