= Đorđe Stratimirović =

Officer in the Serbian and Austrian armies (1822–1908)

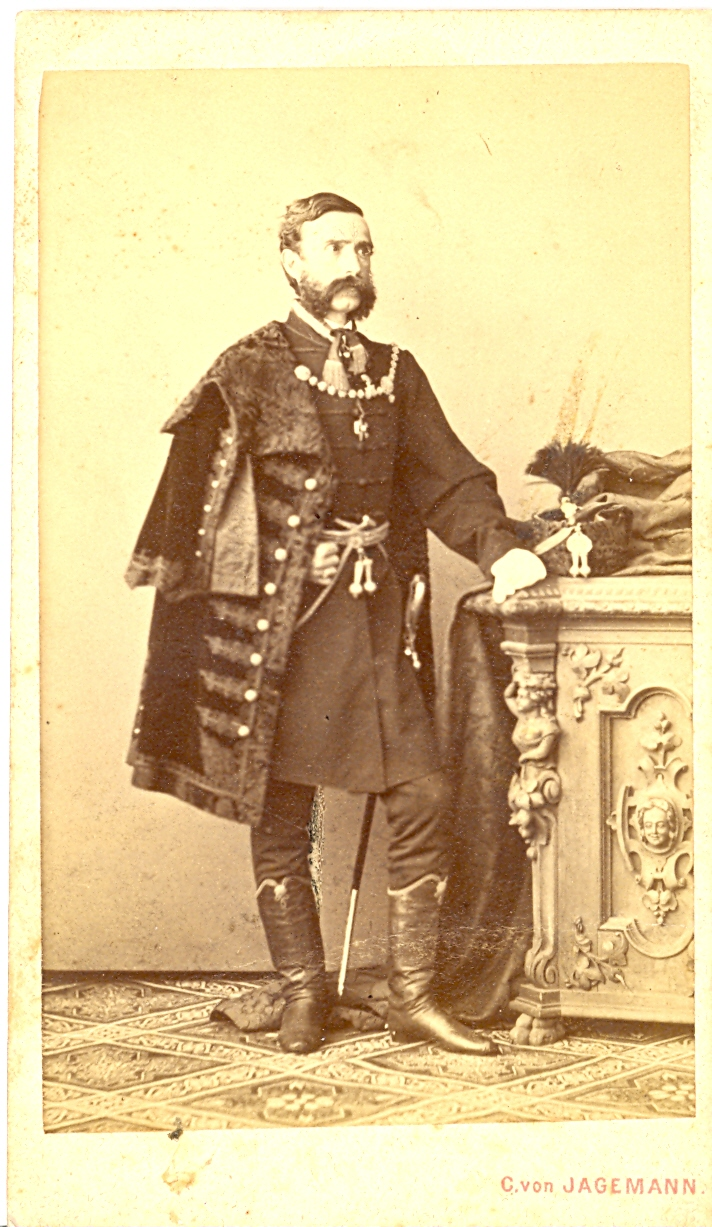
- Born: February 7, 1822; Novi Sad, Austrian Empire
- Died: December 15, 1908 (aged 85–86) Vienna, Austria-Hungary

Đorđe Stratimirović (7 February 1822 — 15 December 1908) was the commander of the Serbian army in the Serb uprising of 1848-49 and later a major general in the Austrian Armed Forces of the 19th century.

== Childhood and youth ==
Đorđe Stratimirović was born in Novi Sad on 7 February 1822 to Mr. and Mrs. Vasilije Stratimirović, a well-to-do landowner from Kulpin of noble birth. Đorđe received his first homeschooled in his parents' house by the priest Rohonji of Kulpin (Slovakia). His other private tutor was the distinguished writer Milovan Vidaković.Đorđe finished his high school education at a Lutheran school in Novi Vrbas (1832-1836) and then spent a year in the cadet corps studying mathematicians in Titel. He received his higher military education at the Military Engineering Academy in Vienna, between 1837 and 1841. After two years spent in the army in Italy, Đorđe was demobilized. For personal reasons, he left the military service in 1843 and settled in Kulpin, with his parents. He married a young noblewoman Maja Zakin Bajšanski. In Kulpin, as a landowner, he dealt with economics and studied legal sciences at a Military Academy there.

== Service in the army ==
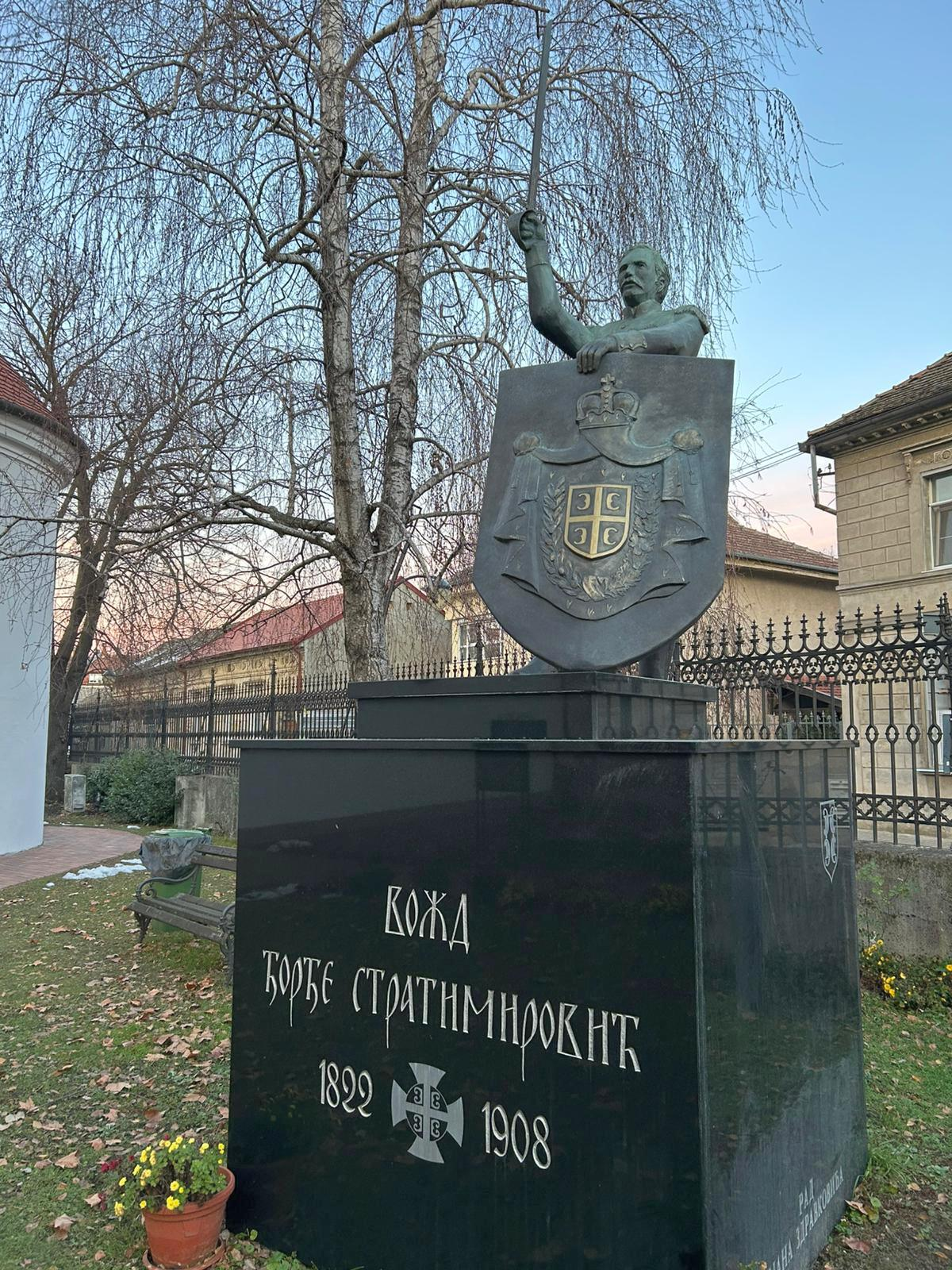
Monument to vožd Đorđe Stratimirović, Sremski Karlovci

After studying at the Military Academy, Đorđe Stratimirović joined the military again and became a lieutenant. He served in Milan, Pavia and other Italian cities. Then, in the period between 1843 and 1848, he became politically active among the Serbs of southern Hungary who demanded recognition as an independent nation with full language rights in internal affairs and to have their own legislative National Diet. Among them, he gained a place and a reputation as an eloquent speaker and leader. The idyllic life of the nobles, however, was interrupted by the turbulent 1848 Hungarian Revolution, whose supporters would deal with the conservative nobility and clergy.

Almost immediately Đorđe came to the fore when he clashed with the fiery Lajos Kossuth at the Hungarian Parliament in Požun. Lajos Kossuth was the national leader of the Hungarians, and Stratimirović wasted no time to remind Kossuth that the Serbs are looking for autonomy from the Habsburgs, but Kossuth's immediate reply was "once peace is restored", meaning then can further talk about autonomy be discussed. This, of course, was an unacceptable answer to both Stratimirović and other Serbian representatives. Later, Stratimirović would once again ask the same question, though Kossuth would consider a modified form of autonomy for the Serbs but not a complete one. That's when the Serbs and Stratimirović decided to go with the Austrian camp altogether. There was no compromise! The beginning of the revolution in 1848 found him in Novi Sad, where he was at the head of the Serbian movement. At the May Assembly in Sremski Karlovci, where Đorđe Stratimirović represented Kulpin, he was elected president of the Main Board of the Serbian people, which was supposed to lead the uprising. He became a retired lieutenant, the "military leader" of the rebel Serbs in Vojvodina. He worked on the creation of Serbian military camps and the organization of the Serbian People's Army. During the Hungarian-Serbian war, he won many victories as a military commander. Until the arrival of Voivode Stevan Šupljikac, he led all military affairs and was the central figure of the Serbian movement.

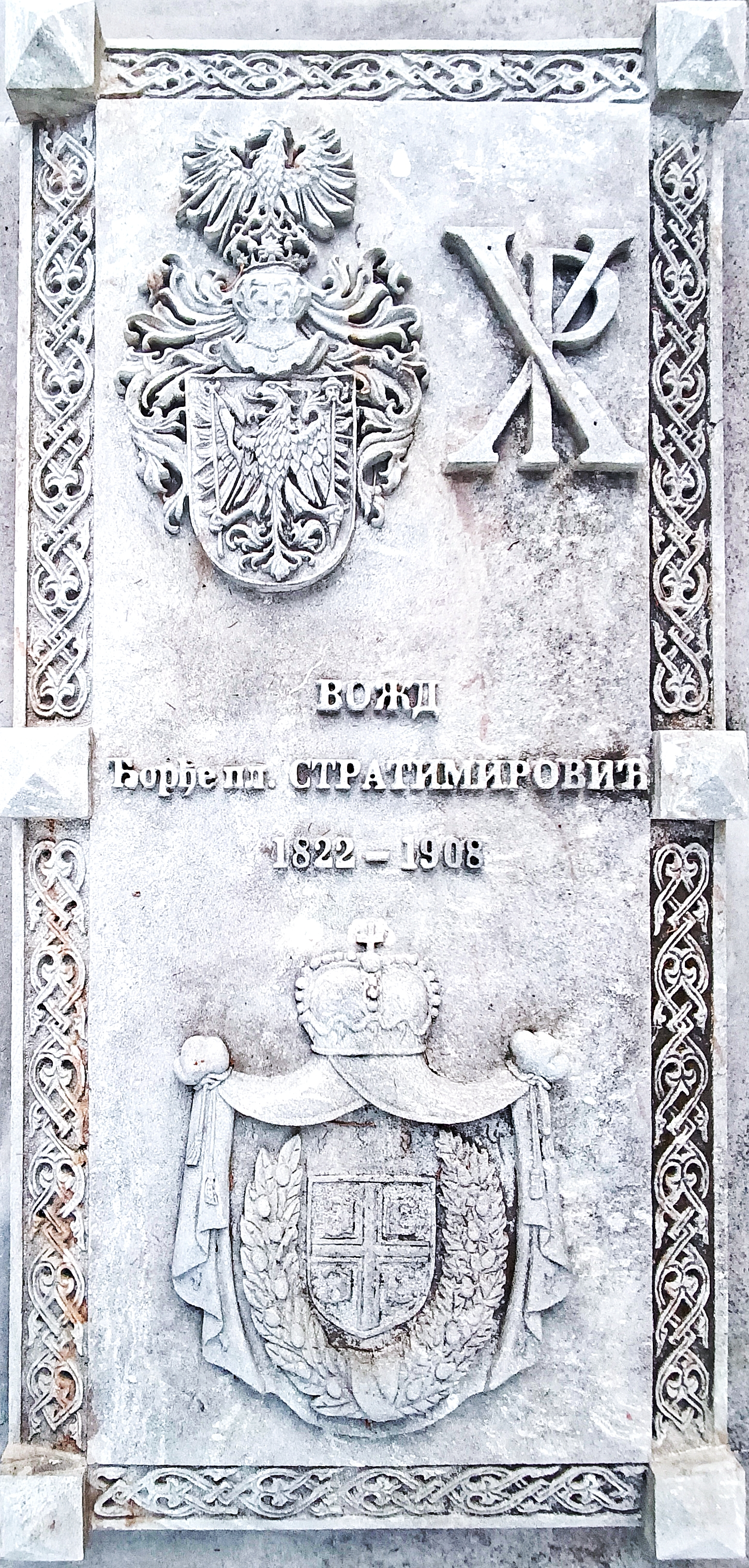
The gravestone on his grave

Standing at the head of progressive, democratic and anti-Austrian circles in Serbian citizenship, he came into conflict with Patriarch Josif Rajačić, the so-called "manager of the people". The patriarch used some failures of the Serbian military forces to remove Stratimirović from the position of a supreme military commander. With the victory of the counter-revolutionary and conservative current, led by Rajačić, Stratimirović's role in the second period of the movement was less significant. The commander of the Serbian People's Army was an Austrian man - Ferdinand Mayerhofer von Grünbühel (1798-1869) - and then came the Austrian Serb general, Kuzman Todorović.

After the collapse of the Hungarian revolution in 1849, Stratimirović once again joined the Austrian army and rose from the rank of cavalry lieutenant colonel to the rank of major general. He retired in 1859, and until then he performed confidential diplomatic missions for Austria in Montenegro, Corfu, Epirus, Serbia and Italy. He was twice a member of the Hungarian State Parliament in Požun, and several times a member of the Serbian People's and Church Parliaments in Karlovac. In the course of his political activity, he was engaged in writing and journalism.

Since 1873, he lived in Novi Sad. In the Serbian-Turkish war of 1876, he put himself at the disposal of the Serbian government, though suspected of working for the interests of Austria, he was obliged to leave Serbia.

Many of Stratimirović's political actions, especially the connection with the Hungarian emigration from the 1860s, i.e. with Czech politicians, the conspiratorial actions related to the solution of the Eastern Question, as well as the cooperation with the court in Vienna, have yet to be sufficiently clarified.

After 1877, he retired from public life and moved to Vienna, where he lived in seclusion until his death on 15 December 1908.

Stratimirović wrote an autobiography that was published in Serbian and German by his son Đorđe in 1913.

== Bibliography ==
- The Reforms in Turkey, Vienna 1856
- Memoirs of General Đorđe Stratimirović, Vienna-Zagreb-Leipzig 1913
- Žarko Dimić, Đorđe Stratimirović, Novi Sad, 2019
