= Autumn Campaign =

Part of the Hungarian War of Independence of 1848–1849

- Part of the Hungarian War of Independence of 1848–1849
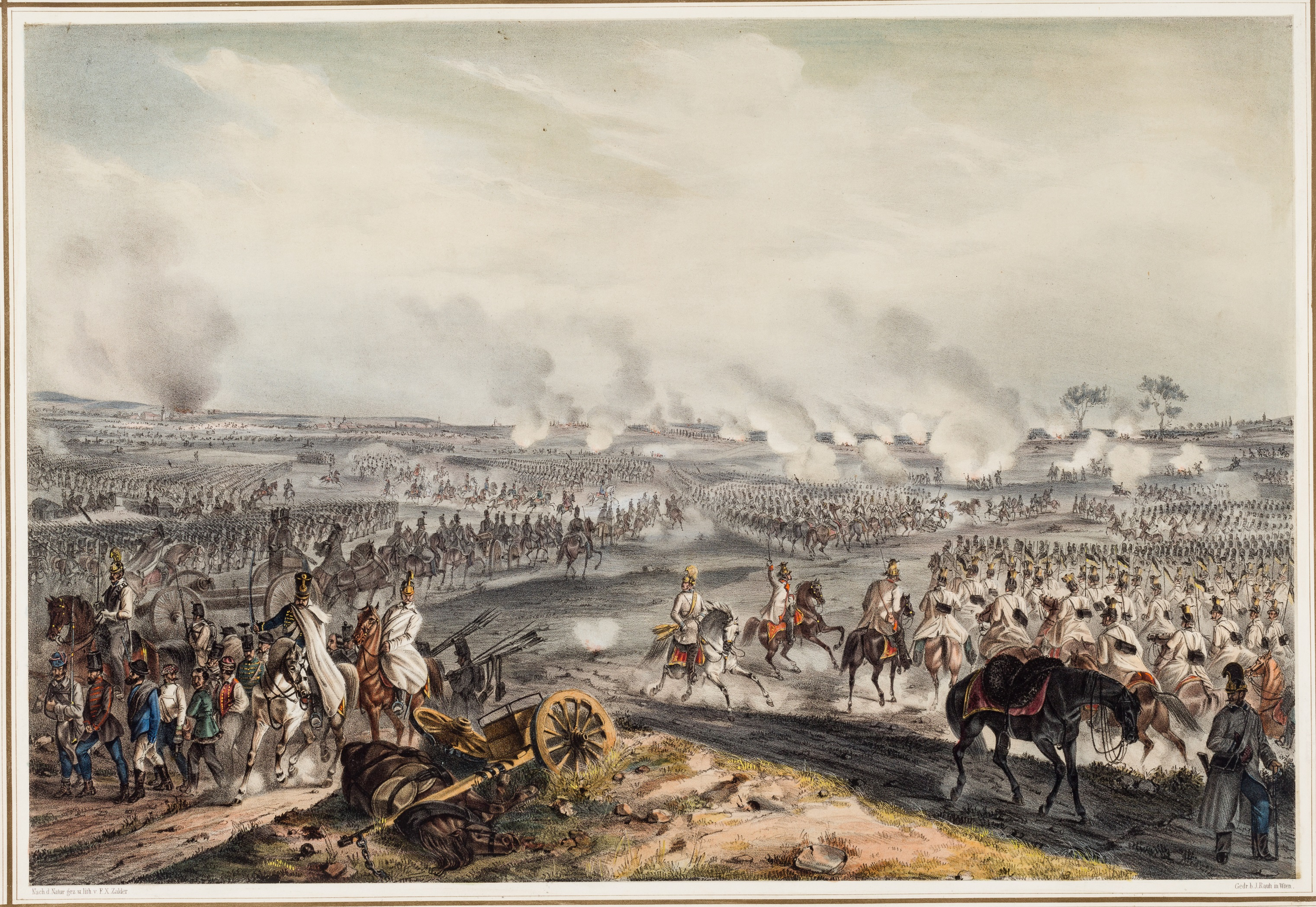
- Battle of Schwechat on 30 October 1848
Date	11 September – 5 December 1848
Location	Kingdom of Hungary, Principality of Transylvania (1711–1867) & Austrian Empire
Result	Inconclusive

Belligerents
Austrian Empire: Kingdom of Croatia; Serbian Vojvodina; Serb rebels; Pro-Habsburg Hungarians; Slovak National Council; Transylvanian Romanians; Transylvanian Saxons; Supreme Ruthenian Council; Czech and Moravian volunteers	Kingdom of Hungary: Legions of the revolutionaries from German states; Polish legions; Italian legions; Székelys; Hungarian Jews; Hungarian Germans; Hungarian Slovenes; Pro-Hungarian Slovaks; Pro-Hungarian Romanians; Pro-Hungarian Serbs; Pro-Hungarian Rusyns; Zipser Saxons; Croats from Western Hungary and Muraköz; Šokac and Bunjevac people; Banat Bulgarians

Commanders and leaders
(Austrian Empire) Ferdinand I of Austria; (Austrian Empire) Alfred I of Windisch-Grätz; (Austrian Empire) Anton Puchner; (Austrian Empire) Josip Jelačić; (Austrian Empire) Stevan Knićanin; (Austrian Empire) Avram Iancu; (Austrian Empire) Ľudovít Štúr	(Kingdom of Hungary (1526–1867)) Lajos Kossuth; (Kingdom of Hungary (1526–1867)) János Móga; (Kingdom of Hungary (1526–1867)) Artúr Görgei; (Kingdom of Hungary (1526–1867)) Ernő Kiss; (Kingdom of Hungary (1526–1867)) Mór Perczel; (Kingdom of Hungary (1526–1867)) Sándor Gál

The Autumn Campaign refers to the series of military campaigns and revolts during the autumn of 1848 in the Kingdom of Hungary, Principality of Transylvania (1711–1867), Lower Austria, Duchy of Styria, and Syrmia during the Hungarian War of Independence of 1848–1849. In the fall of 1848, the Hungarian army successfully repelled the Croatian offensive led by Lieutenant General Josip Jelačić at Pákozd. The Hungarians then attempted to support the revolution in Vienna, but they were defeated by the Austrians at Schwechat. Meanwhile, the Serbian uprising in southern Hungary continued, and Austrian troops led by Lieutenant General Anton Puchner revolted in Transylvania. With the support of the Romanian rebellion, the Austrians drove the Hungarian units out of the province. However, these battles reinforced the combat value of the Hungarian troops and the experience of the young Hungarian officers. This greatly contributed to stopping the Austrian winter offensive that began in December.

== Background ==
When the Batthyány cabinet took power in April 1848, Hungary had no army. The April Laws did not improve this situation, and the imperial army stationed in Hungary remained under Vienna's control. Local Austrian high commandments, such as the one in Buda, ignored the Hungarian Government's orders until May, when royal decrees formally subordinated them to the Hungarian government—though their loyalty remained doubtful.

Prime Minister Lajos Batthyány sought to replace foreign troops with Hungarian regiments serving abroad, but Vienna blocked the return of the Hungarian troops, keeping in Hungary the foreign units, loyal to the emperor. Meanwhile, the 12 Points of the March 15 revolution demanded a Hungarian National Guard, which was created and by summer numbered 350,000–380,000 men, though most were poorly trained and their service time was very short. To build a real force, the government had to create real military battalions, which, by autumn, together with the few Hungarian units from abroad that had returned, formed the basis of the Honvéd (Defenders of the Homeland) Army. By the year's end, there were 66 honvéd battalions, many led by former imperial officers, foreign volunteers, and Hungarians.

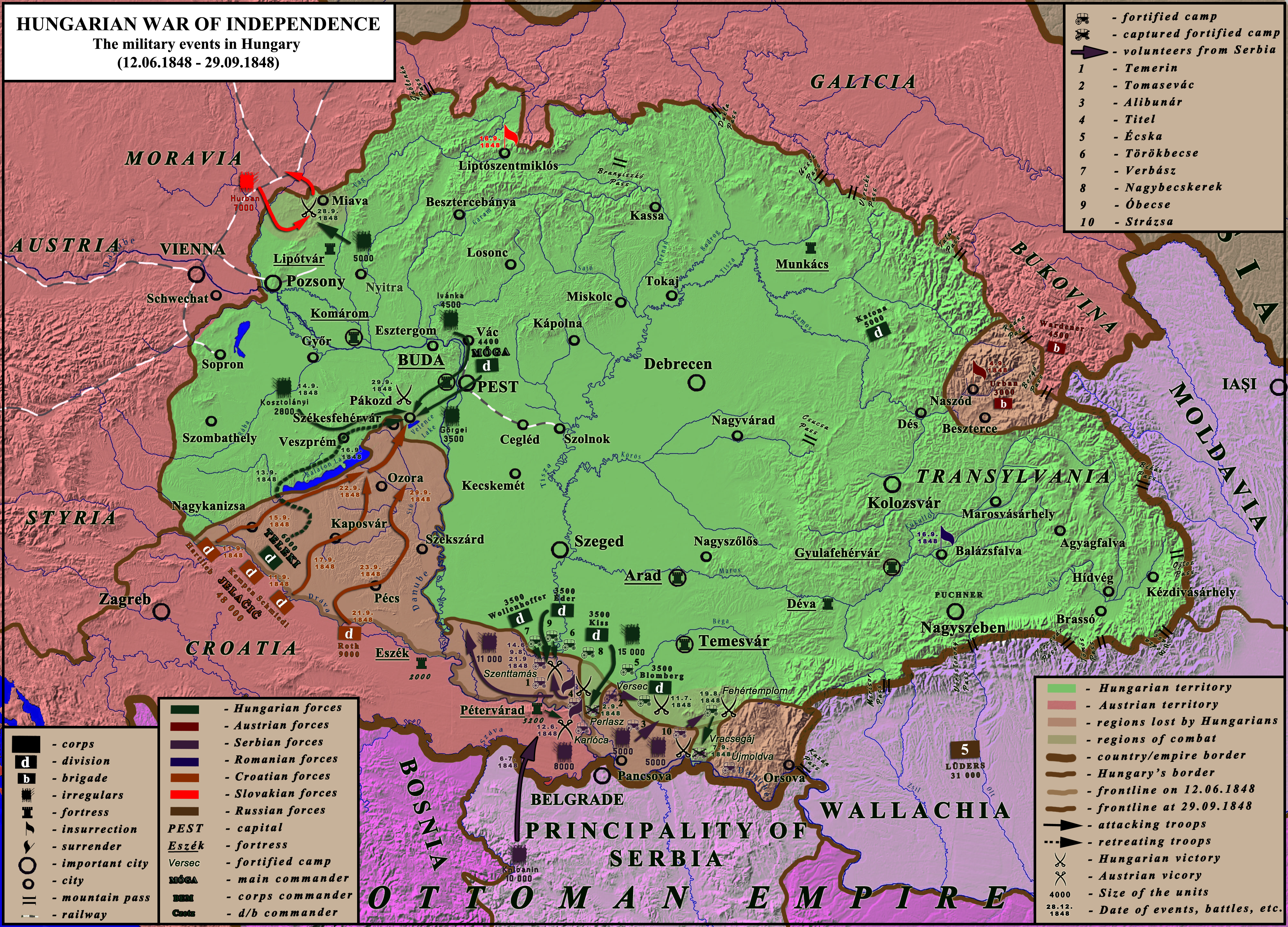
The military situation in Hungary between 12.06.1848 and 29.09.1848

Ethnic tensions complicated recruitment. The Serbs in the south, rejecting Hungarian nationhood, declared a Serbian Vojvodina in May and began an armed uprising, supported by volunteers from Principality of Serbia. The Serb regiments from the Military Frontier joined the revolt. Fighting was brutal, marked by massacres. On 12 June 1848, with the Battle of Karlóca, the war against the Serb insurrection started, but the foreign units and officers, who at the beginning were sent to fight the Serbs, were outnumbered and also unwilling to fight. The Serbs set up fortified camps as strongholds against the Hungarian troops. The most important Serb fortified camp was Szenttamás (Srbobran), which was besieged three times by Hungarian troops, but without success. The first notable Hungarian success was the Battle of Perlasz on 2 September, resulting in the capture of that fortified camp.

At the same time, Croat leader Josip Jelačić, supported by Vienna, refused to recognize the April laws and severed ties with Pest, and prepared for war with Hungary.

In Transylvania, the union with Hungary was proclaimed in June, but Romanians and the Transylvanian Saxons rejected it. Their discontent, combined with imperial support, fueled anti-Hungarian movements.

Despite these conflicts, non-Hungarian participation in the Honvéd Army was significant: Slovak, Romanian, and German units fought alongside Hungarians. Some of the most famous generals, like János Damjanich (Serb), Károly Knezich (Croat), and Lajos Aulich (German), were themselves non-Hungarian.

Under pressure from the revolutions in Italy, Galicia, Vienna, and Prague, the Habsburg government pretended to support the Batthyány government until August. Meanwhile, they secretly supported the Serbs who were rebelling against Hungary and encouraged other nationalities to do the same. After the uprisings in the Austrian hereditary provinces were crushed and the Italian troops were defeated in the Battle of Custozza, however, the Austrian government became increasingly hostile towards the Hungarian government.

== Actions on the main theater ==
=== Jelačić’s attack ===
In late August, Lajos Batthyány and Ferenc Deák traveled to Vienna. The Austrian response to the Hungarian government's offers to negotiate was a sharp ultimatum sent to Pest, demanding the abolition of the independent Hungarian ministries of finance, war, and trade.

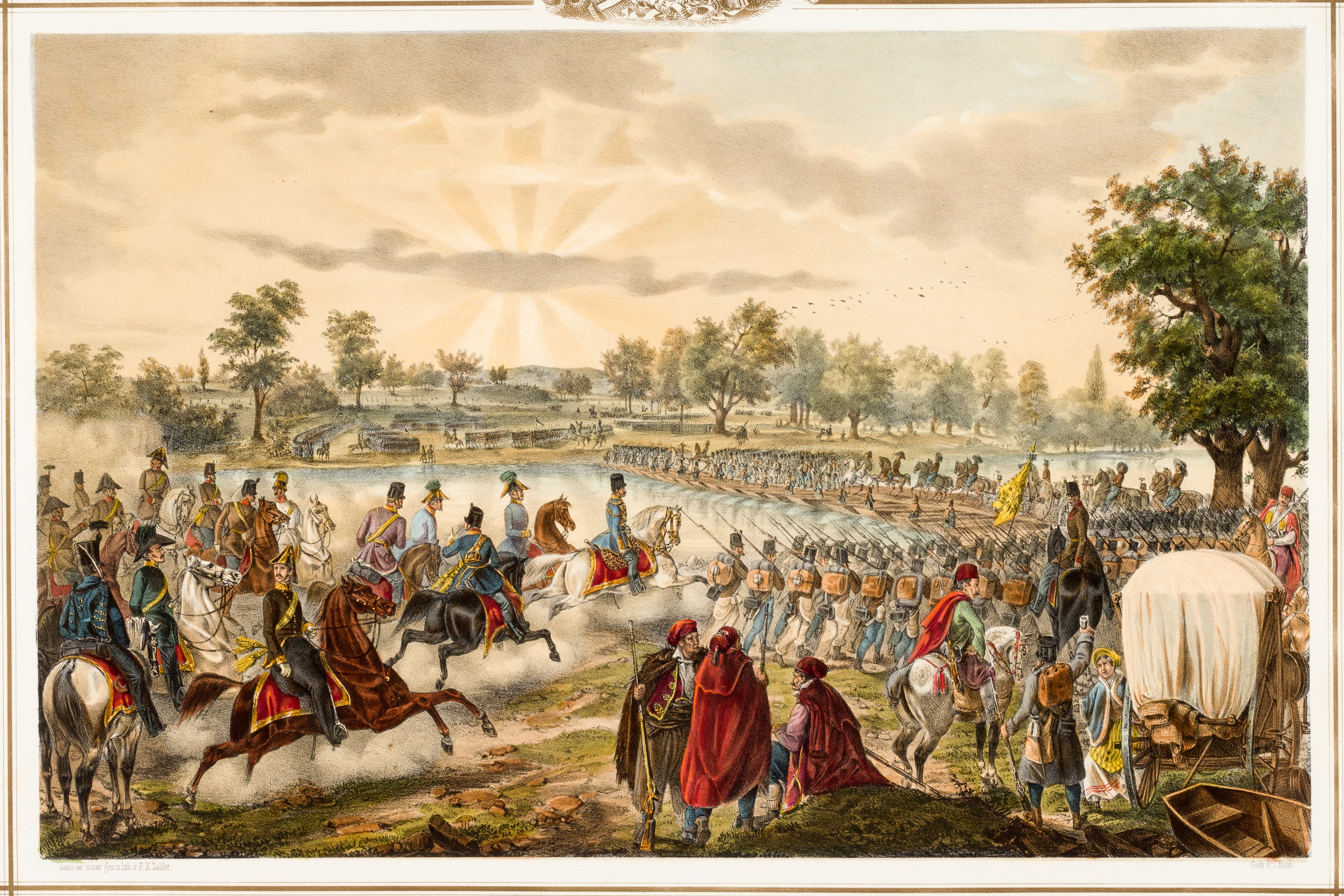
Crossing of the Mura river by the Croatian army at 11. September 1848 Franz by Franz Xaver Zalder

It turned out that Vienna saw the time as ripe for a unilateral and, if necessary, violent revoking of the April laws. As a result of this, the Batthyány government resigned on 11 September 1848.

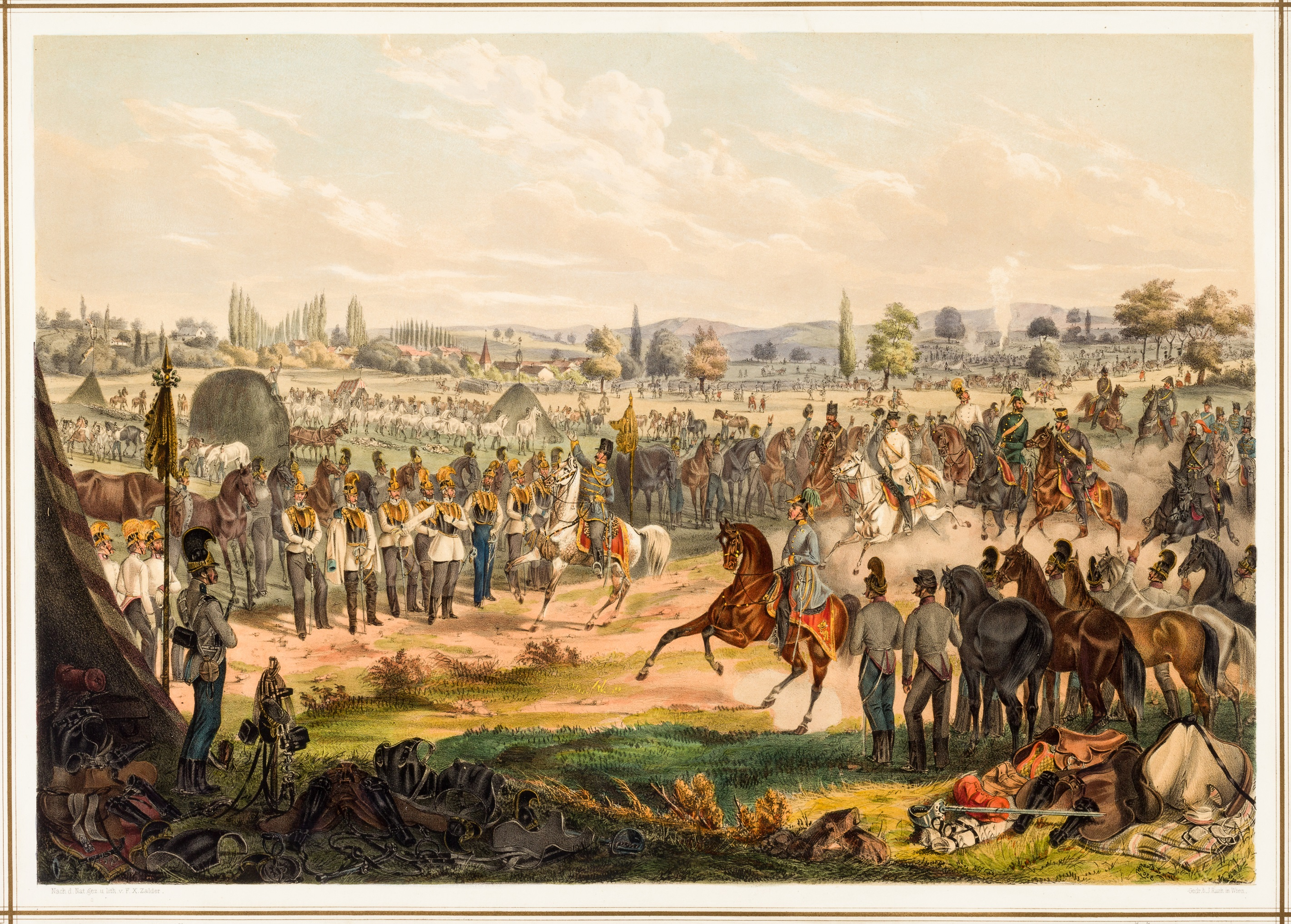
The Kres 1st Major's Division of the 7th (Kress) Light Cavalry (chevau léger) Regiment joins the army of Josip Jelačić, at 19. September 1848 by Franz Xaver Zalder

The crisis caused by the resignation of the government was resolved when Palatine Stephen entrusted Batthyány with the temporary leadership of the executive powers and the formation of a new government on 12 September.

In the early hours of 11 September 1848, the Croatian army of nearly 50,000, led by Ban of Croatia, Lieutenant General Josip Jelačić, crossed the Drava River, which formed the Hungarian–Croatian border. After the occupation of the Muraköz, the Croatian troops crossed the Mura River on 14–15 September and advanced towards the north-west. His troops invaded Hungary not under Croatian, but under Habsburg imperial (black and yellow) banners. The K.u.K. units, consisting of foreign soldiers stationed in Hungary joined immediately the Ban's army. By forcing the Hungarian government to resign, the imperial court hoped that Hungary would be unable to resist the enemy.

General Ádám Teleki, the commander of the Hungarian army in the Dráva region, declared that the resignation of the Batthyány government meant that there was no legal authority in Hungary at the moment, so he refused to confront Jelačić's army. This grave situation was saved by the intervention of a group of Hungarian officers. On 16 September, their delegation visited Jelačić and asked him to show them the imperial decree which authorized him to attack Hungary. Since the Ban could not provide such a thing, they declared that they would confront him with arms. However, it was uncertain whether it would be possible to gather the necessary armed force to be able to stop his large army. Batthyány and his colleagues, however, did their best to raise a Hungarian army capable of fighting the Croatian army in the few days they had at their disposal.

==== Unsuccessful negotiation attempts ====
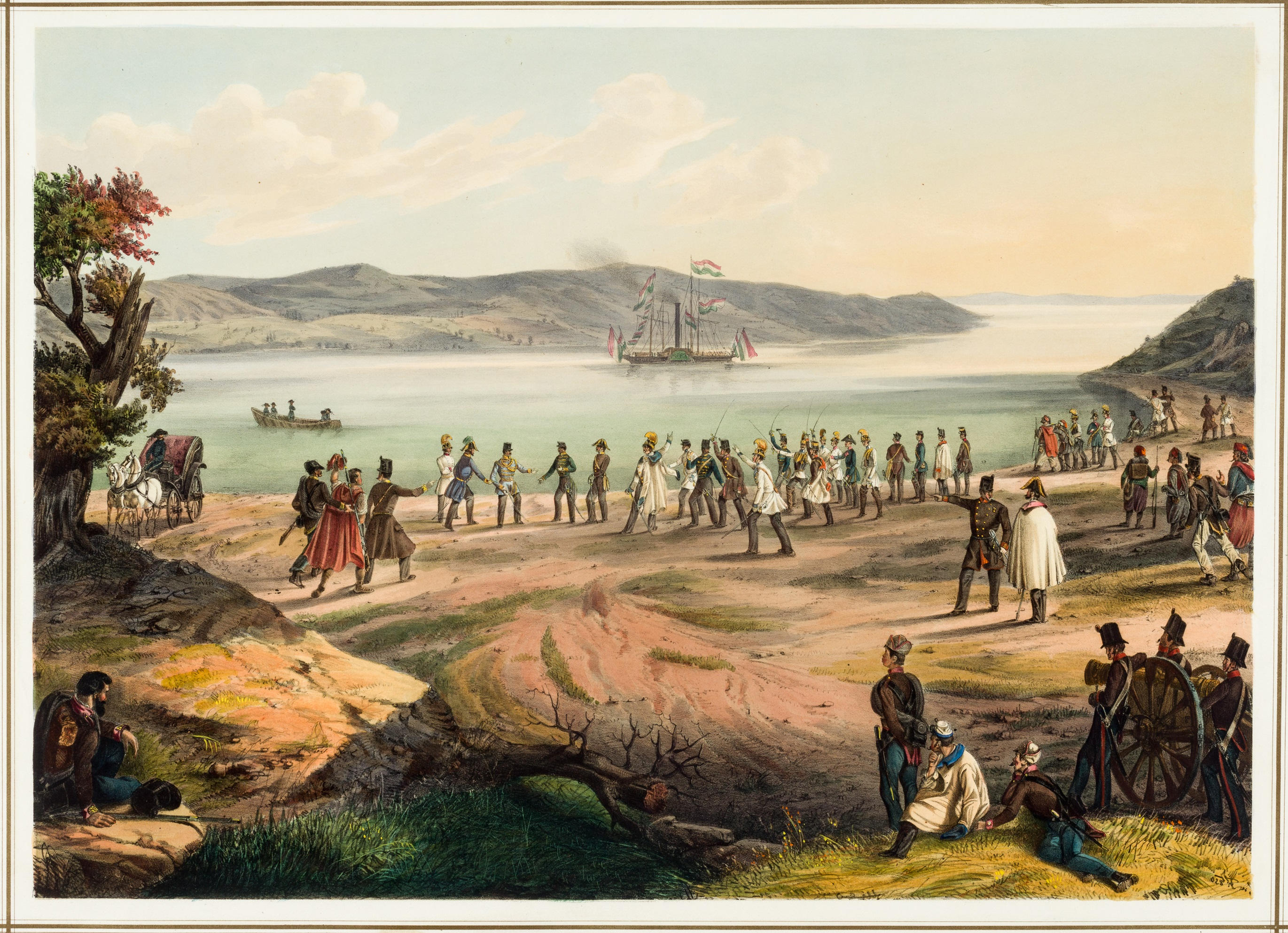
Archduke Stephen tries to negotiate with Josip Jelačić on a steamboat on the Lake Balaton to stop his campaign on 21. September 1848, but the Ban refuses by Franz Xaver Zalder

To ensure the loyalty of the officers of K.u.K. service, Batthyány convinced Palatine Stephen to assume command of the Hungarian army on 15 September. The Palatine tried to make contact with Jelačić, but the Ban refused to appear for the negotiations on 21 September, on board the Kisfaludy steamboat at Lake Balaton, the scene of the planned negotiations, thus publicly humiliating the only member of the Habsburg dynasty sympathetic to the Hungarian cause. Thereafter, Palatine Stephen fled Hungary to Vienna, resigning from his dignity.

On 25 September, Emperor Ferdinand I appointed Lieutenant-General Count Ferenc Lamberg as commander-in-chief of all the armed forces in Hungary – both Hungarian and Croatian. However, the appointed commander-in-chief traveled to the capital, where the National Assembly declared his mission illegal on Kossuth's motion, and on 28 September, the angry crowd attacked and lynched him on the pontoon bridge over the Danube.

==== Kossuth's recruiting tours ====
Simultaneously, the Hungarian politicians did everything to gather an army against the Croatian troops which were approaching the Hungarian capital.

In the autumn of 1848, for instance, Kossuth made two tours of the Great Hungarian Plain, and in his speeches, called on the people of its towns and villages to rise against the invaders, or join the Honvéd army as soon as possible. During his first recruitment trip, between 24 and 28 September, he visited Cegléd, Nagykőrös, Kecskemét, Abony and Szolnok. Between 29 September and 4 October, he spoke in Csongrád, Szentes, Hódmezővásárhely, Szegvár and Szeged. As a result of his inflammatory speeches, tens of thousands of national guards and popular insurrectionists rose and rushed to guard the left bank of the Danube and prevent a possible Croatian attempt to cross.

==== Desertions of the Hussar units from abroad, and their return to Hungary ====
The worsening military situation required the activation of all Hungarian weapon-bearing forces to defend the homeland.

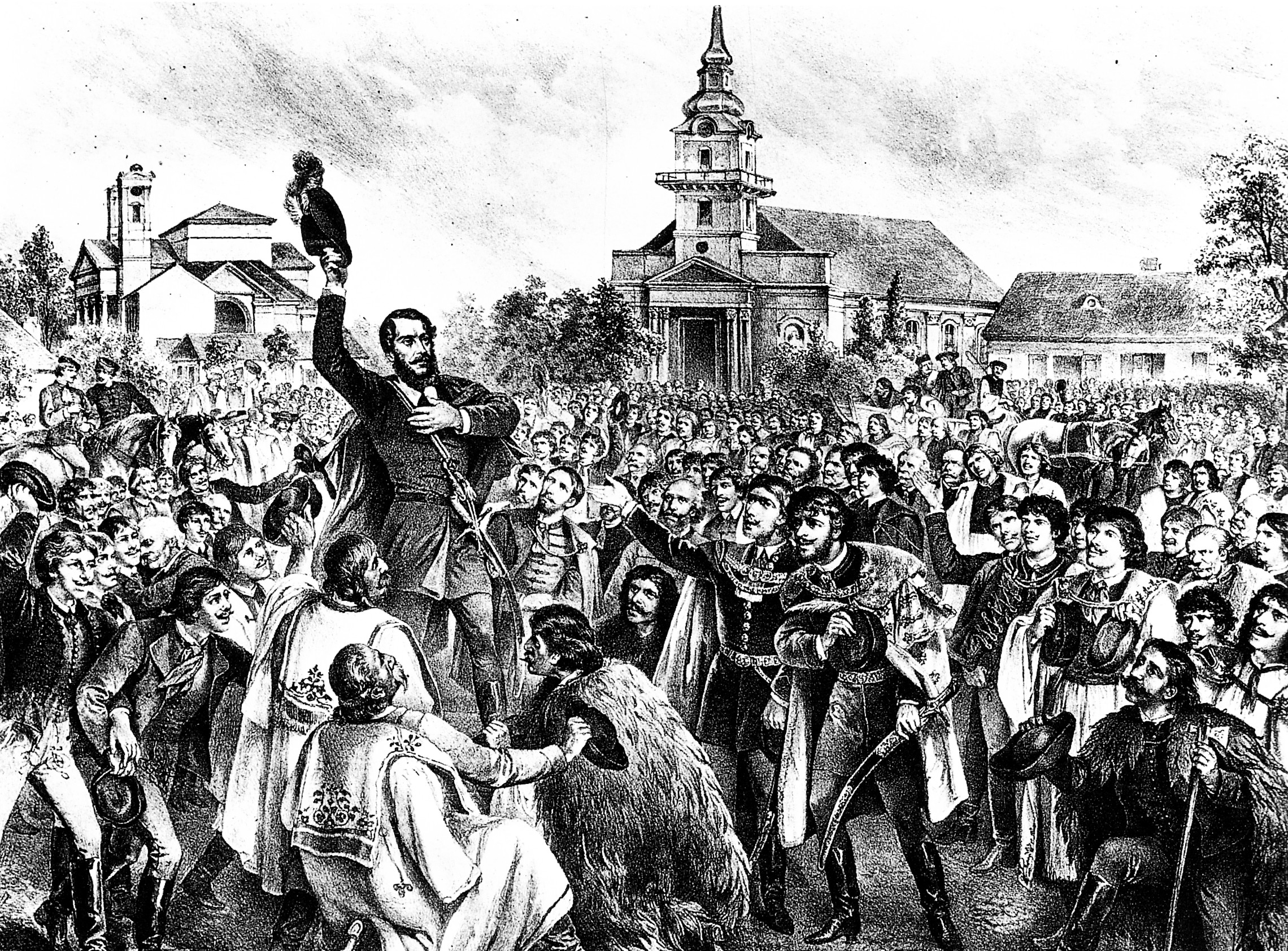
Kollarz Kossuth Cegléden 1848

This included also the Hussars, the majority of whom were stationed in the Austrian provinces outside of Hungary: Austria, Bohemia, Galicia, and Italy. At the beginning of 1848, only 4 Hussars regiments were stationed in Hungary: the 1st (Imperial), 2nd (Hannover), 3rd (Ferdinand of Este), and 11th (Székely) Hussars. From the beginning, the newly formed Batthyány government sought to bring home the Hussar regiments stationed in parts of the empire outside Hungary and to transfer in return the cavalry regiments of non-Hungarian composition, stationed there. Due to the negotiations, by the end of September 1848, the 6th (Württemberg) and the 9th (Nicholas) Hussar regiments had returned home while 6 companies of the 4th (Alexander) and 4 of the 10th (Wilhelm) Hussars were returned. On 10 October 1848, after the open break between Vienna and Pest, the Hungarian National Assembly, through open proclamations and secret letters sent to the troops, called home the Hungarian soldiers stationed abroad, whose escape it tried to help by sending agents. By the end of 1848, the 6 companies of the 4th and 10th Hussars, still abroad, had escaped, albeit with losses, and under adventurous circumstances had returned home, as had virtually the entire 8th (Coburg) Hussars from Galicia. Of the 12th (Palatine) Hussar Regiment in Bohemia, only the 2nd Major Squadron managed to return to Hungary in adventurous escapes during October.

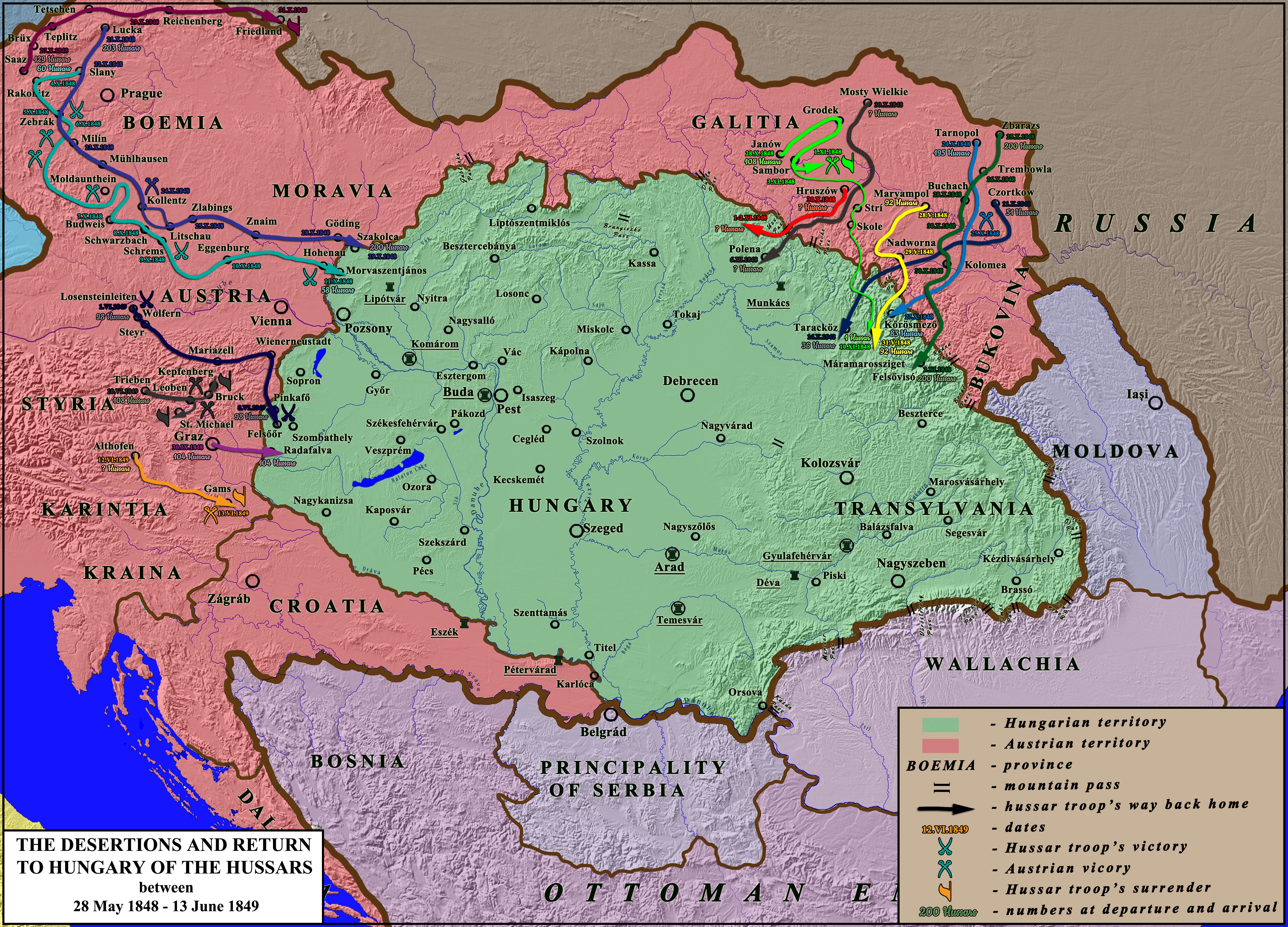
The Desertions and Return to Hungary of the Hussar Troops during the Hungarian war of Independence of 1848–1849

The Hussars that escaped from Galicia, Bohemia, and Austria, in groups numbering from 25 to 300 men, cut their way through mountains, rivers, and other natural obstacles, avoiding, breaking through, and overcoming the imperial troops that were blocking their way, chased or attacked them, finally reaching often miraculously the Hungarian border.

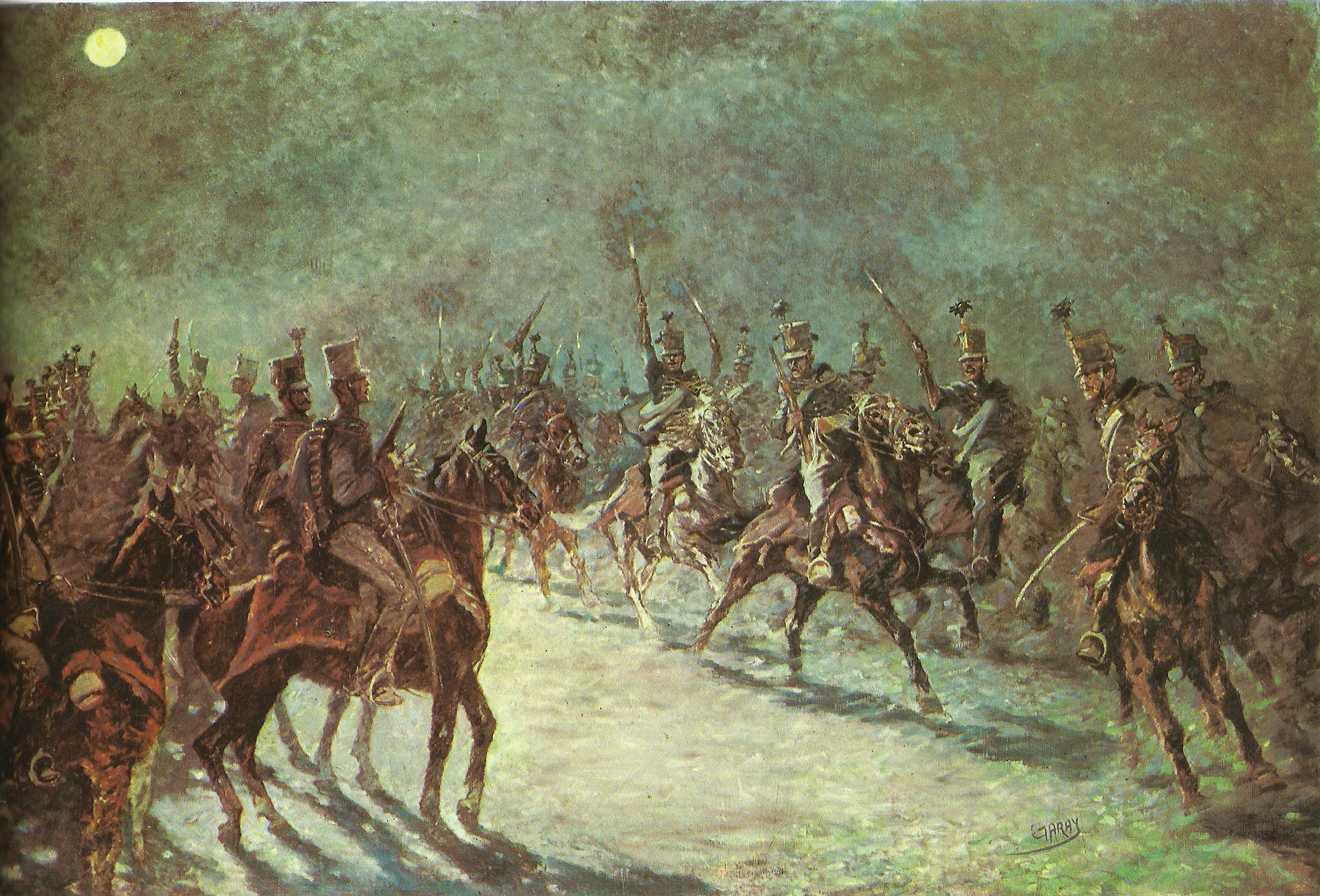
Desertion of the Nádor Hussars in October 1848 (Ákos Garay)

The most adventurous, and also the most famous Hussar escapes to Hungary, were the 91 Württemberg hussars from Marijampolė, Galicia, led by Captain János Lenkey between 25 and 31 May, the 60 Palatine hussars led by Captain Lajos Sréter from Slaný in Bohemia between 4–11 October, and the 203 Hussars led by Lieutenant Gedeon Virágh, from Raudnitz in Bohemia between 21 and 29 October. These Hussars, who managed to reach Hungary, immediately joined the Hungarian army, and went on the battlefield to fight the invading K.u.K. forces.

The Hussar desertions from the Austrian provinces, and their attempts to return to Hungary, did not end in 1848, they continued also in 1849. When the 12th Regiment was ordered to ride to Italy in the summer of 1849, nearly 100 members of the 1st Major Squadron also escaped. Later, the rest of the squadron also tried to escape, but they were captured and 13 of them were executed as a deterrent between 23 June and 6 July 1849. The 5th (Radetzky) and the 7th (Reuss-Köstritz) Hussar regiments were serving in Northern Italy, in the Imperial Army fighting against the Kingdom of Sardinia and the revolutionaries; there was no realistic chance of their transfer and subsequent escape across the Alps mountain range.

On the service records of those Hussars who after the defeat of the Hungarian War of Independence became prisoners, it was mentioned that they deserted from the imperial army, its cause being given as follows: The suspected reason for the escape: love of the fatherland.

==== Battle of Pákozd ====
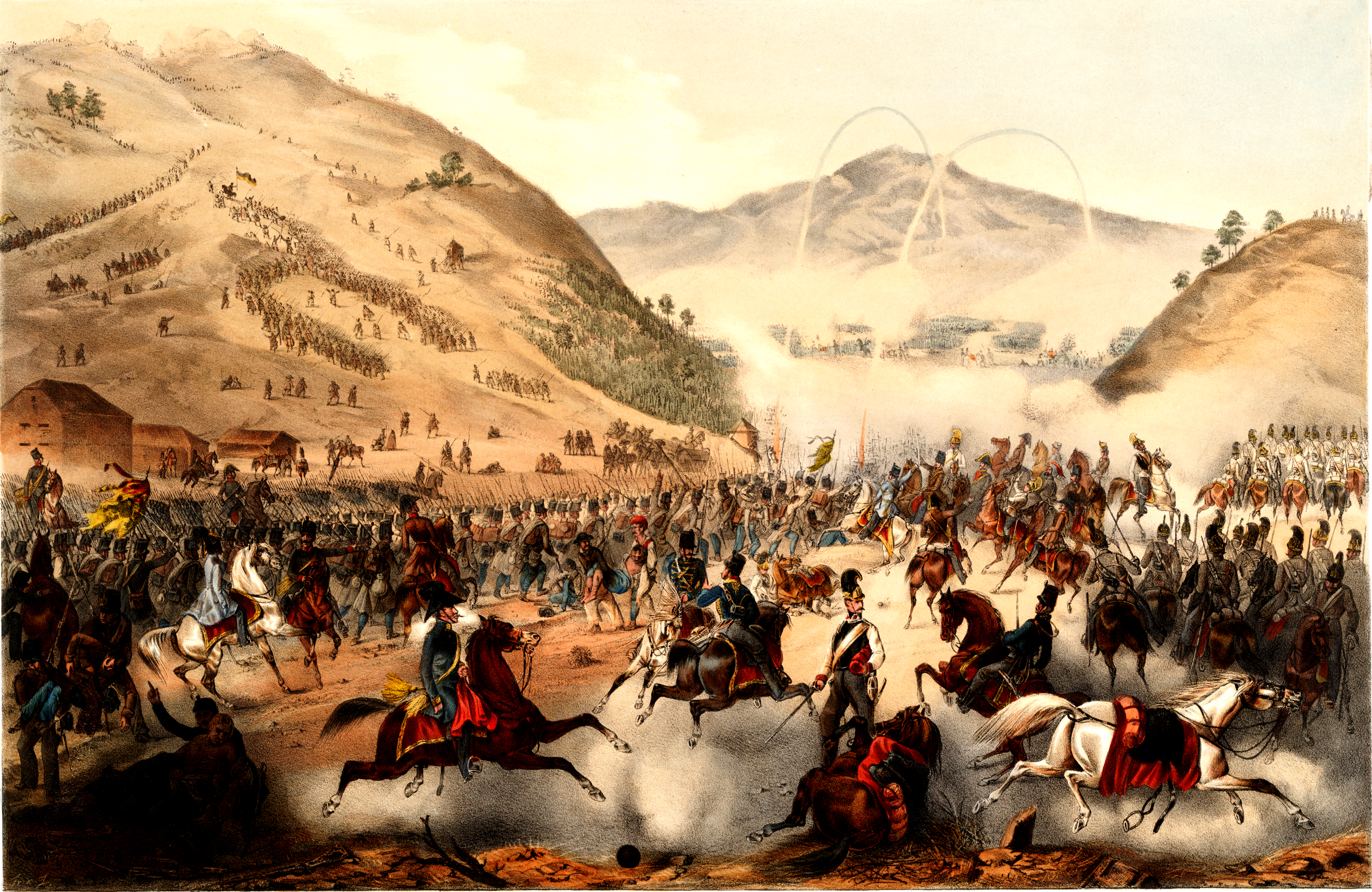
Battle of Pákozd

At the end of September, the Hungarian army, numbering nearly 18 000, was gathering in Transdanubia, at the northern shore of Lake Velence. On 29 September, the Hungarian army, deployed on the hills of Pátka and Sukoró, faced the attack of the twice outnumbering Croatian troops of Jelačić. However, the Hungarian troops led by Lieutenant-General János Móga repulsed the Croatians' successive attacks in the Battle of Pákozd. One of Jelačić's divisions arrived only at the end of the battle, when he had already ordered his troops to retreat. On the next day the two parties signed a three-day ceasefire. The Ban of Croatia – mainly due to logistical problems – on 1 October retreated his troops, heading for Győr.

==== The surrender of a Croatian corps at Ozora ====
After the start of the Croatian invasion, Batthyány ordered a popular uprising in the whole of Transdanubia.

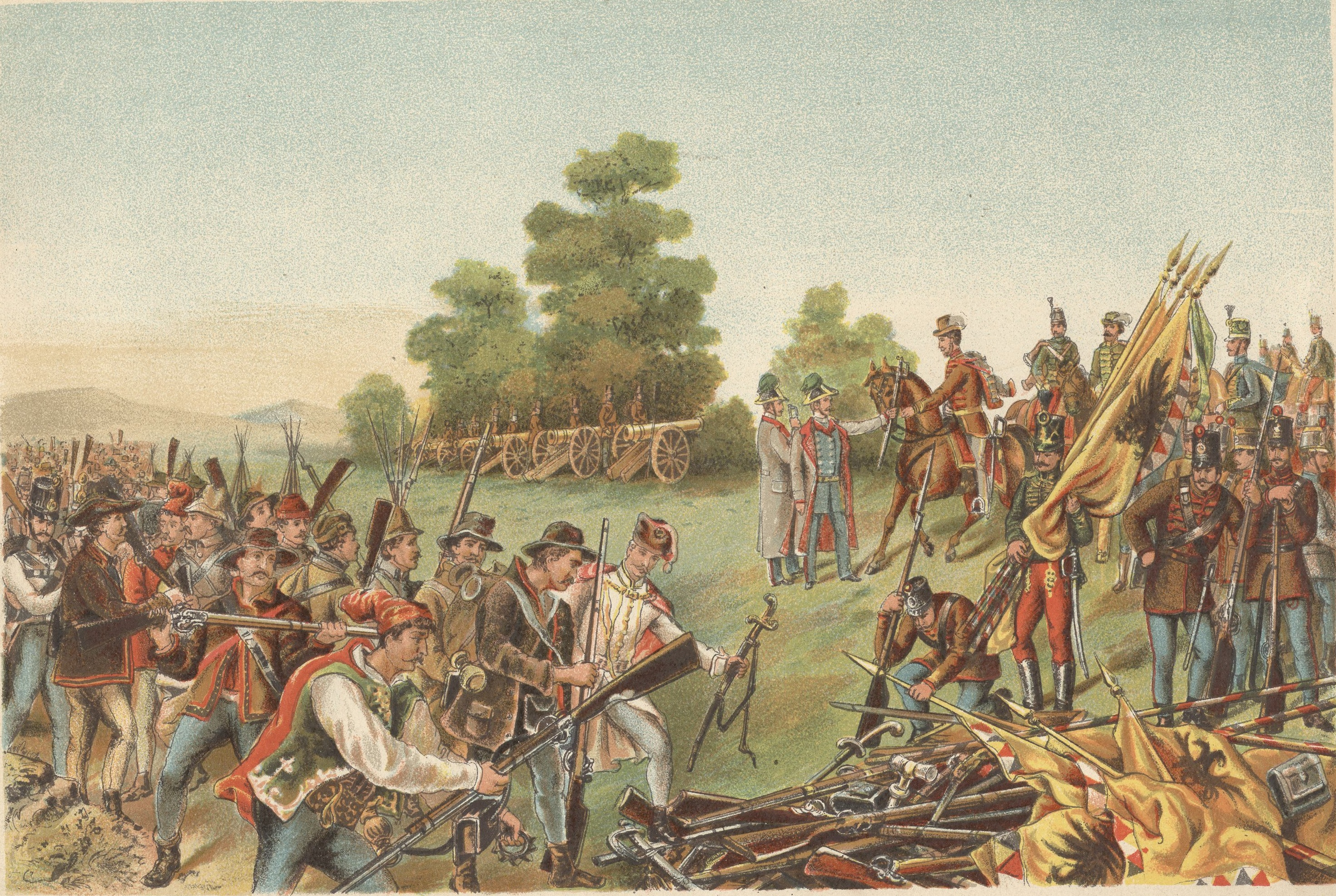
The Croatian troops surrender at Ozora at 7th October 1848

The main role of the popular uprising was to block the enemy's supply routes and communication. The people of Transdanubia listened to the call of the government, and started a generalized uprising and guerrilla war against the invaders, causing them more and more losses. At the end of September 1848, Hungarian militiamen intercepted Jelačić's messengers, which revealed that he was in direct contact with the Austrian Minister of War, Field Marshal Theodor Franz, Count Baillet von Latour, who sent him orders and advice. Thus this was another proof that Jelačić's campaign was not a Hungarian–Croatian conflict, but in fact a proxy war of the Habsburg Empire against Hungary.

The garrison left behind by Jelačić in Székesfehérvár was forced to surrender on 3 October by the urban popular uprising, and the 9,000-strong auxiliary column marching through the counties of Baranya and Tolna was forced to surrender at Ozora on 7 October by the National Guard, volunteers and militias led by colonels Artúr Görgei and Mór Perczel. It was the only victory of the War of Independence that ended with the capture of the entire enemy force.

==== Expulsion of the Croatian troops from the country ====
Soon, the rest of Transdanubia was also liberated. At the end of September, the National Guard of the Western Transdanubian counties, concentrated in Vas County, under the leadership of József Vidos, set off against the Croatian troops occupying Zala County.

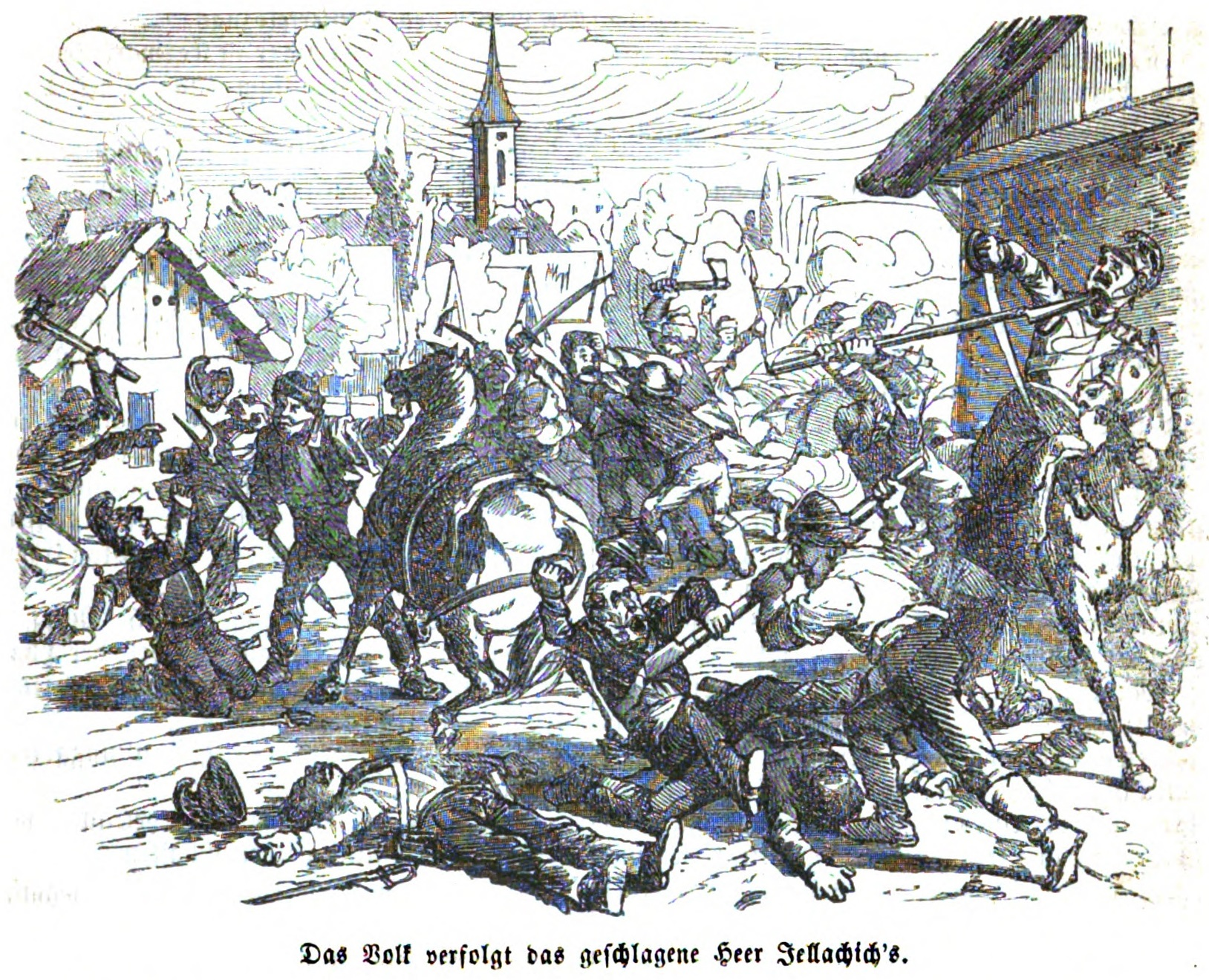
The Hungarian villagers attack the troops of Jelačić - German caricature

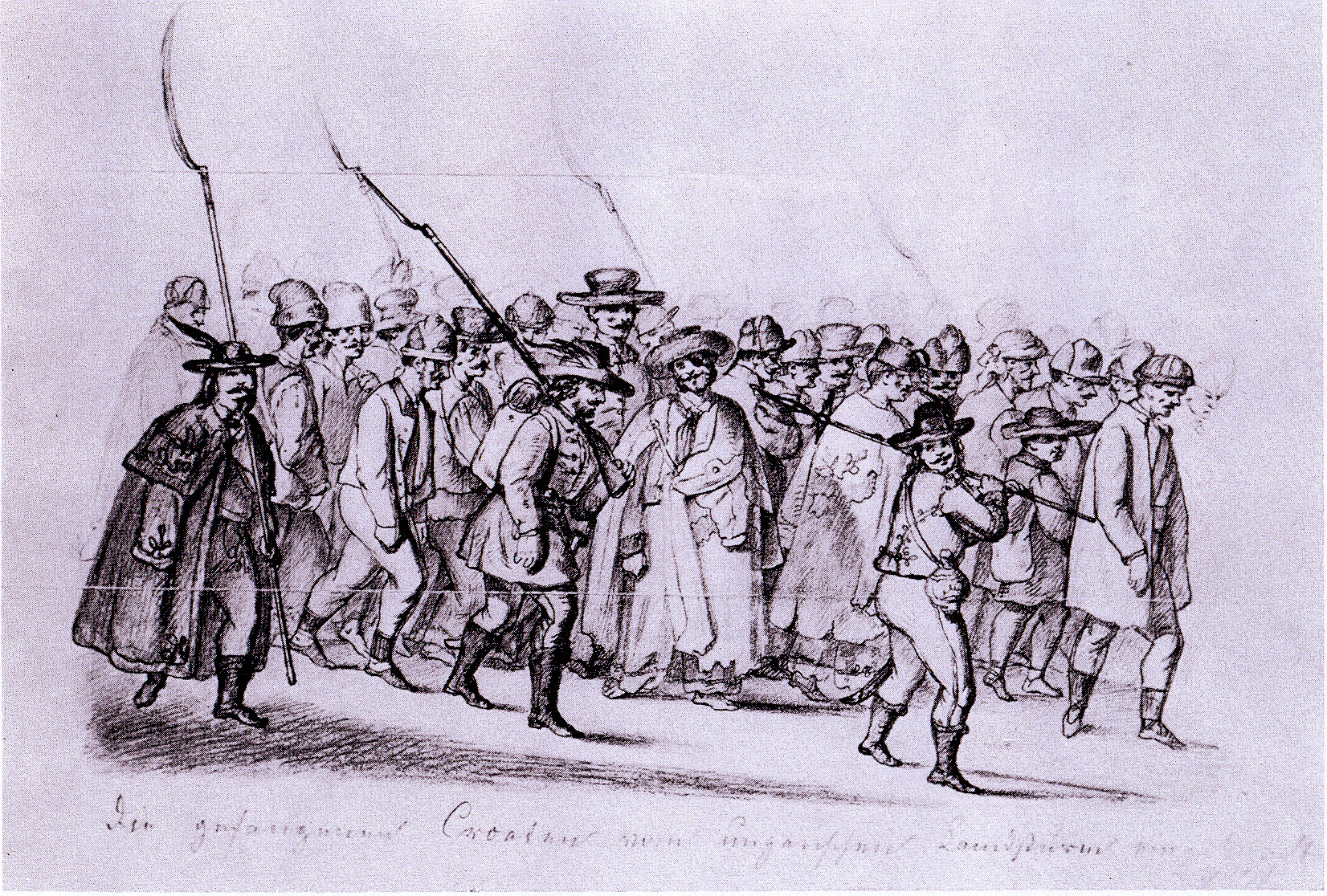
Escorting of the Croatian captives by Hungarian insurgents, after their surrender at Ozora - anonym drawing

On 3 October, the people of Nagykanizsa chased away the Croatian garrison there, and together with Vidos's troops drove the Croatian troops out of the whole Zala County.

In mid-October, Colonel Mór Perczel's division arrived in Zala County. On 17 October, he crossed the Mura River, and with his victories at Letenye and Kotor, by the next day he had driven the Croatian troops out of the Mura Interfluve (Muraköz/Međimurje). On 8 November, he beat the Styrian Imperial forces in the Battle of Friedau, and after this, he evacuated the Muraköz on 11 November. Then, he then held the Croatian and Styrian forces at bay until mid-December.

At the end of September, the legion organized by the Slovak National Council with Austrian money entered northern Hungary, but the Hungarian authorities from Upper Hungary (Felvidék) soon drove it out, with the forces of the local Slovak National Guards and the popular uprising. In December, the leaders of the Slovak National Council joined the K.u.K. army and attempted to get the Slovak population to rise against the Hungarians, but they were not very successful. The Slovak legion, composed mostly of Czech students from Prague, was only one battalion strong and numbered less than a thousand, while the Hungarian army had at least tens of thousands of Slovak soldiers.

=== Attempt to help the revolution in Vienna ===
When the news of Ferenc Lamberg's murder on 28 September in Pest had reached Vienna, in his manifesto of 3 October the emperor appointed Jelačić as the omnipotent commander of the Hungarian armed forces and the royal commissioner of the country. However Jelačić was unable to take this role, as his troops retreated towards the Austrian border, as a result of his defeat at Pákozd. On 4 October, the Ban of Croatia received the manifesto of 3 October at Magyaróvár, and as a consequence, he planned a new attack on Hungary, but first, he waited for reinforcements to arrive from Upper Hungary and the Transdanubian region.

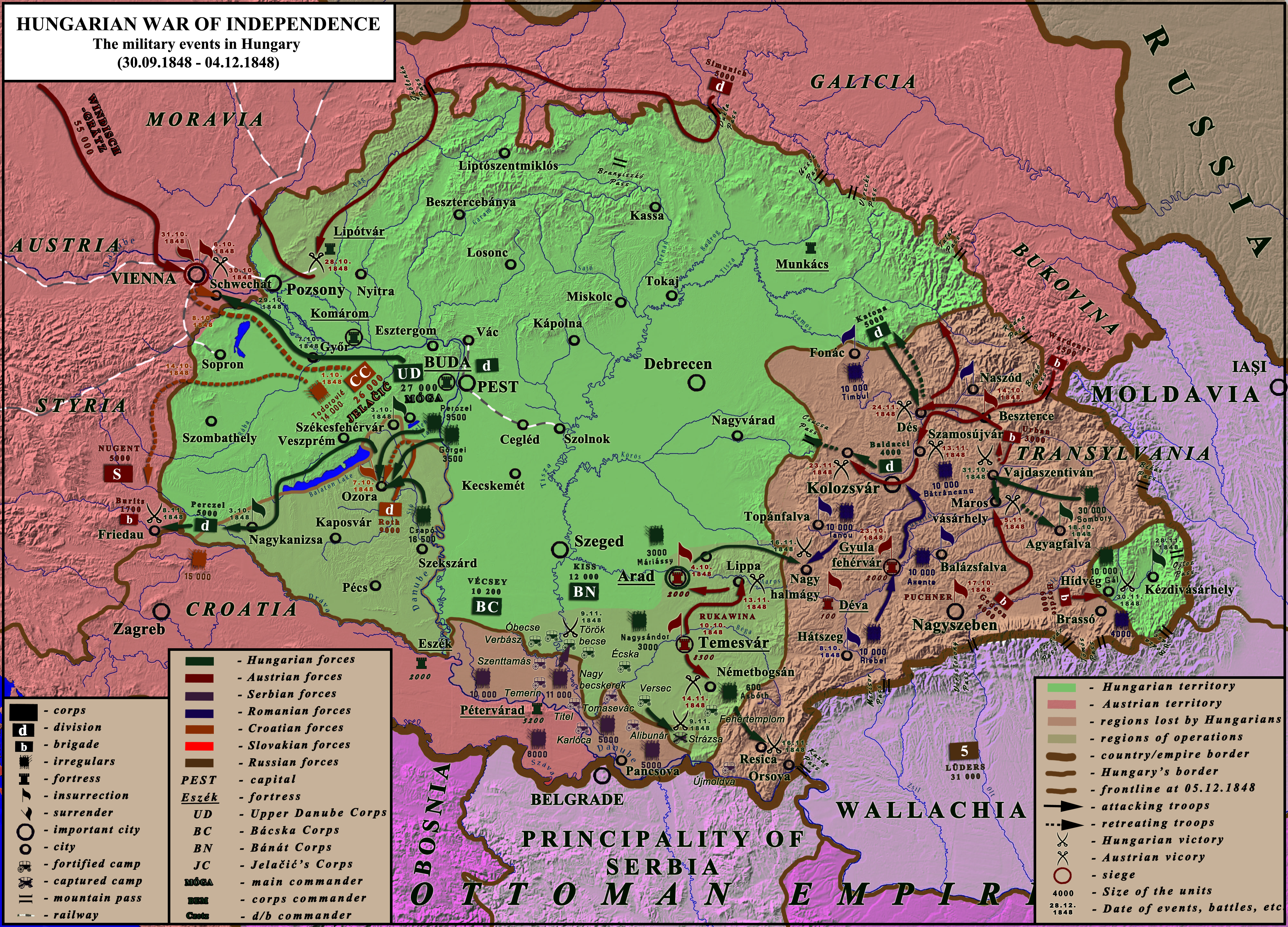
The Military Situation in Hungary between 30.09.1848 and 04.12.1848

On 6 October, however, another revolution broke out in Vienna, in which Jelačić's main supporter, the Imperial Minister of War Theodor Franz Baillet von Latour was lynched by the outraged mob. Jelačić was thus left without support, thus he sent the less valuable part of his army (the militias and national guards) to Croatia, and with the rest he retreated towards Austria. All these contributed to the fact that the majority of the former officers of the Imperial Army (many of them not of Hungarian ethnicity) did not abandon the Hungarian side. The Vienna Revolution came at the right time for the Hungarian cause, as it made impossible any imperial attacks on Hungary for weeks.

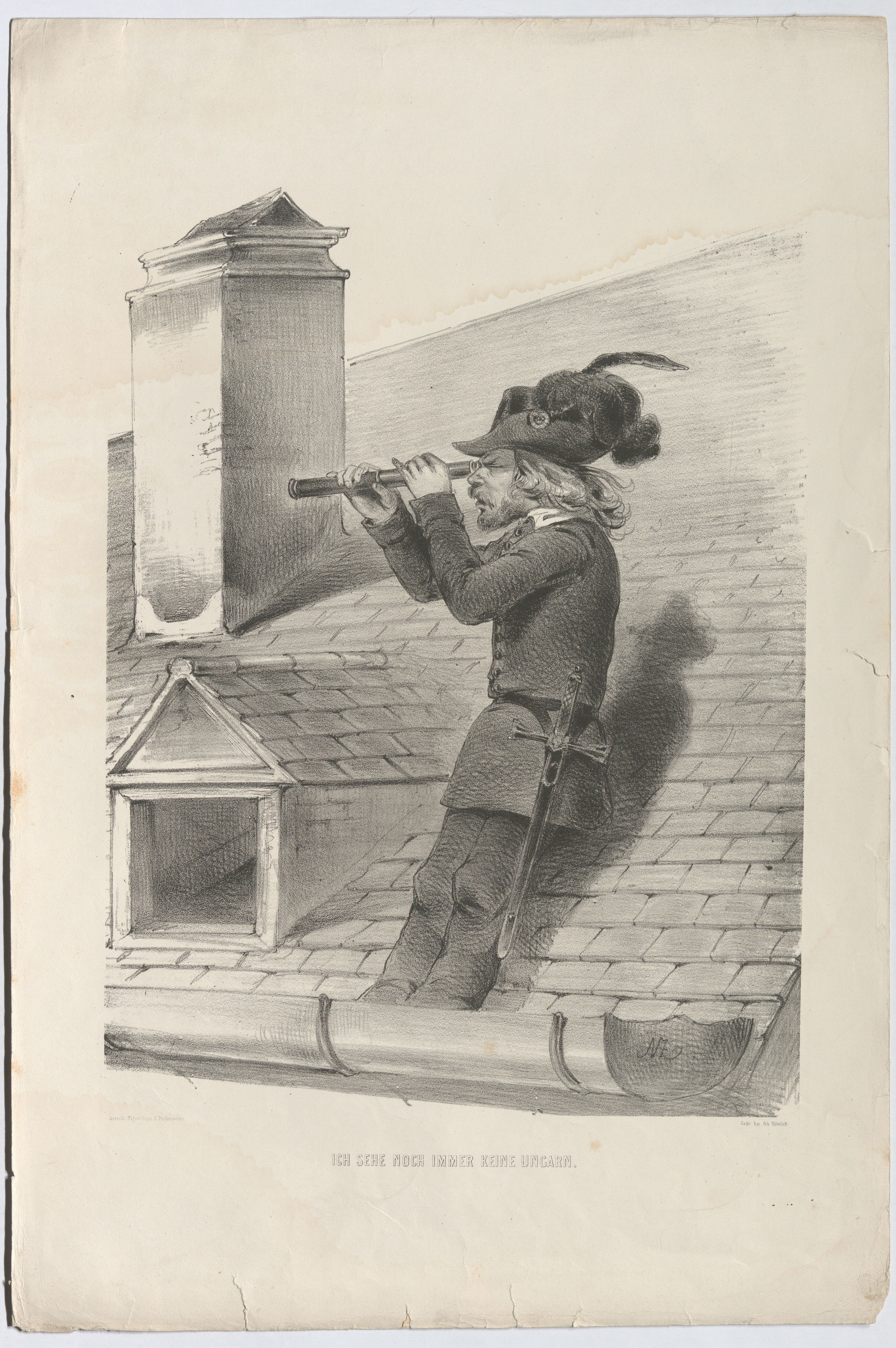
"Ich sehe noch keine Ungarn" - Viennese revolutionary waiting for the Hungarian troops to arrive in October 1848, to relieve city from the siege of the imperial troops..

At the same time, the Hungarian commander Lieutenant General János Móga with his troops pursued Jelačić. However, as the Croatian forces were still superior, the pursuit was rather cautious. A fundamental turning point came with the arrival of the news about the Viennese Revolution. The Hungarian army then advanced to the Leitha (Lajta) – the border river between Hungary and Austria – where it awaited a political decision on what to do next. After the Vienna Revolution, it seemed natural that the Hungarian army would rush to the aid of Vienna, threatened by the K.u.K. troops. However, there were serious military and political arguments against crossing the border. Jelačić's army was significantly reinforced in early October. For the Hungarians, crossing the border meant the risk that the army would have to face not only Croatian troops but also those of the K.u.K. army, which had been pushed out of Vienna by the revolution. This, besides the enemy's superior strength, would have caused a serious moral conflict both to the Hungarian army's conscripts sworn to the common monarch and the officers coming from the K.u.K. army.

On 10 October, the Hungarian Parliament decided that if Vienna called for help, the Hungarian army must go to its aid. In Vienna, however, neither the Imperial Assembly, nor its commission, nor even the city council were not inclined to formally ask for Hungarian assistance. Several of them still hoped that some way could be found to reach a compromise with the imperial court. In addition, the leaders of the Hungarian army refused to cross the Austrian border until Vienna sent them an invitation.

Meanwhile, the forces of the counter-revolution were not idle. Emperor Ferdinand who fled from Vienna to Olmütz, on 16 October made Prince Alfred Windisch-Grätz, who became famous in June 1848 by crushing the Prague Uprising of 1848, the main commander of all the imperial forces outside Italy. On 23 October, Windisch-Grätz arrived with his troops in front of Vienna, by using the railway. Now, with nearly 80 000 imperial troops concentrated under Vienna, the Hungarian army had no chance of effective intervention and victory.

At the end of October, Kossuth himself arrived in the Hungarian camp and tried to convince the army to make one last attempt to march to relieve Vienna. On 27 October, after serious debates, the Hungarian Council of War accepted Kossuth's proposal. In the meantime, the delegation of the Vienna City Council accepted Windisch-Grätz's terms for the surrender of the city on 29 October, but when the defenders learned of the advance of the Hungarian troops, on 30 October they took up arms again. Windisch-Grätz was thus unable to use all his strength against the Hungarian army, thus he sent a part of his troops led by Jelačić to confront the enemy.

==== Battle of Schwechat ====
On 30 October, the advancing Hungarian troops clashed with Jelačić's Croatian and Austrian forces in the Battle of Schwechat on the line of the Schwechat River

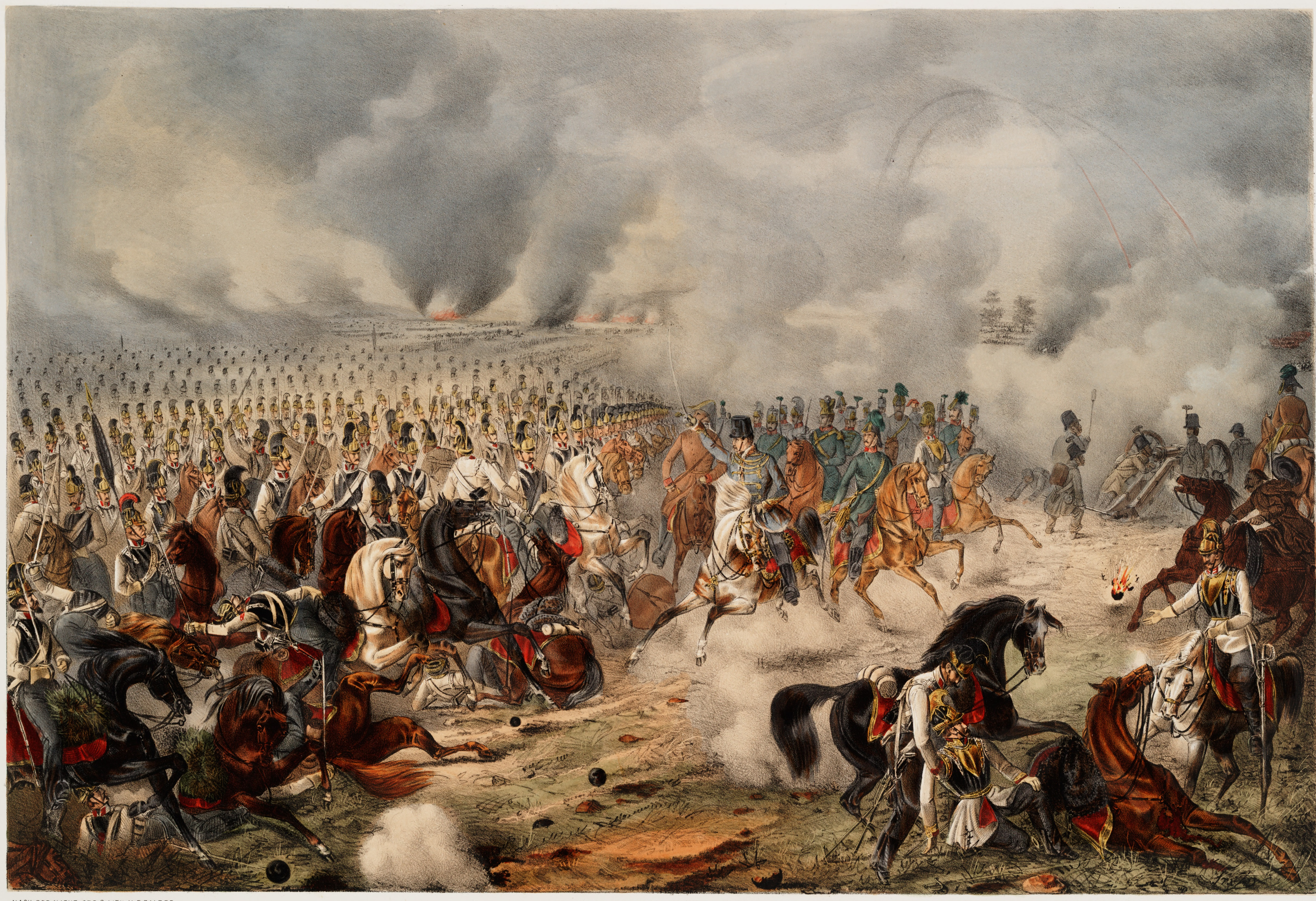
Battle of Schwechat by Franz Xaver Zalder

near Vienna,

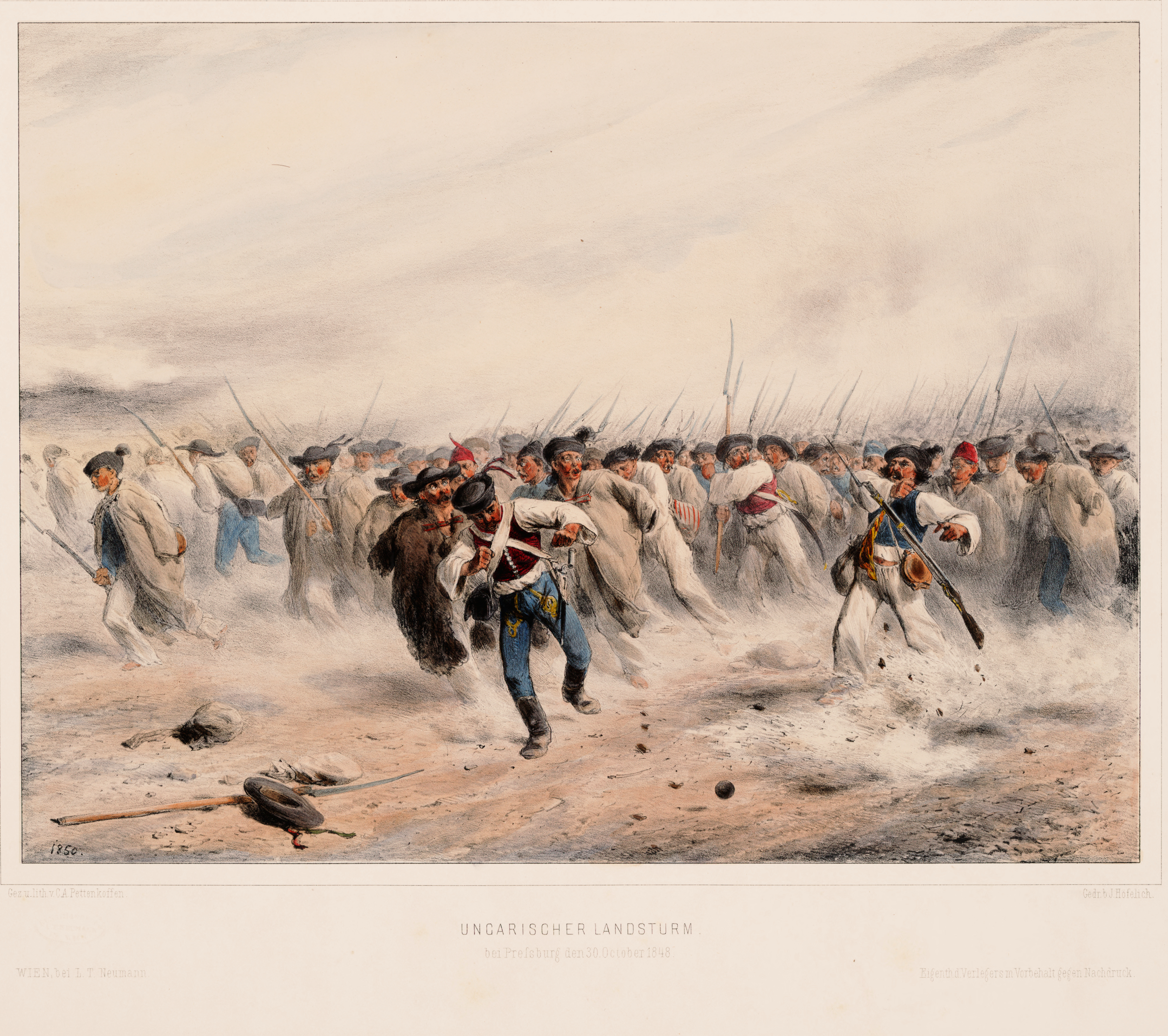
Hungarian national guards and militias running from the Battle of Schwechat on 30. October 1848

between the villages of Schwechat and Mannswörth. The Hungarian army consisted of about 27,000 men and 82 guns, while Jelačić had 30,000 soldiers and 99 guns. But the balance of power was only apparent. The majority of Jelačić's army was made up of battle-hardened troops, while half of the Hungarian troops were largely made up of recruits and national guardsmen with straightened scythes instead of rifles. The Hungarian attack, which started prosperously, got stuck in the enemy's heavy cannon fire and degenerated into a disorderly flight.

During the battle, Móga fell from his horse and resigned from the main commandment. After the battle, Kossuth entrusted the leadership of the army to the 30-year-old young man, Artúr Görgei, whom he also appointed general. Görgei, as seen above, played an important role in the victory of Ozora, and he was one of those who supported Kossuth's position on the border crossing.

On 31 October, the day after the Battle of Schwechat, Vienna also fell to the imperials. The crushing of the Vienna Revolution was followed by severe reprisals, with 25 people sentenced to death by court martial.

== The spread of counter-revolution in Hungary ==
The Imperial Manifesto of 3 October ordered the dissolution of the Hungarian Diet, declaring its previous resolutions and decrees illegal. It suspended the functioning of local governments and imposed a state of emergency in Hungary. In the Manifesto, the emperor ordered the imperial troops and their officers stationed in Hungary to renounce their allegiance to the Hungarian government and revolt against it, threatening those who failed to comply with severe punishment. The royal manuscript was formally illegal, as it was not countersigned by the Hungarian government. From a substantive point of view, it was invalid because Parliament had not yet finished debating the Budget Act, and according to Article 4 of Act 1848:4, the Parliament could not be dissolved before the conclusion of the debates and the adoption of the final accounts of the previous year.

=== The defection of castles and fortresses ===
As a result of the aforementioned imperial manifesto, the Main Army Commandments (General Commandos) of Transylvania and Banat revolted against the Hungarian parliament and government.

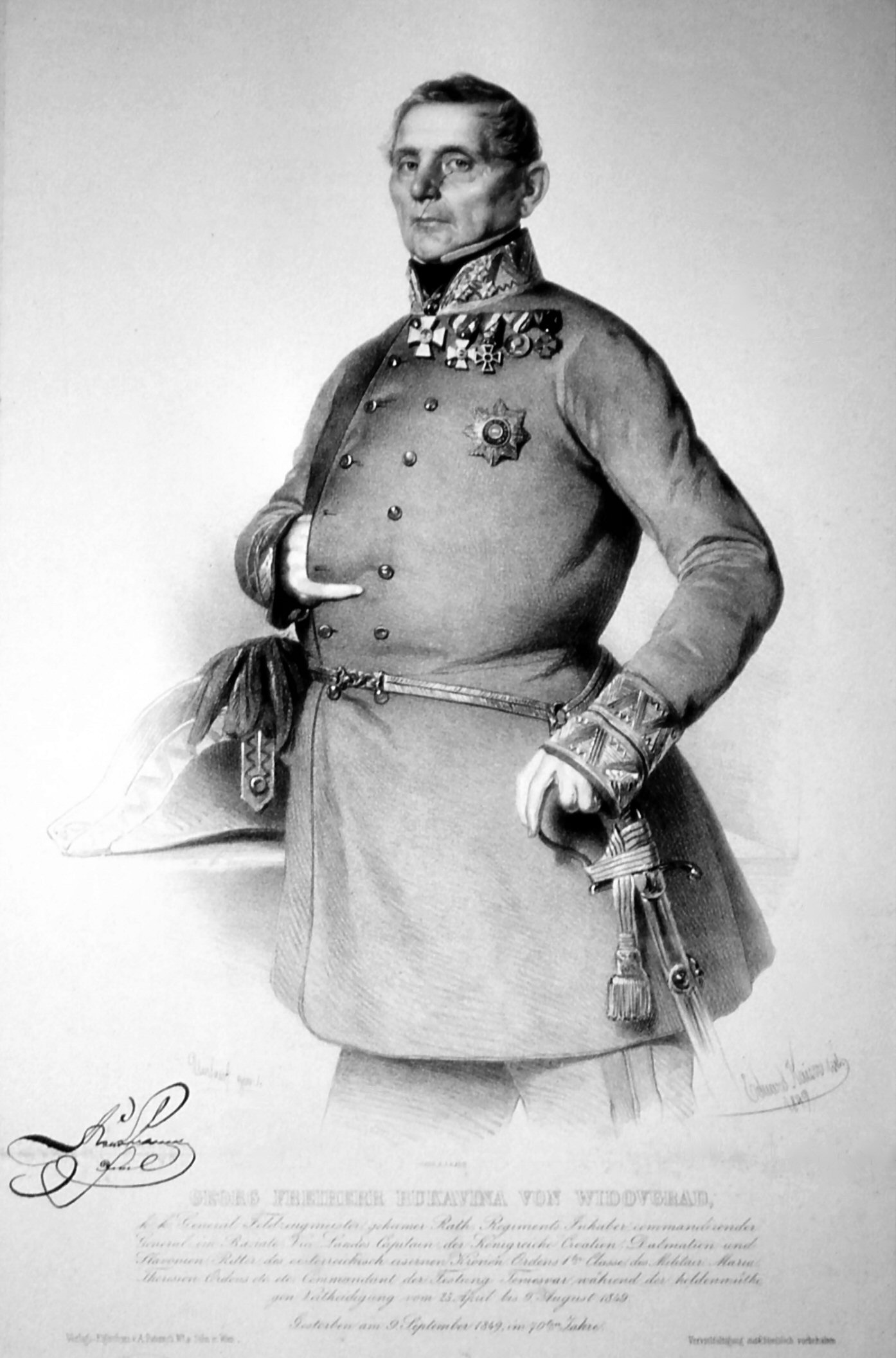
Georg Rukavina, commander of the Temesvár Fortress, who in October 1848 joined the anti-Hungarian rebellion of the K.u.K. troops stationing in Hungary

As a result of this, several castles and fortresses, most of whose commanders and soldiers were foreigners declared that they would not obey the Hungarian government, but only to the emperor. In October 1848, the garrisons of the two fortresses of the Banat General Commando, Temesvár, and Arad rebelled, and the same was done in Transylvania by the garrison of Gyulafehérvár and Déva. However, at the end of September 1848, the Hungarians managed to secure the most powerful fortress in Hungary, Komárom, and Pétervárad declared its loyalty on 15 October too. At the same time, smaller fortresses such as Lipótvár in the western part of Upper Hungary, Eszék (Osijek) in Slavonia and Munkács in northeastern Hungary also came under Hungarian control. In summary, all important fortifications west of the river Tisza were under Hungarian control, while pro-imperial commanders administered those east of it.

=== Fight against the Serbs and the imperial fortresses in southern Hungary ===
After the rebellion of the fortresses (Arad and Temesvár), the situation was aggravated even more by the fact that the Serbian uprising was still in progress. Now the Serbian and the Austrian forces numbered 36,000–40,000 men and 140–160 cannons, while the Hungarians could oppose them with 26,000–28,000 soldiers and 106 cannons.

However, the Hungarian forces stationed in the area soon proved to be an equal opponent. On 13 October, the Serbian troops from Bácska, which were attacking Törökbecse, were repulsed in the Battle of Törökbecse-Óbecse-Nagykikinda.

In the last two months of the year, in the region of Bácska, no important battles were held, and even peace attempts were made at the end of November, but these were unsuccessful.

=== The loss of Transylvania ===
The second Romanian national assembly in Balázsfalva, which met from 16 to 28 September, demanded the adoption of the Austrian constitution in Transylvania, which in essence proclaimed the equal rights of nationalities and the abolition of the Hungarian constitution (although, as seen above, the bill of the Union Committee of the Hungarian Parliament promised the same thing), and decided to arm and mobilize the Romanian population.

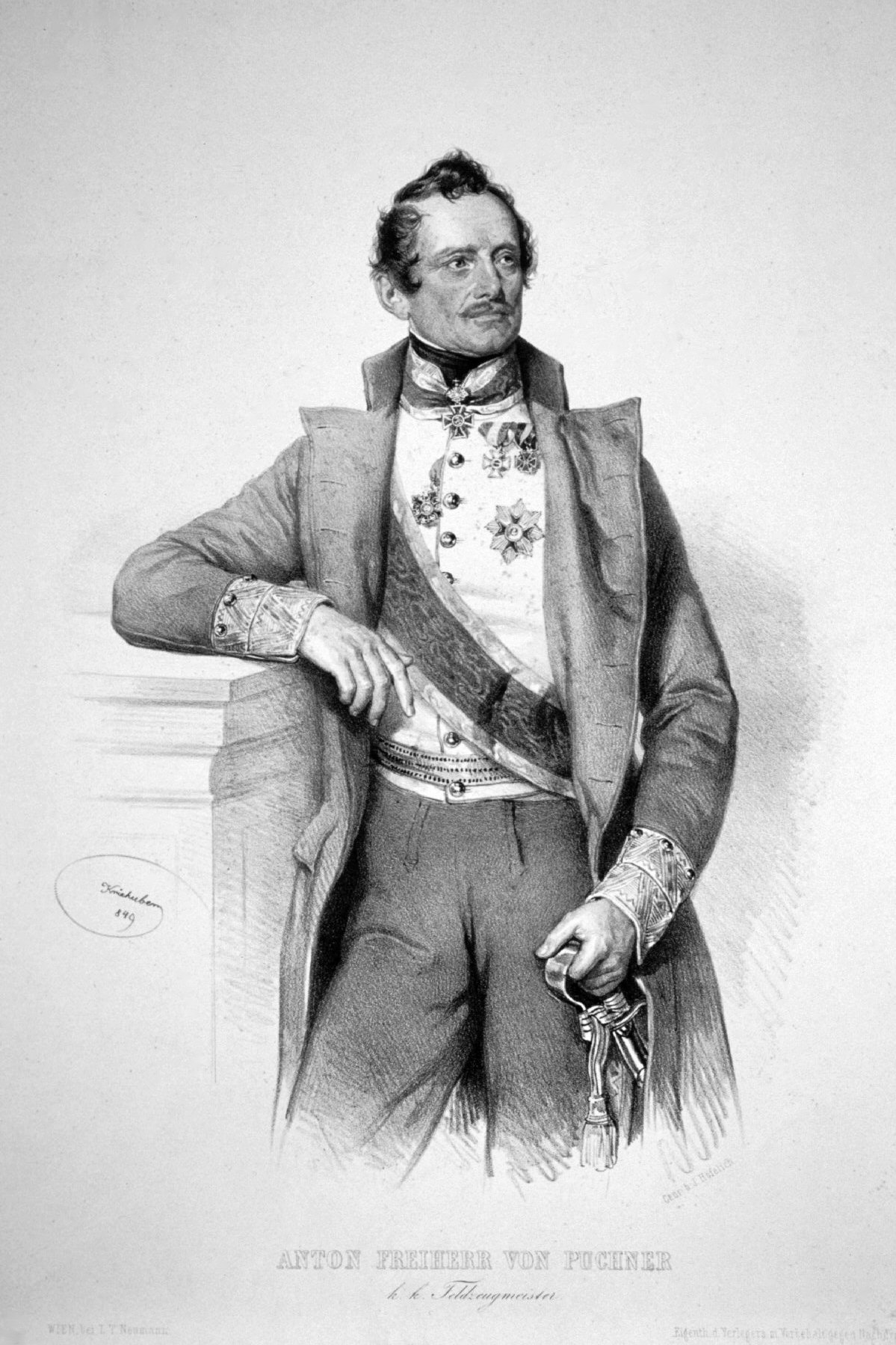
Anton Freiherr von Puchner

At the end of the month, the armed rebellion of the Romanian peasantry and border guard regiments began against the Hungarian government. To prevent the Hungarians from resisting this rebellion, the rebels, supported by the Transylvanian General Commando, began to break into cities and villages and disarm the Hungarians. The rebels, however, were not content with disarming the Hungarians but launched an ethnic cleansing against them. Thousands of unarmed Hungarian civilians were killed in these massacres (the worst massacres were in Zalatna, Gerendkeresztúr, Kisenyed, Magyarigen, Felvinc). As a response, the Hungarians too committed some atrocities against the Romanians and Saxons, like those made by Székelys at Szászrégen.

All of this was done with the knowledge and permission of the head of the Transylvanian (Main Army Headquarters) General Commando, General Anton Puchner, who knew, that the more serious and bloody the ethnic civil war between the Romanians and Hungarians was, the less possible was to conclude any agreement and cooperation between these two nations. Puchner made Southern Transylvania, the region inhabited by the Transylvanian Saxons, who were the ethnic group most loyal to him, the base of his counter-revolutionary campaign against the Hungarian authorities. In early October, Puchner concentrated his forces around the Saxon towns (Nagyszeben, Brassó, Segesvár, Szászsebes, etc.). In his attack against the Hungarian government, Puchner could count on 13 000 Austrian line regiments stationed in Transylvania, and the Romanian rebels, who, according to some accounts were 150,000 men. On 18 October, Puchner openly declared his revolt by issuing a statement calling the Hungarian government illegitimate, refusing to obey it and inciting the Romanians and Saxons to revolt.

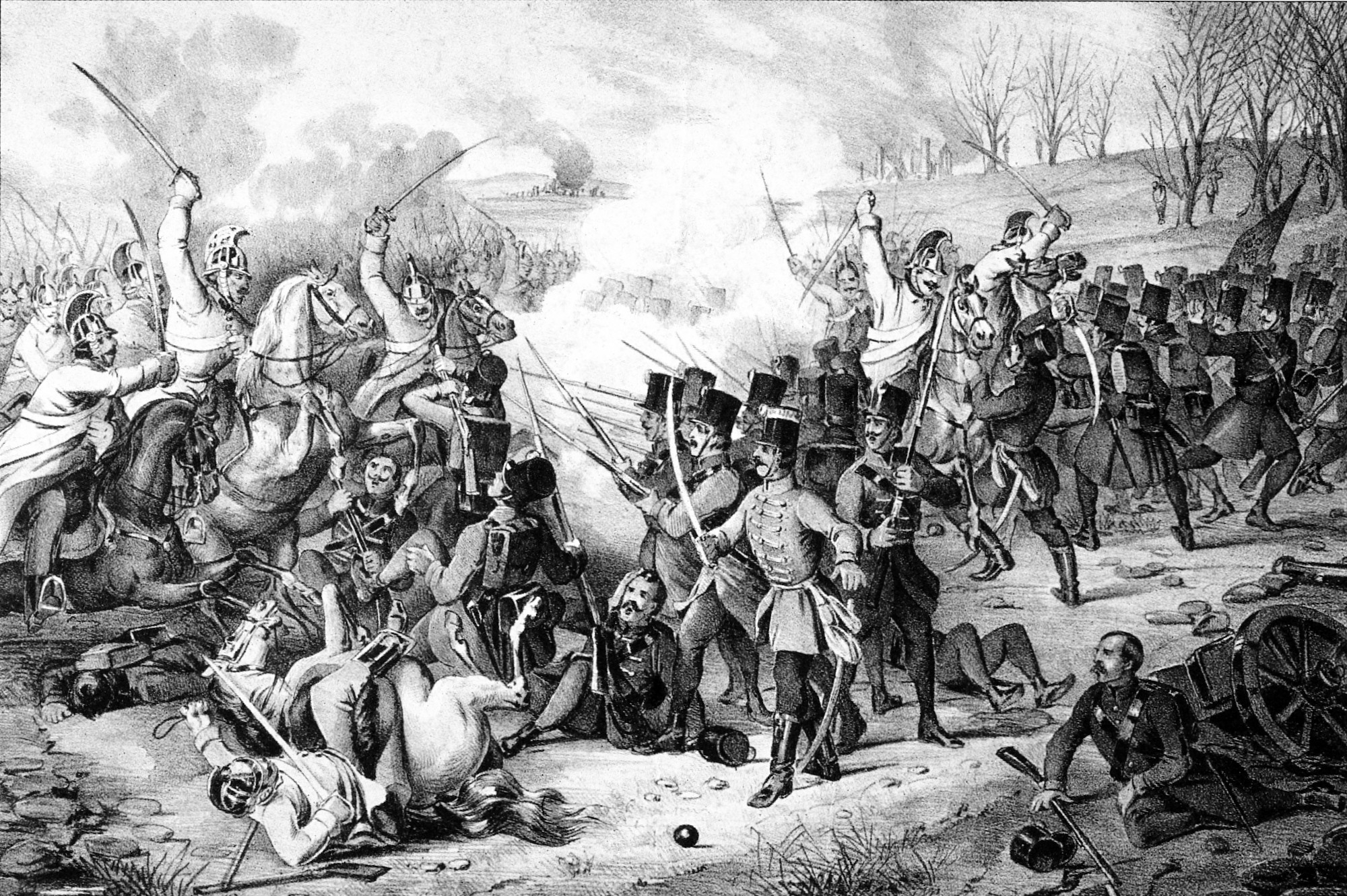
First Battle of Dés 25 November 1848 (Armee Bulletin VII)

On 16–18 October, the Székely community held a national meeting in Agyagfalva, and they too decided to start an uprising, but they did not take a stand against Hungary but against the Austrian General Commando and the Saxon, and Romanian rebellion, in favor of the union between Transylvania and Hungary, and to defend the Hungarian civilian population attacked by the Romanian rebels. However, their troops were not sufficiently military organized, and they had no cannons. After defeating Lieutenant-Colonel Urban's Romanian troops at Vajdaszentiván on 31 October, the Székelys suffered a heavy defeat at Marosvásárhely on 5 November at the hands of Austrian troops equipped with cannons, sent by Puchner in support of Urban. Before the battle, at least half of the Székely troops had already returned home, but after the battle, all Székely resistance ended. Only Manó Baldacci's Hungarian troops of 3,000–4,000 soldiers and 6 cannons remained in the vicinity of Kolozsvár. But the Austrian troops attacked them from three directions, and the Hungarians were defeated, abandoning Kolozsvár and retreating to the border of Transylvania at Csucsa, where Major János Czetz tried to reorganize the troops who had lost their organization and hope. To aid the Hungarian troops in Transylvania, a Hungarian force of 5,000 led by Major Miklós Katona was sent from the Szatmár region in northern Transylvania, but was defeated at Dés on 25 November by Lieutenant-Colonel Urban, wresting Máramaros County from Hungarian hands. As a result of this battle, excepting the Székelys living in the Háromszék Seat, the whole of Transylvania came under full Austrian control.

== Results and evaluation of the Autumn Campaign ==
Despite serious shortcomings, the Hungarian army performed remarkably well in the autumn campaign of 1848. Much of the credit goes to Prime Minister Lajos Batthyány and the military administration he established. While the numerical superiority of the enemy was not completely overcome, by late September the opposing forces were roughly equal, which favored the defending Hungarians. Jelačić's lack of military skill also played a role in the Hungarian success, though it was not the sole factor. His strategy, based on psychological intimidation, failed by mid-September, after which momentum shifted to the Hungarian side.

Although the victory at Pákozd was significant, it should not be overestimated. The Hungarian army still showed weaknesses, and the Croatians maintained numerical superiority. Móga's cautious pursuit of the retreating enemy reflected that the troops of Jelačić twice the number of soldiers. While there was little evidence of a grand strategic plan, Hungarian forces coordinated well and utilized internal lines of movement effectively. Key successes included cutting communication between Jelačić's army and Croatia, liberating Nagykanizsa, and thwarting further Croatian advances in Zala county.

Following the defeat at Schwechat, the Hungarian army responded swiftly to Simunich's incursion. Securing Komárom, Lipótvár, and Eszék was crucial for future operations and preventing collapse during the winter. However, tactically, the results were mixed: alongside major victories at Székesfehérvár and Ozora, there were setbacks at Nagykanizsa, Salamonfa, and Jablonica. Many Hungarian units were irregular, outnumbered, or exhausted from long marches, which impacted their performance.

Still, the Hungarian side fared better than their Croatian and Imperial counterparts. Despite superior numbers, Jelačić failed to destroy the Hungarian main army, losing around 20% of his invasion force. Croatian detachments were unable to impose their will: Nugent had to abandon Kanizsa hastily, Roth couldn't retreat on time, and Todorović was forced to take a longer route back to Croatia. Meanwhile, key positions like Komárom and Eszék remained in Hungarian hands. Even Windisch-Grätz's attempt to draw Hungarian forces apart through Simunich's incursion failed.

== Sources ==
- Babucs, Zoltán (2023), ""Ide, magyar. Itt a zászlód, itt dögölj meg!" A schwechati csata, 1848. október 30 ("Come here, Hungarian. Here's your flag, here's where you'll die!" The Battle of Schwechat, October 30, 1848)", Magyarságkutató Intézet (2023-10-30) (in Hungarian)
- Babucs, Zoltán (2017), "Nyergelj, fordulj! (Saddle up, turn around!)", Magyar Hírlap (2017-03-14)
- Bánlaky, József (2001). A magyar nemzet hadtörténelme ("The Military History of the Hungarian Nation). Arcanum Adatbázis Kft.
- Bona, Gábor; Csikány, Tamás; Dobszay, Tamás (1996). 1848-1849 A szabadságharc és forradalom története ("1848-1849 The History of the War of Independence and the Revolution") (in Hungarian). Budapest: Videópont. ISBN 963-8218-207.
- Bona, Gábor (1999). The Hungarian Revolution and War of Independence, 1848-1849. A Military History. New York: Columbia University Press. p. 606. ISBN 0-88033-433-9.
- Cser, József (2009). Nagykanizsa a szabadságharc alatt (Nagykanizsa During the War of Independence) (PDF) (in Hungarian). Budapest: Czupi Kiadó.
- Egyed, Ákos (2010). Erdély 1848–1849 ("Transylvania in 1848-1849") (in Hungarian). Csíkszereda: Pallas-Akadémia Könyvkiadó. p. 616. ISBN 978-973-665-312-4.
- Hermann, Róbert (2001). 1848-1849. A szabadságharc hadtörténete ("1848–1849. The History of the War of Independence) (in Hungarian). Budapest: Korona Kiadó. p. 424. ISBN 9639376213.
- Hermann, Róbert (2014), "A pákozdi csata. 1848 szeptember 29 (Battle of Pákozd. 29 September 1848)" (PDF), Hadtörténelmi közlemények 1980 (volume 127, nr. 2)
- Hermann, Róbert (2004). Az 1848–1849-es szabadságharc nagy csatái ("Great battles of the Hungarian War of Independence of 1848–1849") (in Hungarian). Budapest: Zrínyi. ISBN 963-327-367-6.
- Hermann, Róbert (1997), "Kanizsa felszabadítása 1848. október 3-án (Kanizsa's Liberation on 3 October 1848)" (PDF), Zalai Múzeum 7
- Hermann, Róbert (2009). Magyarország története 14. Forradalom és szabadságharc 1848-1849 ("The history of Hungary 14. The Hungarian Revolution and War of Independence of 1848–1849) (in Hungarian). Budapest: Kossuth Kiadó. p. 112. ISBN 978-963-09-5692-5.
- Hermann, Róbert (2013). A magyar függetlenségi háború [Great Battles XV: The Hungarian Freedom War]. Nagy csaták. XV (in Hungarian). Budapest: Duna Könyvklub. ISBN 978-615-5013-997.
- Horváth, Gábor (2015). "Október 7. – Az ozorai ütközet. Ezen a napon történt. (7. October - The Battle of Ozora. This Day Happened)". Győri Szalon. Archived from the original on 2024-11-30.
- Kemény, Krisztián (2022), ""Oh, huszár, huszár! te vagy a magyar szeme fénye." Huszárok az 1848-49. évi magyar szabadságharcban ("Oh, hussar, hussar! You are the pride of Hungarians." Hussars in the Hungarian War of Independence of 1848-49)", Ars Militaria 15.03.2022
- Olchváry, Ödön (1999). A magyar függetlenségi harc 1848-1849-ben a Délvidéken (in Hungarian). Budapest: Márkus Samu Könyvnyomdája.
- Rédvay, István (1941). Huszáraink hazatérése 1848/49-ben ("Return of our Hussars in 1848/49) (PDF). Vitézi Rend Zrínyi Csoportja.
- Spira, György (1959). A magyar forradalom 1848–49-ben [The Hungarian Revolution in 1848–1849] (in Hungarian). Budapest: Gondolat Kiadó. p. 676.
- Szász, Zoltán (1986). Erdély története. III kötet. 1830-tól napjainkig ("History of Transylvania. Volume III. From 1830 to Present). Akadémiai Kiadó.
- Thim, József (1940). A magyarországi 1849-49-iki szerb fölkelés története I (History of the Serb Uprising in Hungary in 1848-49 vol. I) (PDF) (in Hungarian). Budapest: Magyar Történelmi Társulat.
- Vásárhelyi, Péter István (2013), "A karlócai ütközet (Battle of Karlóca)" (PDF), Hadtörténelmi közlemények 1980 (27. évf., 3 sz.)
