= Reformed Church, Ghidfalău =

Coordinates: 45.9019°N 25.8401°E

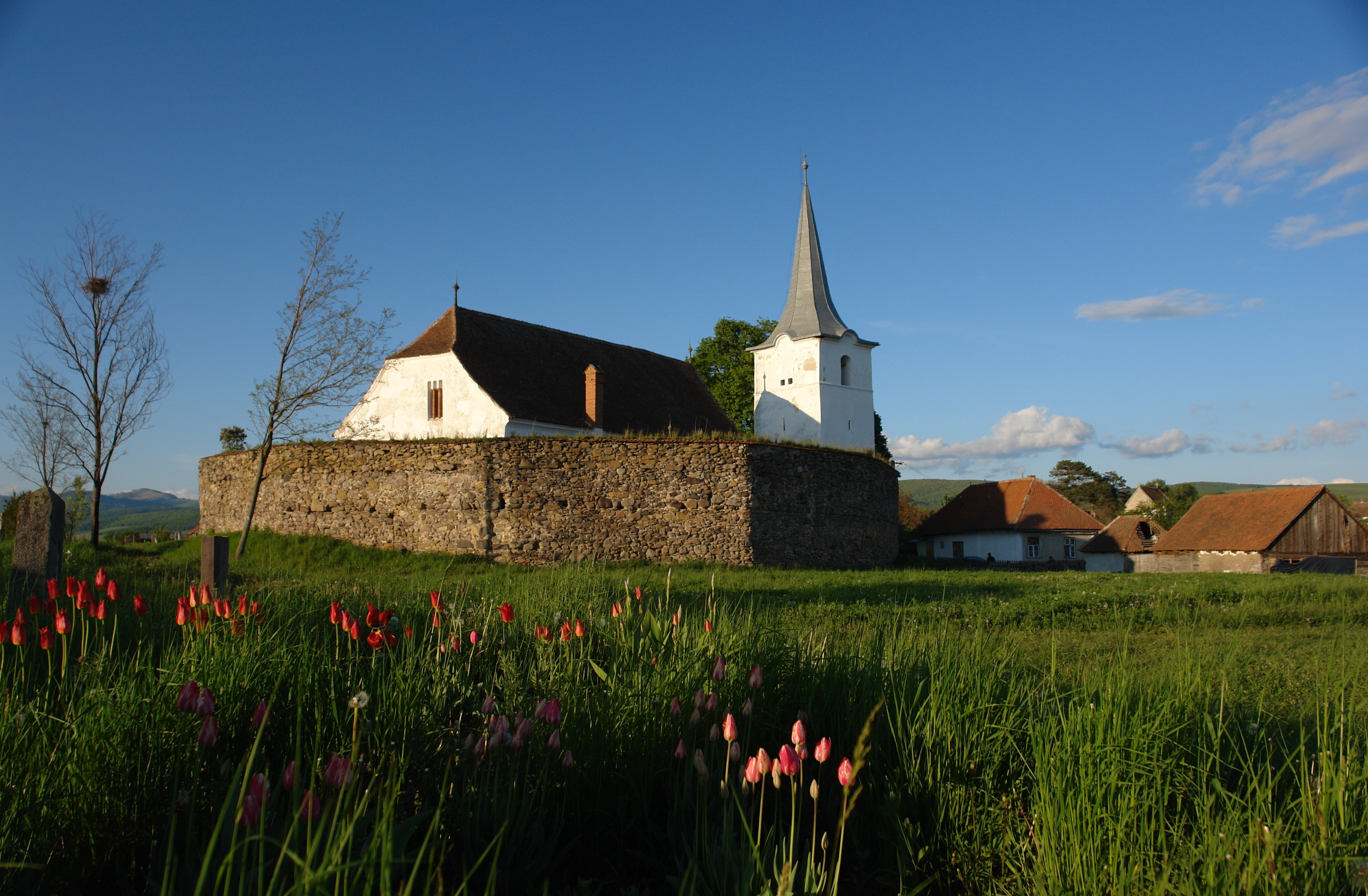

The Reformed church of Ghidfalău is a church on the edge of the village, on the hills surrounding the floodplain of the Olt River. It is a stronghold from the Middle Ages, which had an important role in the defence of the local citizens. It is one of those fortresses in Háromszék County which have been built by the residents of multiple municipalities.

== History ==
The municipality was first mentioned in a written form in 1332, under the name villa Guidonis. It was mentioned in 1420 as Gydofalva. In the registrum prepared in 1567. There is mentioned, that the village had 15 gates.

Gidófalva (today Ghidfalău) has had a church since 1332.

First church of the village was built in the 13th or 14th Century with an arch type closed sanctum. The narrow-windowed Romanesque nave is on the ruins of the old church, and its dimensions have not changed.

The building of the wall of fortress with the gates and loopholes began in the 15th or 16th century.

At the same time the church was rebuilt in the Gothic style. Octagonal, domed sanctum, closed in five directions, was built in this period.

It was burnt by the Tatars, but it was renovated in 1672, as is mentioned in an inscription above the main entrance.

The Southern entrance was built later, during the 16th or 17th century at the time of another renovation. The arcade is from 1787.

The structure of the church was damaged twice by earthquakes. Firstly in 1802, and again in 1816, when the ceiling paintings were brought down. At the first stage the tower was repaired and built further. The old balcony roof, made from shingle has been removed. At the same time a bell from 1642 has been refounded.

The old organ was replaced by a new one in 1817. It was donated by LajosBartha T. and his wife, Zsuzasnna T. Jancsó. The great bell was ready in 1834 and a newer bell was founded in 1968.

The Romanesque windows of the old church were removed in 1936.
