= Ghidfalău =

Ghidfalău Gidófalva
- Commune
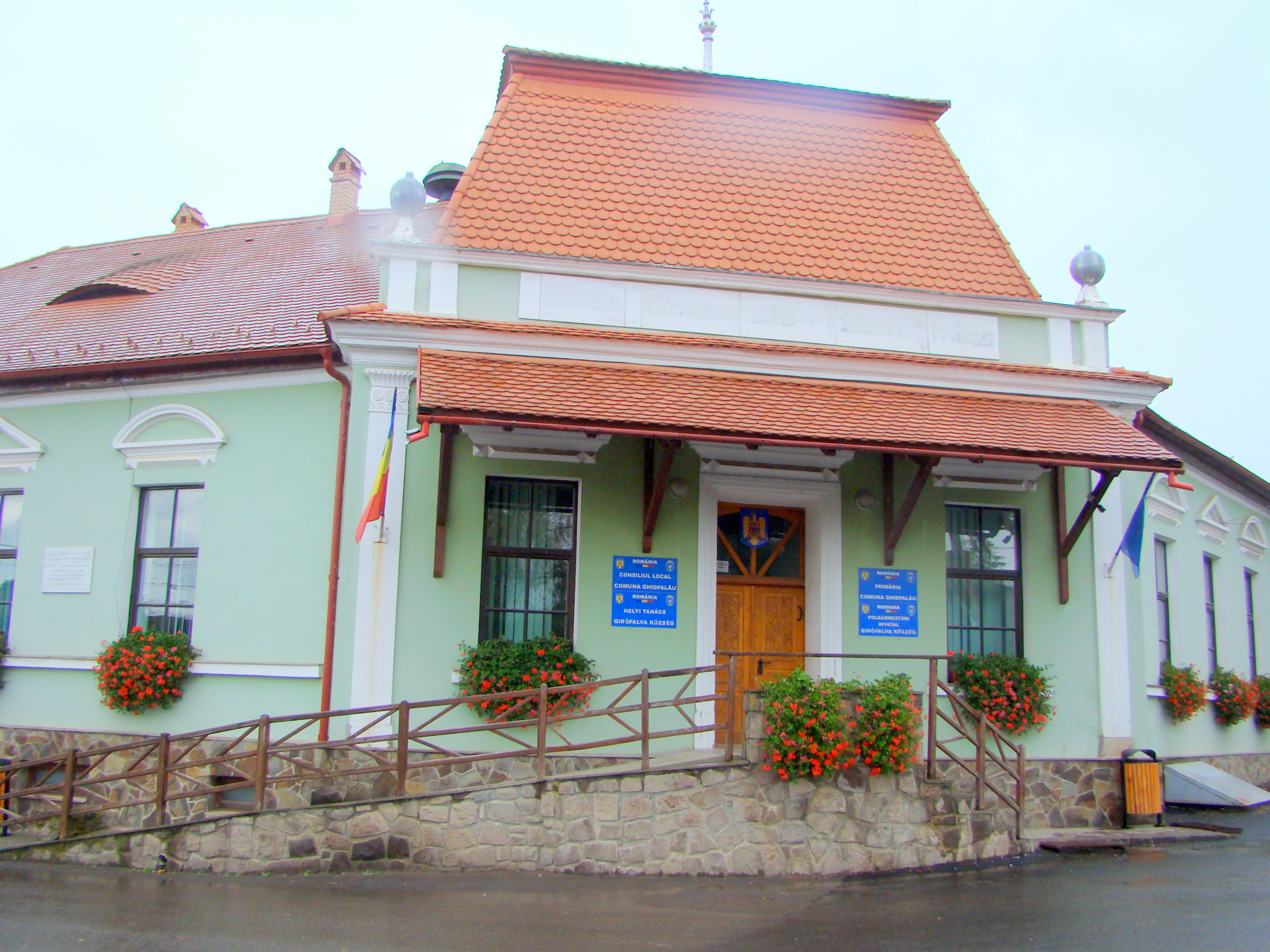
- Ghidfalău town hall

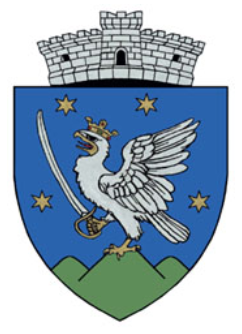
- Coat of arms

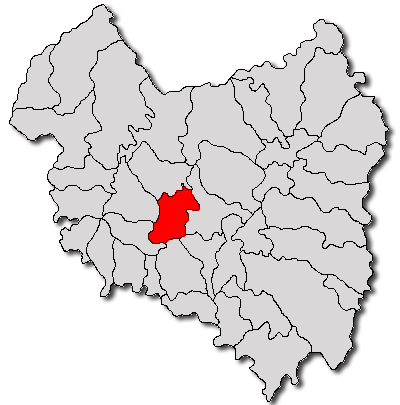
- Location in Covasna County

- Location in Romania
- Coordinates: 45°54′N 25°51′E
- Country: Romania
- County: Covasna

Government
  - Mayor (2020–2024): Ernő Jancsó (UDMR)
- Area: 42.00 km^{2} (16.22 sq mi)
- Elevation: 574 m (1,883 ft)
- Population (2021-12-01): 2,614
  - Density: 62.24/km^{2} (161.2/sq mi)
- Time zone: UTC+02:00 (EET)
  - Summer (DST): UTC+03:00 (EEST)
- Postal code: 527095
- Area code: (+40) 02 67
- Vehicle reg.: CV
- Website: primariaghidfalau.ro

Ghidfalău (Hungarian: Gidófalva, Hungarian pronunciation: [ˈɡidoːfɒlvɒ]) is a commune in Covasna County, Transylvania, Romania composed of four villages: Angheluș (Angyalos), Fotoș (Fotosmartonos), Ghidfalău, and Zoltan (Érfalvazoltán).

== Geography ==
The commune is located in the central part of Covasna County, 8 km (5 mi) northeast of the county seat, Sfântu Gheorghe. It is situated at an altitude of 574 m (1,883 ft), in the foothills of the Bodoc Mountains. It lies on the banks of the Olt River and its right tributary, Valea Crișului.

Ghidfalău is crossed by east to west by county road DJ121A. National road DN12 (part of European route E578) runs south to north at the western edge of the commune, while DN13E runs east to west at the southern edge.

== History ==
The settlement formed part of the Székely Land region of the historical Transylvania province. Until 1918, the village belonged to the Háromszék County of the Kingdom of Hungary. In the immediate aftermath of World War I, following the declaration of the Union of Transylvania with Romania, the area passed under Romanian administration during the Hungarian–Romanian War of 1918–1919. By the terms of the Treaty of Trianon of 1920, it became part of the Kingdom of Romania. In 1925, the commune fell in Plasa Sfântu Gheorghe of Trei Scaune County. In August 1940, under the auspices of Nazi Germany, which imposed the Second Vienna Award, Hungary retook the territory of Northern Transylvania (which included Ghidfalău) from Romania. Towards the end of World War II, however, the commune was taken back from Hungarian and German troops by Romanian and Soviet forces in September–October 1944. In 1950, after Communist Romania was established, Brateș became part of the Sfântu Gheorghe Raion of Stalin Region. From 1952 and 1960, it was part of the Magyar Autonomous Region, and between 1960 and 1968 it reverted to Brașov Region. In 1968, when Romania was reorganized based on counties rather than regions, the commune became part of Covasna County.

== Demographics ==
Historical population
| Year | Pop. | ±% |
|---|---|---|
| 1850 | 2,420 | — |
| 1966 | 2,759 | +14.0% |
| 2002 | 2,614 | −5.3% |
| 2011 | 2,660 | +1.8% |
| 2021 | 2,614 | −1.7% |
Source: Census data

The commune has an absolute Székely Hungarian majority. According to the 2011 census, it had a population of 2,660, of which 94.96% were Hungarians and 1.24% Romanians. At the 2021 census, Ghidfalău had a population of 2,614, of which 90.09% were Hungarians and 1.8% Romanians.

== Natives ==
- János Czetz (1822–1904), military commander during the Hungarian Revolution of 1848, and the organizer of Argentina's first national military academy
- Elek Forró (1813–1893), colonel during the Hungarian Revolution of 1848
- Gábor Kozsokár (born 1941), attorney and politician, member of the Romanian Senate

== Places of interest ==
- Reformed Church, Ghidfalău
