= János Czetz =

Hungarian freedom fighter

János Czetz; Hovhannes Czetzian Հովհաննես Ցեցյան
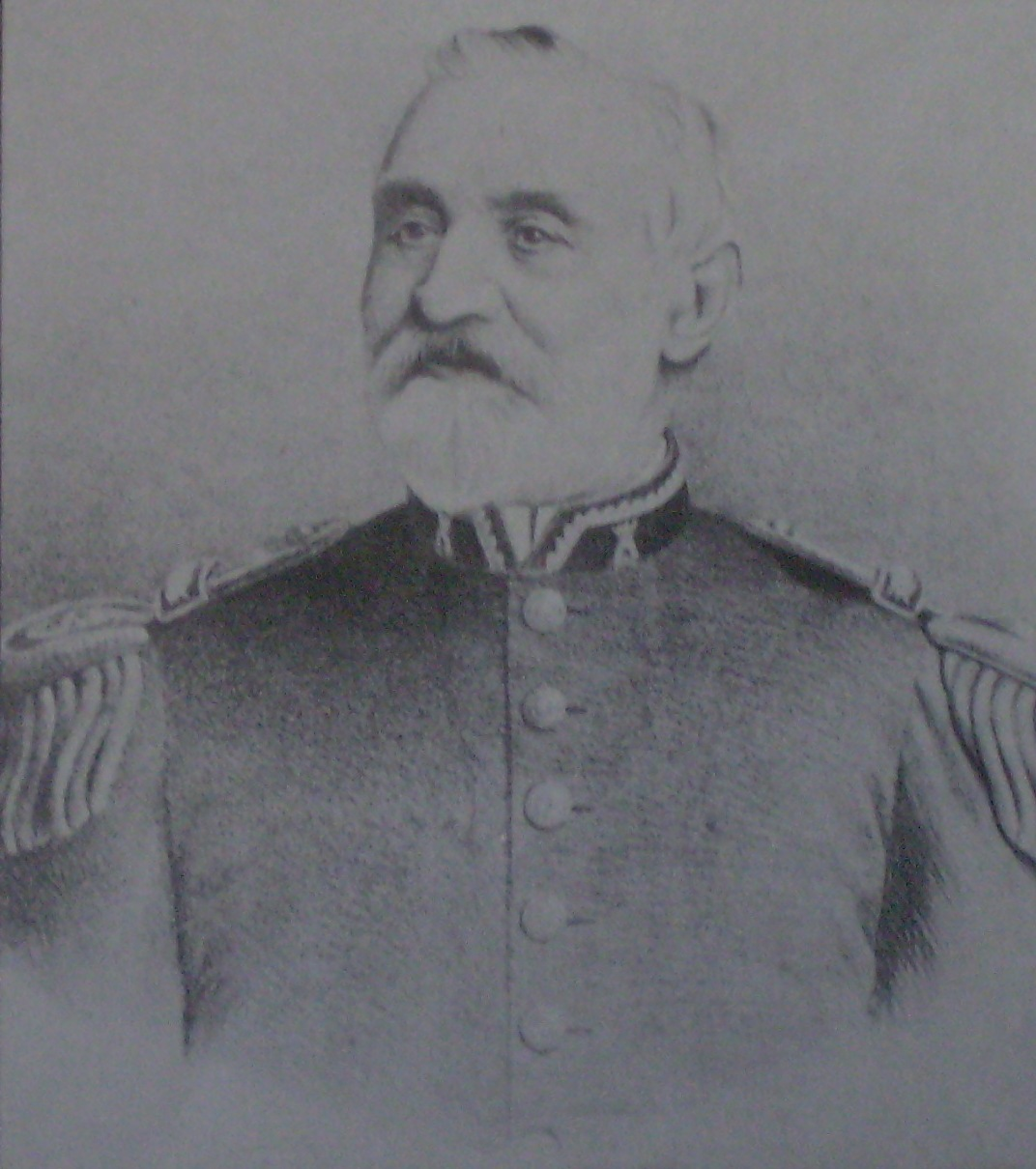
- Born: June 8, 1822; Habsburg monarchy, Gidófalva, Transylvania (now Ghidfalău, Covasna County, Romania)
- Died: September 6, 1904 (aged 82); Buenos Aires, Argentina
- Military career
- Service years: 1829
- Rank: General
- Conflicts: 1848-49 Hungarian revolution

János Czetz (June 8, 1822 – September 6, 1904) was a prominent Hungarian freedom fighter of Armenian and Hungarian-Székely origin, a military commander during the Hungarian Revolution of 1848, and the organizer of Argentina's first national military academy.

After the defeat, he emigrated to Germany and England. From there, he went to Spain, where he met Prudencio Rosas. Upon his return to England, he visited Juan Manuel de Rosas and married Basilia Ortiz de Rozas, daughter of Prudencio Rosas, in Seville. These connections convinced him that his future would lie in Argentina.

He arrived in Buenos Aires in 1860, and the following year revalidated his land surveyor's license and worked for a time in that profession in the south of the province of Buenos Aires. Under the influence of Lucio V. Mansilla—his wife's cousin—he was recruited into the Argentine Army, in the engineering section. He drew an official map of Argentina's borders with Paraguay and Brazil, the first using modern criteria and providing useful details as references. When the Paraguayan War broke out, he was promoted to colonel and called to the front, but an illness confined him to bed for months.

In 1866, he outlined the town of Rojas—near the border with the province of Santa Fe—and planned the railroad from the city of Santa Fe to Esperanza. He also laid out a road along the Dulce River from Santa Fe to Santiago del Estero.

Under President Domingo Faustino Sarmiento, he directed the advance of the border line with the indigenous people in southern Córdoba province, occupying some areas that had recently been occupied by Ranquel settlements. He was responsible for the construction of several forts in the area of what is now the city of General Villegas, Buenos Aires Province.

From 1870, Cztetz was one of the main organizers and first director of the National Military College, an important contributor to the military government of Argentine president Domingo Faustino Sarmiento. The collaboration helped Argentina become one of the most advanced armies outside of Europe. The strict discipline installed at the college and indirectly in the Army, helped bring an end to the long period of the Argentine civil wars. He published a "Treatise on permanent and temporary fortification".
