= Branko Gajin =

Serbian politician

Branko Gajin (Serbian Cyrillic: Бранко Гајин; born 5 November 1958) is a politician in Serbia. He was the mayor of Srbobran from 2004 to 2012 and served in the Assembly of Vojvodina from 2008 to 2011. For much of his time as an elected official, Gajin was not a member of any political party.

== Private career ==
Gajin is a lawyer and has been the co-owner of the pharmacy "Eliksir" in Srbobran.

== Politician ==
Gajin sought election to the National Assembly of Serbia in the 1990 parliamentary election, running in the division of Temerin and Srbobran with a combined endorsement from the Serbian Renewal Movement and the People's Radical Party. He was defeated by Milan Krčedinac of the Socialist Party of Serbia.

Serbia introduced the direct election of mayors in the 2004 local elections, and Gajin was elected as mayor of Srbobran as an independent candidate, leading a local citizens' group called the "Alliance for Srbobran." He subsequently joined the Democratic Party of Serbia (Demokratska stranka Srbije, DSS), although he resigned his membership in June 2007, citing (among other things) the DSS's delay in forming a government at the republic level.

The direct election of mayors was abandoned after 2004; in all local election cycles since then, mayors have been chosen by the elected members of city and municipal assemblies. Gajin led his independent electoral list to victory in the 2008 local elections with thirteen out of twenty-eight mandates, and he was chosen afterwards for a second term as mayor. He was also elected to the Assembly of Vojvodina in the concurrent 2008 Vojvodina provincial election as an independent candidate in the Srbobran constituency. He resigned from the latter role on 24 October 2011, after restrictions were introduced on holding dual mandates.

Gajin announced an alliance between his movement and the Democratic Party (Demokratska stranka, DS) in Srbobran in 2009. In the 2012 local elections, he sought re-election as mayor at the head of a combined list. The list won a plurality victory with nine mandates, but the Socialist Party (which finished second) was able to form a coalition government with other parties, and Gajin's term as mayor came to an end.

He later left the DS and again led his own list in the 2016 local elections. The list finished in second place with seven mandates; the Serbian Progressive Party won the election and was subsequently able to form a new government. Gajin served in the assembly until 2020 and was not a candidate in that year's municipal election.

== Electoral record ==
=== Assembly of Vojvodina ===
2008 Vojvodina assembly election Srbobran (constituency seat) – first and second rounds
Candidate	Party or Coalition	Votes	%	Votes	%
Branko Gajin	Citizens' Group: Branko Gajin	2,947	33.55	3,924	70.70
Goranka Ašćević	Serbian Radical Party	1,718	19.56	1,626	29.30
Deže Nemet	Hungarian Coalition–István Pásztor	994	11.32		
Milan Trifunović	Together for Vojvodina-Nenad Čanak	798	9.08		
Dušan Mihajlović	Citizens' Group: For a Better Srbobran, Turija, and Nadalj–Dušan Mihajlović	668	7.60		
Mirko Paroški	Democratic Party	517	5.89		
Milinko Madžgalj	Party: As One House	482	5.49		
Zoran Knješko	Socialist Party of Serbia (SPS)–Party of United Pensioners of Serbia (PUPS)	280	3.19		
Sava Pivinčki	Liberal Democratic Party	238	2.71		
Milan Stanaćev	Democratic Party of Serbia–New Serbia–Vojislav Koštunica	142	1.62		
Total valid votes		8,784	100	5,550	100
Invalid ballots		297		80	
Total votes casts		9,081	64.34	5,630	39.89

=== Municipality of Srbobran ===
2004 Srbobran municipal election Mayor of Srbobran – second round Results
Candidate	Party or Coalition	Votes	%
Branko Gajin	Citizens' Group: Alliance for Our Municipality of Srbobran	3,608	57.72
Bore Kutić	Serbian Radical Party–Tomislav Nikolić	2,643	42.48
Total valid votes		6,251	100

=== National Assembly of Serbia ===
1990 Serbian parliamentary election Member for Temerin and Srbobran
Candidate	Party or Coalition	Result
Branko Gajin	Serbian Renewal Movement/People's Radical Party	
Borus Janoš	Union of Reform Forces of Yugoslavia for Vojvodina/Association for the Yugoslav Democratic Initiative	
Milan Krčedinac	Socialist Party of Serbia	elected
Radivoj Kulačin	Democratic Party (Davidović-Grol)	
Slobodan Mandić	Citizens' Group	
Nikola Pilipović	Citizens' Group	
Ištvan Ternovac	Democratic Fellowship of Vojvodina Hungarians	
