= Milan Dunđerski =

Serbian poet and politician

Milan Dunđerski (Serbian Cyrillic: Милан Дунђерски; 26 February 1952 – 10 December 2007) was a Serbian poet, cultural figure, and politician. Several anthologies of his poetry were published during his lifetime, and a literary award for students was established in his name after his death.

Dunđerski was a member of the Democratic Party (DS) and was active in Serbian politics in the 1990s and 2000s. An opponent of nationalism in the Serb community, he was elected mayor of Srbobran in 1996 and served in the Vojvodina provincial assembly from 1997 to 2007.

== Early life and literary career ==
Dunđerski was born in Srbobran in 1952, to a family not directly related to the prominent landowners of the same name. He began publishing poetry as a student in 1970 and became active with Radio Srbobran in the same period. He was a member of the editorial board of the youth journal Tribine mladih from 1973 to 1977 and for Polja magazine from 1976 to 1984. Dunđerski received several awards for his work, including the "October Award" from the municipality of Srbobran in 1973 and the Stražilovo award for his second collection of poetry in 1980. In 1981, one of his works was translated into Hungarian and published in the newspaper Magyar Szó; several other poems written by Dunđerski would be translated into Hungarian in later years.

After graduating from the University of Novi Sad Faculty of Philosophy in Yugoslav literature in 1981, Dunđerski worked as a Serbian language teacher in Srbobran and was the director of Radio Srbobran for ten years.

Described as "a dedicated intellectual of the left orientation," Dunđerski was strongly critical of the rise of nationalism in Serbia in the 1990s. In 1992, he received an award from the Association of the Broadcasting Organization of Vojvodina for an essay opposing war, the nationalist co-option of culture, and the suppression of freedom of thought. His political views led to personal difficulties during this period, given the authoritarian nature of Serbia's government under Slobodan Milošević in the 1990s.

In 2004, Dunđerski was appointed to the board of directors of Matica srpska.

== Politician ==
=== Before 2000 ===
Dunđerski was a founding member of the Democratic Party in Srbobran. In 1996, the DS joined an alliance of opposition parties known as Zajedno, and in that year's local elections Dunđerski was elected to the Sbrobran municipal assembly as a candidate of the alliance. The election did not produce a clear winner in the municipality: Zajedno won ten seats out of twenty-eight, the governing Socialist Party of Serbia (SPS) won nine, and the other nine seats were won by other parties and independent candidates. Zajedno was ultimately able to form a coalition government, and when the assembly convened on 20 December 1996 Dunđerski was chosen as president of the assembly, a position that was then equivalent to mayor. Available online sources do not indicate if he served for a full term.

Dunđerski was also elected to the Vojvodina assembly in the 1996 provincial election, which took place concurrently with the local vote. The Socialist Party of Serbia won a majority victory in the provincial contest, and the Zajedno members served in opposition for the term that followed.

=== 2000 and after ===
The Democratic Party joined a new opposition coalition called the Democratic Opposition of Serbia (DOS) in early 2000. SPS leader Slobodan Milošević was defeated by DOS candidate Vojislav Koštunica in the 2000 Yugoslavian presidential election and fell from power on 5 October 2000, a watershed moment in Serbian and Yugoslavian politics.

The 2000 presidential vote took place concurrently with the 2000 Serbian local elections and the 2000 Vojvodina provincial election. In Srbobran, the DOS formed a broad-based coalition with other opposition parties in the local elections and afterward formed a new coalition government. Dunđerski was re-elected to the local assembly but did not serve for a second term as mayor. He was also re-elected to the Vojvodina assembly in the provincial vote, as the DOS and its allies won a landslide majority victory across the province.

The DOS subsequently dissolved, and Dunđerski was re-elected to the provincial assembly as a Democratic Party candidate in the 2004 Vojvodina election. The far-right Serbian Radical Party (SRS) won a narrow plurality victory over the DS in terms of seat totals, but the DS formed a new coalition government after the election, and Dunđerski again served as a supporter of the administration.

== Death ==
Dunđerski died on 10 December 2007 following a long illness. The Democratic Party held a memorial service the following day in the Srbobran municipal assembly.

== Literary award ==
In 2019, the National Library in Sbrobran introduced the Milan Dunđerski award, to be given annually for student poetry written in Serbian and Hungarian.

== Published anthologies ==
- Okovan rebrima (1973)
- Mrtva priroda (1979)
- Anatom senke (1986)
- Pluralia tantum ili Mesec iznad Tise (2003)
- Pesme 1973-2007 (2008)
- Pesnik je poput Prometeja (2018)

== Electoral record ==
=== Provincial (Vojvodina) ===
2004 Vojvodina provincial election: Srbobran
Candidate	Party	First round		Second round	
Candidate	Party	Votes	%	Votes	%
Milan Dunđerski (incumbent)	Democratic Party–Boris Tadić	1,432	23.43	3,308	53.28
Bore Kutić	Serbian Radical Party	1,815	29.70	2,901	46.72
Ferenc Čuzdi	Coalition: Together for Vojvodina-Nenad Čanak	1,343	21.97		
Nestor Golubski	Socialist Party of Serbia	688	11.26		
Nada Vranjković	Strength of Serbia Movement	506	8.28		
Milan Nenadov	Serbian Renewal Movement	328	5.37		
Total		6,112	100.00	6,209	100.00
Valid votes		6,112	94.57	6,209	97.40
Invalid/blank votes		351	5.43	166	2.60
Total votes		6,463	100.00	6,375	100.00

2000 Vojvodina provincial election: Srbobran
Candidate	Party	First round		Second round	
Candidate	Party	Votes	%	Votes	%
Milan Dunđerski (incumbent)	Democratic Opposition of Serbia (Affiliation: Democratic Party)	3,379			elected
Živojin Popgligorin	Socialist Party of Serbia–Yugoslav Left	1,885			defeated
Dušan Mihajlović	Citizens' Group	1,211			defeated
Bore Kutić	Serbian Radical Party		eliminated		
other candidates?					
Total					

1996 Vojvodina provincial election: Srbobran (Second Round)
Candidate	Party	Votes	%
Milan Dunđerski	Zajedno (Coalition Together) (Affiliation: Democratic Party)		elected
Miroslav Karać	Serbian Radical Party		
Dušan Mihajlović	Citizens' Group: Turija		
Total			
Source: Karać and Mihajlović are listed alphabetically.

=== Local (Srborban) ===
2000 Sbrobran municipal election: Division 4
Candidate	Party	Votes	%
Milan Dunđerski (incumbent for Division 4)	Democratic Opposition of Serbia (Affiliation: Democratic Party)		elected
Nikola Šešević	Serbian Radical Party		
other candidates?			
Total			

1996 Sbrobran municipal election: Division 3
Candidate	Party	Votes	%
Milan Dunđerski	Zajedno (Coalition Together) (Affiliation: Democratic Party)		elected in the second round
Slobodan Adžić	Socialist Party of Serbia		defeated in the second round
other candidates?			
Total			
