= Bore Kutić =

Serbian politician (born 1955)

Bore Kutić (Serbian Cyrillic: Боре Кутић; born 1955) is a politician in Serbia. He served in the National Assembly of Serbia from 2004 to 2007 and in the Assembly of Vojvodina from 2008 to 2020. Initially a member of the far-right Serbian Radical Party, he joined the Serbian Progressive Party on its formation in 2008.

== Private career ==
Kutić is a lawyer and criminologist. He is from Nadalj, in the municipality of Srbobran.

== Politician ==
=== Member of the National Assembly ===
Kutić was given the 104th position on the Radical Party's electoral list in the 2003 Serbian parliamentary election. The party won eighty-two mandates, and Kutić was subsequently selected for its assembly delegation. (From 2000 to 2011, mandates in Serbian assembly elections were awarded to parties or coalitions rather than individual candidates, and it was common practice for the mandates to be assigned out of numerical order. Kutić's list position had no formal bearing on whether or not he received a mandate.) The Radical Party emerged from the election with the largest number of seats, but it fell well short of a majority and ultimately served in opposition. Kutić served as a Radical Party parliamentarian for the next three years.

Kutić also appeared on the Radical Party's lists in the 2007 and 2008 parliamentary elections, although he was not selected for a mandate on either occasion.

=== Provincial politics ===
Kutić sought election to the Vojvodina provincial assembly for the Srbobran division in the 2000 provincial election and was defeated in the first round of voting. This was the last provincial election in which all members were elected for constituency seats; subsequently, the province introduced a system of mixed proportional representation in which half the members were elected on party lists and the other half for constituency seats. Kutić sought election for Srbobran again in the 2004 provincial election and was defeated in the second round of voting.

He received the forty-eighth position on the Radical Party's electoral list in the 2008 provincial election. The list won twenty seats, and he was selected for a mandate. The Democratic Party and its allies won the election, and the Radicals again served in opposition.

The Radical Party experienced a serious split later in 2008, with several members joining the more moderate Progressive Party under the leadership of Tomislav Nikolić and Aleksandar Vučić. Kutić sided with the Progressives and was a founding member of their parliamentary group in the assembly.

Serbia's electoral system was reformed in 2011, such that mandates were awarded in numerical order to candidates on successful lists. Kutić was given the fourth position on the Progressive Party's list in the 2012 provincial election and was re-elected when the list won fourteen mandates. The election won again won the by the Democratic Party, and Kutić remained an opposition member for the next four years.

Vojvodina switched to a system of full proportional representation prior to the 2016 provincial election. Kutić was given the twenty-first position on the Progressive list and was elected to a third term when the list won a majority victory with sixty-three out of 120 mandates. After the election, he was appointed as chair of the committee for co-operation with the committees on the national assembly in exercising the competencies of the province. He subsequently chaired the committee for inter-communal relations in Vojvodina. He did not seek re-election in 2020.

=== Municipal politics ===
Kutić has also been active in the municipal politics of Srbobran. He was the Radical Party's candidate for mayor of the municipality in the 2004 Serbian local elections and was defeated by independent candidate Branko Gajin in the second round. (This was the only electoral cycle since 1990 in which mayors of Serbian cities and municipalities were directly elected.)

He subsequently appeared in the lead position on the Radical Party's list for the municipal assembly in the 2008 local elections, although he did not claim a mandate afterwards. He received the third position on the Progressive Party's list in the 2012 local elections and was elected when the list won four mandates. He resigned his mandate on 23 August 2012.

== Electoral record ==
=== Provincial (Vojvodina) ===
2004 Vojvodina provincial election: Srbobran
Candidate	Party	First round		Second round	
Candidate	Party	Votes	%	Votes	%
Milan Dunđerski (incumbent)	Democratic Party–Boris Tadić	1,432	23.43	3,308	53.28
Bore Kutić	Serbian Radical Party	1,815	29.70	2,901	46.72
Ferenc Čuzdi	Coalition: Together for Vojvodina-Nenad Čanak	1,343	21.97		
Nestor Golubski	Socialist Party of Serbia	688	11.26		
Nada Vranjković	Strength of Serbia Movement	506	8.28		
Milan Nenadov	Serbian Renewal Movement	328	5.37		
Total		6,112	100.00	6,209	100.00
Valid votes		6,112	94.57	6,209	97.40
Invalid/blank votes		351	5.43	166	2.60
Total votes		6,463	100.00	6,375	100.00

2000 Vojvodina provincial election: Srbobran
Candidate	Party	First round		Second round	
Candidate	Party	Votes	%	Votes	%
Milan Dunđerski (incumbent)	Democratic Opposition of Serbia (Affiliation: Democratic Party)	3,379			elected
Živojin Popgligorin	Socialist Party of Serbia–Yugoslav Left	1,885			defeated
Dušan Mihajlović	Citizens' Group	1,211			defeated
Bore Kutić	Serbian Radical Party		eliminated		
other candidates?					
Total					

=== Municipality of Srbobran ===
2004 Srbobran municipal election Mayor of Srbobran – second round Results
Candidate	Party or Coalition	Votes	%
Branko Gajin	Citizens' Group: Alliance for Our Municipality of Srbobran	3,608	57.72
Bore Kutić	Serbian Radical Party–Tomislav Nikolić	2,643	42.48
Total valid votes		6,251	100
