= Ljiljana Plazačić =

Serbian politician

Ljiljana Plazačić (Serbian Cyrillic: Љиљана Плазачић; born 1985) is a politician in Serbia. She has served in the Assembly of Serbia since 2020 as a member of the Serbian Progressive Party.

== Private career ==
Plazačić is a pre-school teacher. She lives in Srbobran.

== Politician ==
=== Municipal politics ===
Plazačić received the nineteenth position on the Progressive Party's electoral list for the Srbobran municipal assembly in the 2016 Serbian local elections and was not initially elected when the list won a plurality victory with eleven out of twenty-eight seats. She was awarded a mandate on 5 December 2017 as the replacement for another party member and served in the assembly for the next three years. She did not seek re-election at the local level in 2020.

=== Assembly of Vojvodina ===
Plazačić was given the fifty-fifth position on the Progressive-led Aleksandar Vučić — For Our Children list in the 2020 Vojvodina provincial election and was elected when the list won a majority victory with seventy-six out of 120 seats. She is now a member of the assembly committee on education and science and the committee on organization of administration and local self-government.
