= Beljanski =

Beljanski is a surname. Notable people with the surname include:

- Bojan Beljanski (born 1986), Serbian handball player
- Mirko Beljanski (1923–1998), French-Serbian molecular biologist
- Pavle Beljanski (1892–1965), Serbian lawyer and diplomat
  - The Pavle Beljanski Memorial Collection, a public art museum in Novi Sad, Serbia
