= Macheboeuf =

Macheboeuf is a French surname. Notable people with the surname include:

- Joseph Projectus Machebeuf (1812–1889), French Bishop of Denver
- Michel Macheboeuf (1900–1953), French biochemist
