= Turija Kobasicijada =

Kobasicijada
- Genre: Sausage festival
- Locations: Turija, near Srbobran
- Country: Serbia
- Attendance: Tens of thousands

Kobasicijada is an international sausage festival organized annually in the village of Turija, near Srbobran, Serbia. 32 festivals had been held as of February, 2017; it is one of the biggest and most popular village festivals in Serbia. The festival is attended by tens of thousands of people every year.
