= Teodora Dunđerski =

Teodora Dora Dunđerski (Cyrillic: Теодора Дора Дунђерски; 1887/1888 – 23 February 1965) was a Serbian courtier and a public worker.

== Biography ==
Teodora Dunđerski was born in Srbobran, in 1887 or 1888 into the prestigious and old Vlahovic family who included several generations of intellectuals in Vojvodina. Her father, Ivan, was a lawyer. She finished elementary school in her native town and lower secondary school in Eger. She married the industrialist and landowner Gedeon Dungeorge. They had two sons, Lazarus (1903-1956) and Dusan (1905–1977), as well as one daughter, Sofya (1907-?), who married Count Tivadar Deževi.

Dunđerski was active in many humanitarian, cultural, and patriotic societies and institutions. She was the head of the Red Cross of Vojvodina, which included 396 municipalities of Banat, Bačka, and Baranja, from 1918 to 1924. She was unanimously elected to lead the newly-founded Pushing Field Committee and was there until 1934, when the Banovina Committee was established, which she chaired until 1936. For many years, she was the president of the Charity Cooperative of Srpkinja Novosatkinja. Having the reputation of a pleasant and educated woman, in 1922, she was appointed to serve as a lady at the court of Queen Maria. Her duties included staying at the court in Belgrade twice a week.

For her services to the nation, she was honored by the Order of St. Sava, III and II degrees; the 4th degree of the Yugoslav krone, the Cross of the Red Cross, the Bulgarian First Class I, and the 1st Belgian Red Cross. She died in Novi Sad on 23 February 1965 and was buried in Srbobran in a family chapel.
