= Mirko Beljanski =

Serbian-French molecular biologist (1923–1998)

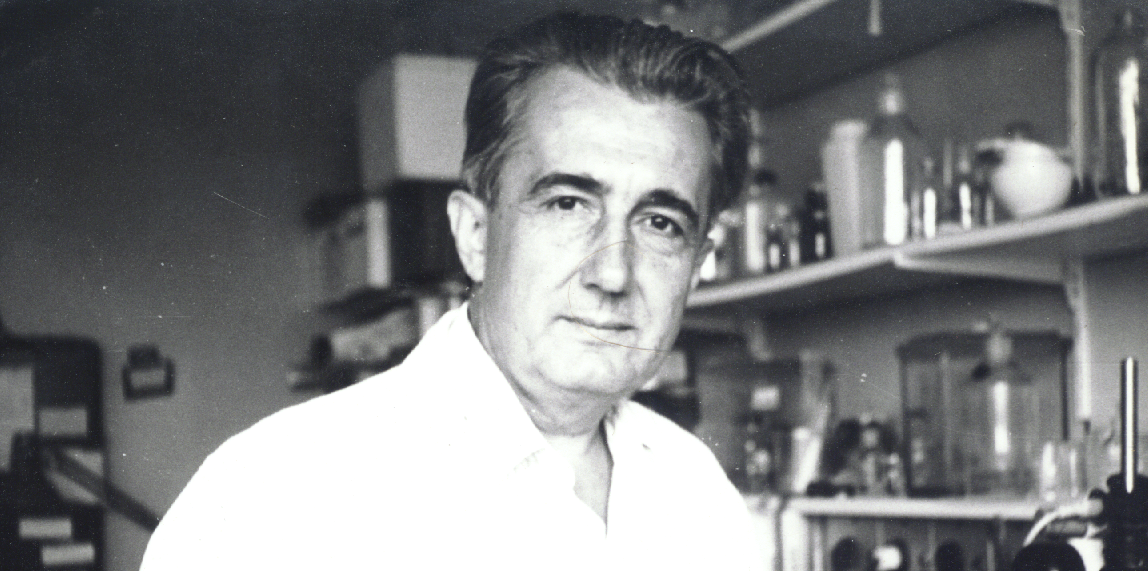
- Born: 27 March 1923; Turija, Yugoslavia
- Died: 27 October 1998 (aged 75); Paris, France
- Education: University of Paris
- Spouse: Monique Lucas
- Children: 2
- Awards: Charles-Léopold Mayer Prize (1960)
- Scientific career
- Fields: Molecular biology
- Workplaces: Pasteur Institute
- Doctoral advisor: Michel Macheboeuf

Mirko Beljanski (27 March 1923 – 27 October 1998) was a French-Serbian molecular biologist who studied bacteria, its resistance to antibiotics and the interaction of RNA and DNA. He performed research at the CNRS and also the Pasteur Institute, discovering reverse transcriptase in bacteria in 1971. His later research focused on therapeutic concepts, anticancer and antiviral remedies.

== Early life and education ==
Beljanski was born in 1923 in Yugoslavia. His father was an iron worker, his mother a seamstress, and had two older sisters. He attended lyceum in Novi Sad while living with an uncle. After World War II, he received educational offers from the Yugoslavian government to study in either Moscow or Paris. He decided to study in France where he met and married Monique Lucas, daughter of René Lucas and granddaughter of Pauline Ramart.

He received a PhD in 1948 from the University of Paris and began working at the Pasteur Institute in Paris as a researcher in molecular biology.

== Career ==
While at the Pasteur Institute, Beljanski's early research focused on the study of the origin of bacterial resistance to streptomycin. During this time he studied the interaction of RNA and DNA and the resistance of bacterial strains to antibiotics. He published several articles on how bacteria accumulated RNAs during the acquisition of resistance to different antibiotics. In 1951, the grant Beljanski was working under expired but he was allowed to stay in France to continue his research. He worked at the Institute with Michel Macheboeuf, but left in 1953 upon the death of Macheboeuf. He joined the CNRS where he continued his research.

Beljanski returned to the Pasteur Institute in 1959 where he worked alongside his wife Monique and under Jacques Monod, the new head of the Pasteur Institute. In 1971, Beljanski discovered reverse transcriptase in bacteria. This was part of a larger research on DNA and RNA that led him to oppose the central dogma of molecular biology promoted by Monod, head of the Pasteur Institute. After he pursued his work against the advice of the Institute, Beljanski was made to leave in 1978, but still continued to publish scientific papers. He also obtained patents.

While at the Faculty of Pharmacy, Beljanski focused his research on radiation protection. Beljanski believed he had found antivirals effective against cancer and AIDS. A product made of flavopereirin, extracted from the Brazilian Pao pereira tree and called PB100 was claimed to be superior to AZT, which Beljanski called "real poison". Another molecule was rauvolfia vomitoria's alstonine. After his mandatory retirement in 1988, Beljanski opened a research center in Isère, focusing on his therapeutic concepts, anticancer and antiviral remedies. His compounds were used in France and other European countries.

In 1994, Beljanski was charged with illicit practice of medicine, later being found not guilty of the charges. He was subsequently charged by the French Department of Health for the illicit practice of pharmacy in 1995, but died in 1998 before the case was heard in court. During this time, French President François Mitterrand received treatment for prostate cancer which included the use of Beljanski's products. In 1996, Beljanski's laboratory was seized after the death of Mitterrand. In 2002, the European Court of Human Rights ruled that the length of a second criminal investigation had been excessive and made a financial award to his widow.

== Death and legacy ==
Beljanski died from cancer in Paris on 27 October 1998. A namesake foundation was launched for Beljanski in 1999. The Foundation, with a branch in the United States focuses on environmental toxins and is based on the research of Beljanski.

== Publications ==
- Mirko Beljanski (1983). The Regulation of DNA Replication and Transcription (3 ed.). Demos Medical (2013). ISBN 9781620700198.

== See also ==
- Alternative cancer treatments
