= Church of the Transfer of the Relics of the Holy Father Nicholas, Turija =

Church of the Transfer of the Relics of the Holy Father Nicholas
- Црква преноса моштију светог оца Николаја
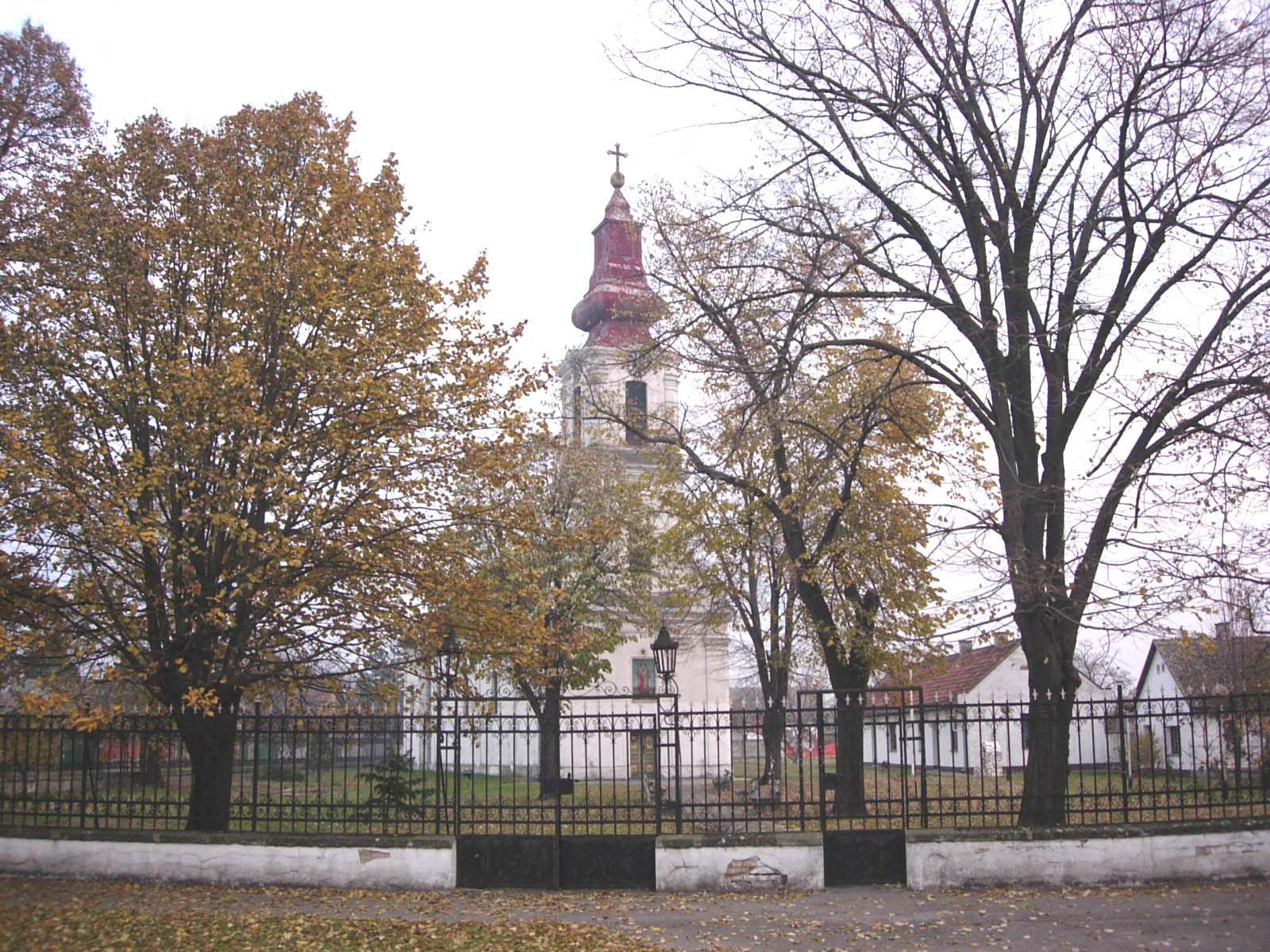
- Church of the Transfer of the Relics of the Holy Father Nicholas
- 45°32′17″N 19°51′26″E
- Location: Turija, Vojvodina
- Country: Serbia
- Denomination: Serbian Orthodox

History
- Status: Church
- Dedication: St Nicholas

Architecture
- Functional status: Active
- Style: Baroque

Administration
- Archdiocese: Eparchy of Bačka

Church of the Transfer of the Relics of the Holy Father Nicholas (Serbian Cyrillic: Црква преноса моштију светог оца Николаја) is a Serbian Orthodox church in Turija, in Vojvodina, Serbia. The church was built in 1754 and since 1991 it is inscribed as an immovable cultural heritage monument. The iconostasis of the church was painted by the academic artist Jovan Kljajić in 1841.

== See also ==
- Eparchy of Bačka
