= Turija, Srbobran =

Village in Srbobran municipality, Serbia

Turija Турија (Serbian)
- Village (Selo)
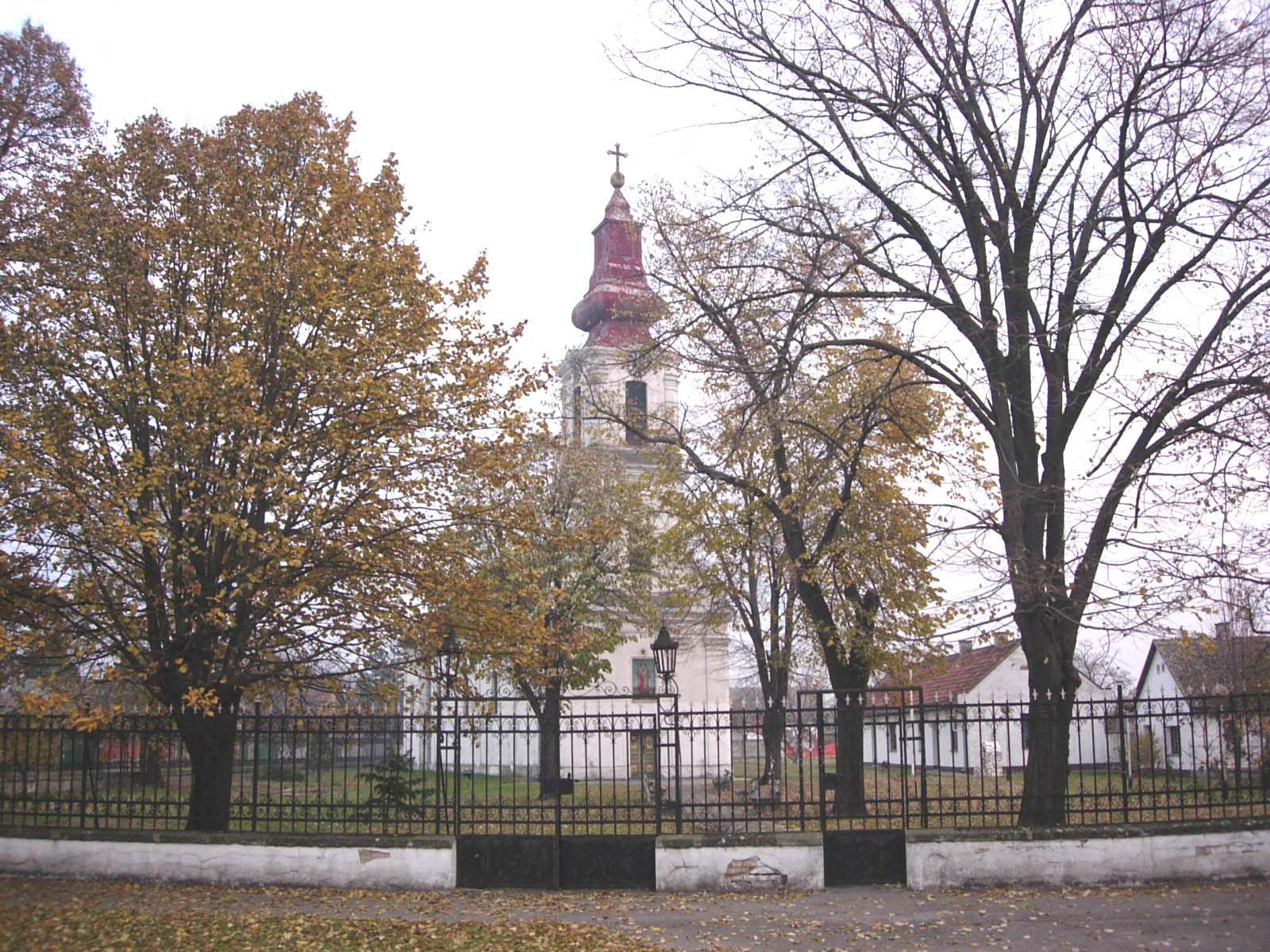
- Church of the Transfer of the relics of the Holy Father Nicholas

- Location within Vojvodina Location within Serbia Location within Europe
- Coordinates: 45°32′15″N 19°51′26″E
- Country: Serbia
- Province: Vojvodina
- Region: Bačka (Podunavlje)
- District: South Bačka
- Municipality: Srbobran

Population (2011)
  - Total: 2,300
- Time zone: UTC+1 (CET)
  - Summer (DST): UTC+2 (CEST)

Turija (Serbian Cyrillic: Турија) is a village located in the Srbobran municipality, in the South Bačka District of Serbia. It is situated in the Autonomous Province of Vojvodina. The village has a Serb ethnic majority and its population numbering 2,562 people (2002 census). The village is famous because of the annual sausage festival known as Kobasicijada that is organized in Turija every year.

== Historical population ==
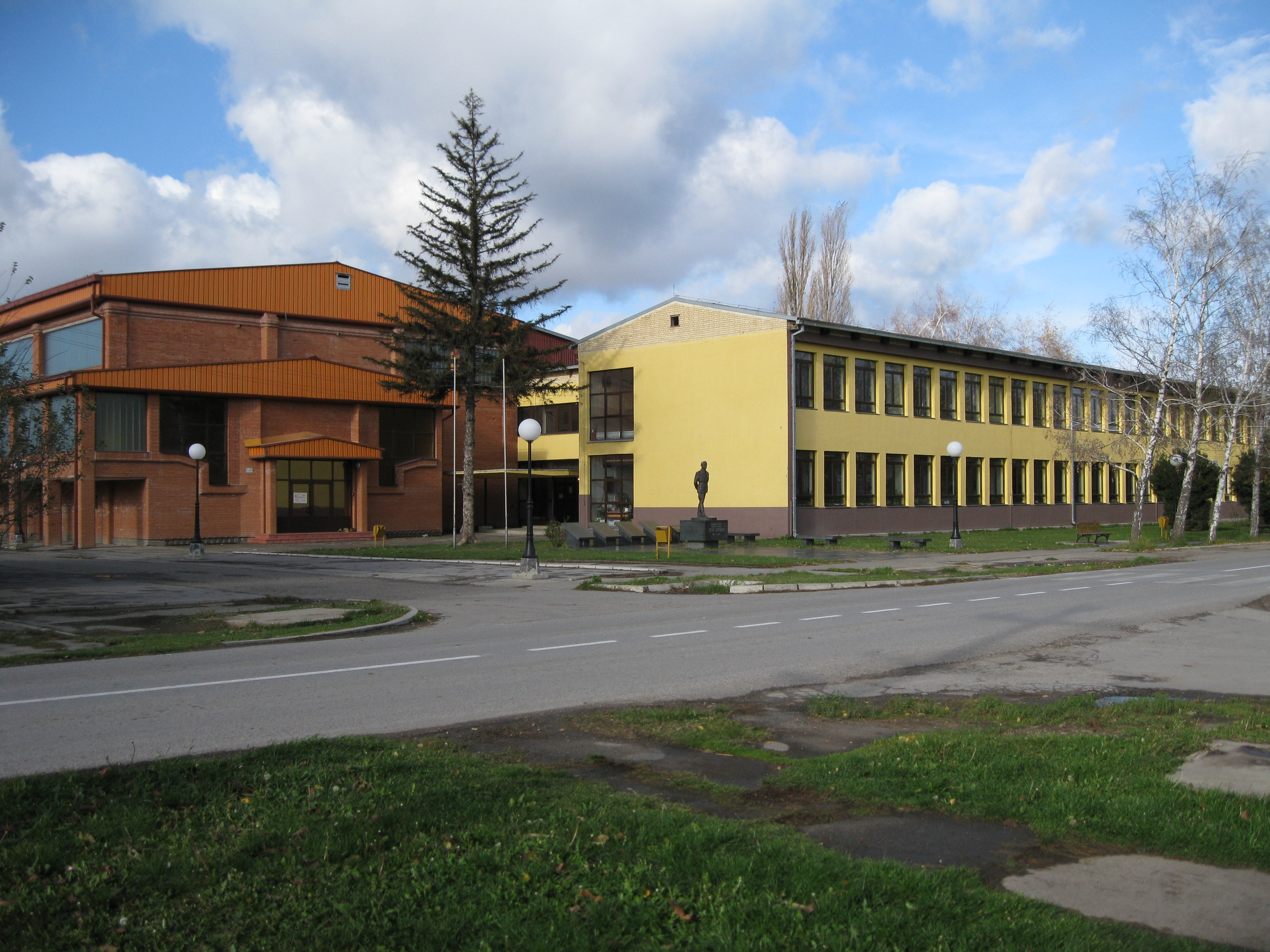
Turija elementary school

- 1961: 3,582
- 1971: 3,242
- 1981: 2,935
- 1991: 2,615

== See also ==
- Kobasicijada
- List of places in Serbia
- List of cities, towns and villages in Vojvodina

== Notable residents ==
- Mirko Beljanski
- Petar Drapšin
