= Nadalj =

Nadalj Надаљ (Serbian) Nádalja (Hungarian)
- Village (Selo)
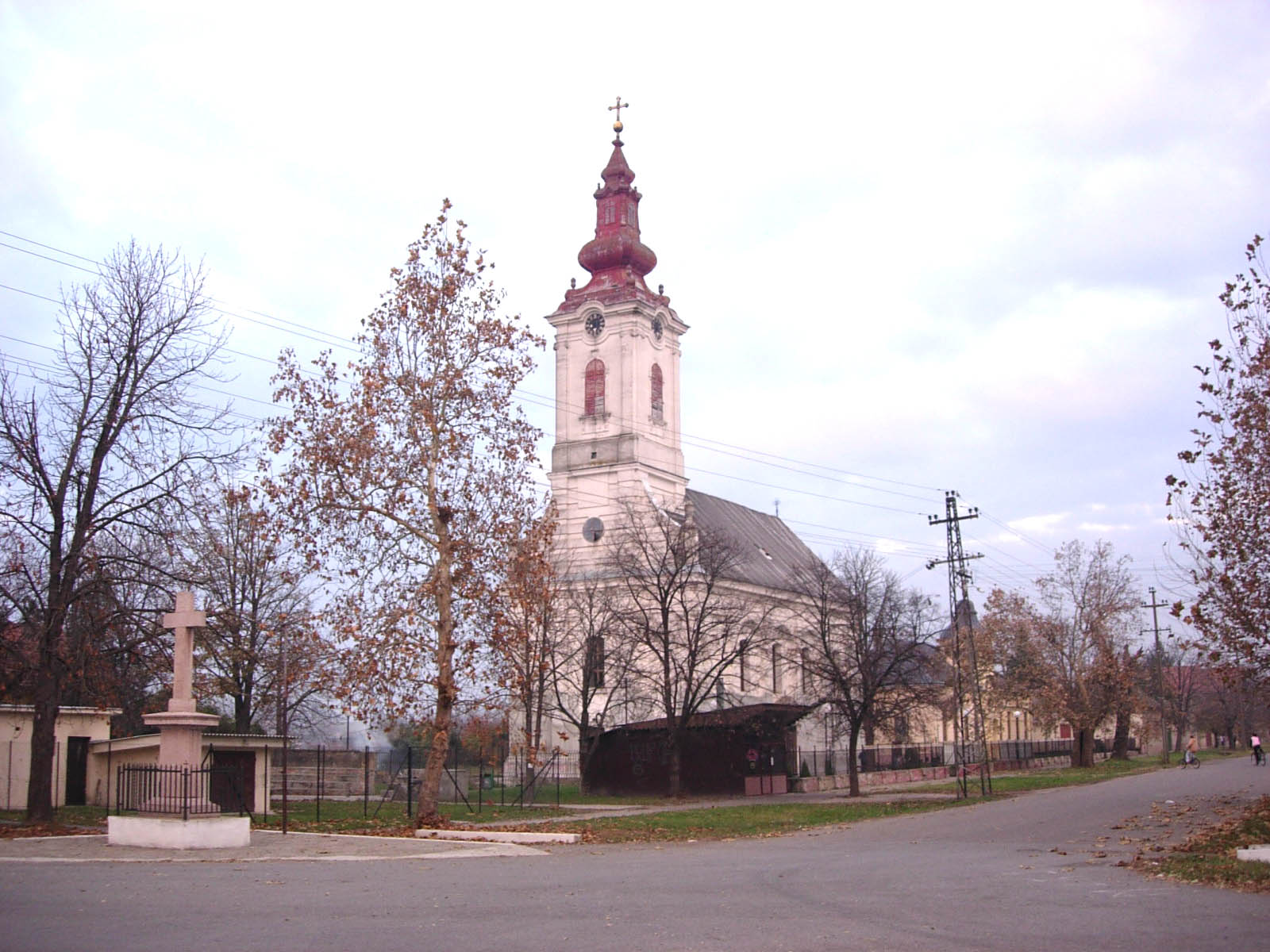
- The Orthodox church.

- Location within Vojvodina Location within Serbia Location within Europe
- Coordinates: 45°30′N 19°55′E
- Country: Serbia
- Province: Vojvodina
- Region: Bačka (Podunavlje)
- District: South Bačka
- Municipality: Srbobran

Population (2002)
  - Total: 2,202
- Time zone: UTC+1 (CET)
  - Summer (DST): UTC+2 (CEST)

Nadalj (Serbian Cyrillic: Надаљ) is a village located in the Srbobran municipality, in the South Bačka District of Serbia. It is situated in the Autonomous Province of Vojvodina. The village has a Serb ethnic majority and its population numbering 2,202 people (2002 census).

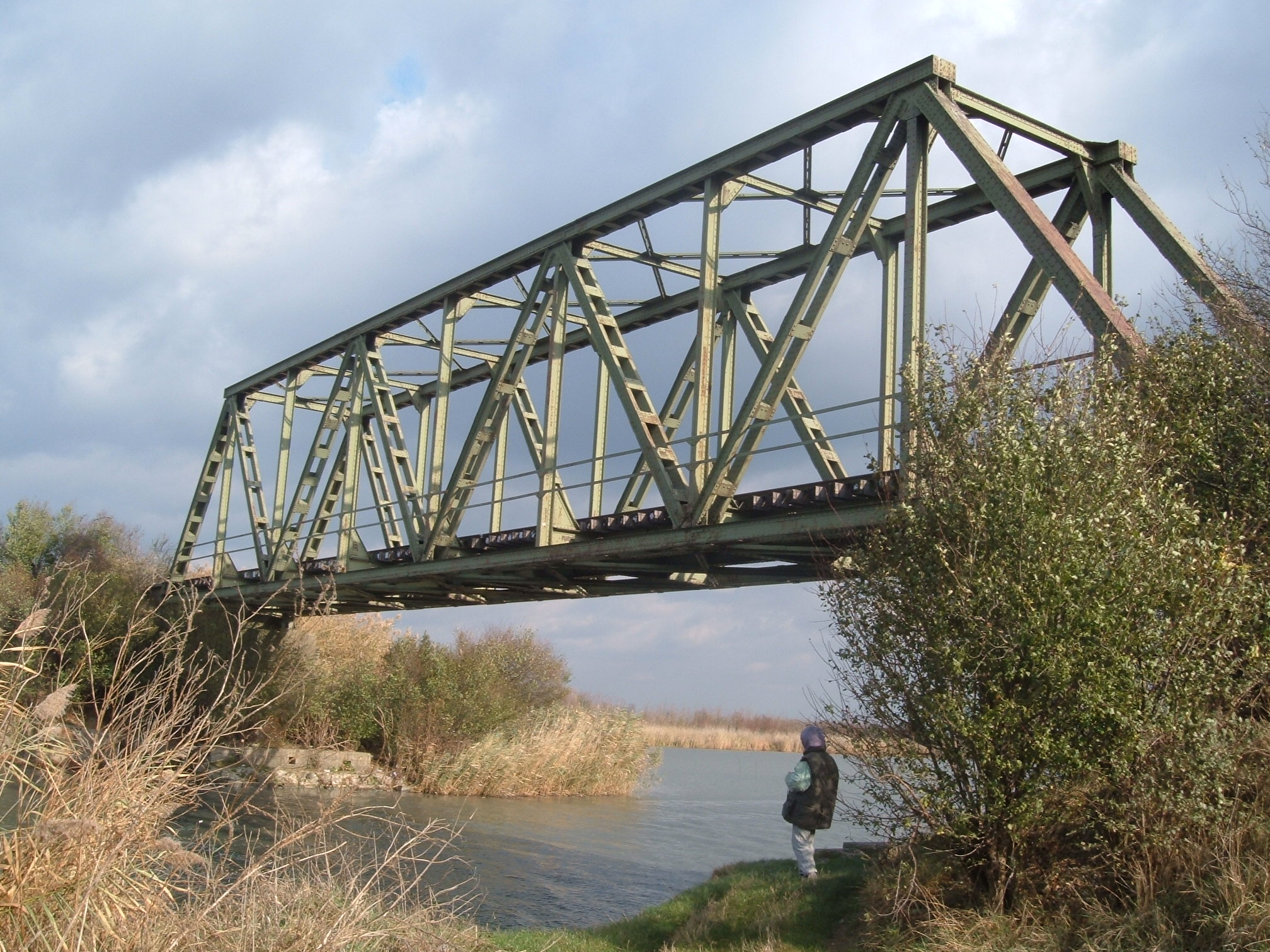
Old railway bridge across Great Bačka Canal near Nadalj

== Historical population ==
- 1961: 2,441
- 1971: 2,163
- 1981: 2,042
- 1991: 1,952

== Notable people ==
- Momčilo Tapavica, tennis player, weightlifter, wrestler and architect.

== See also ==
- List of places in Serbia
- List of cities, towns and villages in Vojvodina
