= Michel Macheboeuf =

Michel Macheboeuf (19 October 1900 – 20 August 1953) was a French physician scientist who served as a head of the biochemistry department of the Pasteur Institute and studied blood lipids. He has been called the father of plasma lipoproteins.

Macheboeuf was born in Châtel-Guyon, France, son of the physician Elie Macheboeuf. After studies at Clermont-Ferrand and Paris, he joined Gabriel Bertrand’s laboratory at the Pasteur Institute. He also studied with S.P.L. Sørensen in Copenhagen as a Rockefeller Fellow. Along with Bertrand, he found lipids in blood plasma and they found that they could be complexed with albumin (he called it as "cenapse"). The principle is still used in the lipid albumin index used in clinical studies, which is the amount of lipid that remains water-soluble after addition of albumin. Im 1929 he isolated lipoprotein by precipitating using a neutral 50% ammonium sulfate extract of serum and then lowering the pH to 3.8. Macheboeuf also studied tuberculosis and examined the effect of high pressure on bacteria and viruses. He married Simone Bezou and they had three daughters. He died from a lung infection.
