= Srbobran =

Srbobran Србобран (Serbian) Szenttamás (Hungarian) Sentomaš
- Town and municipality
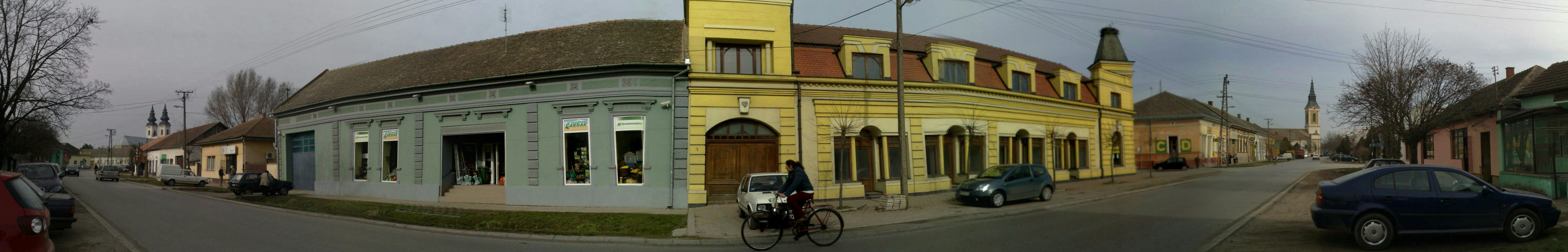
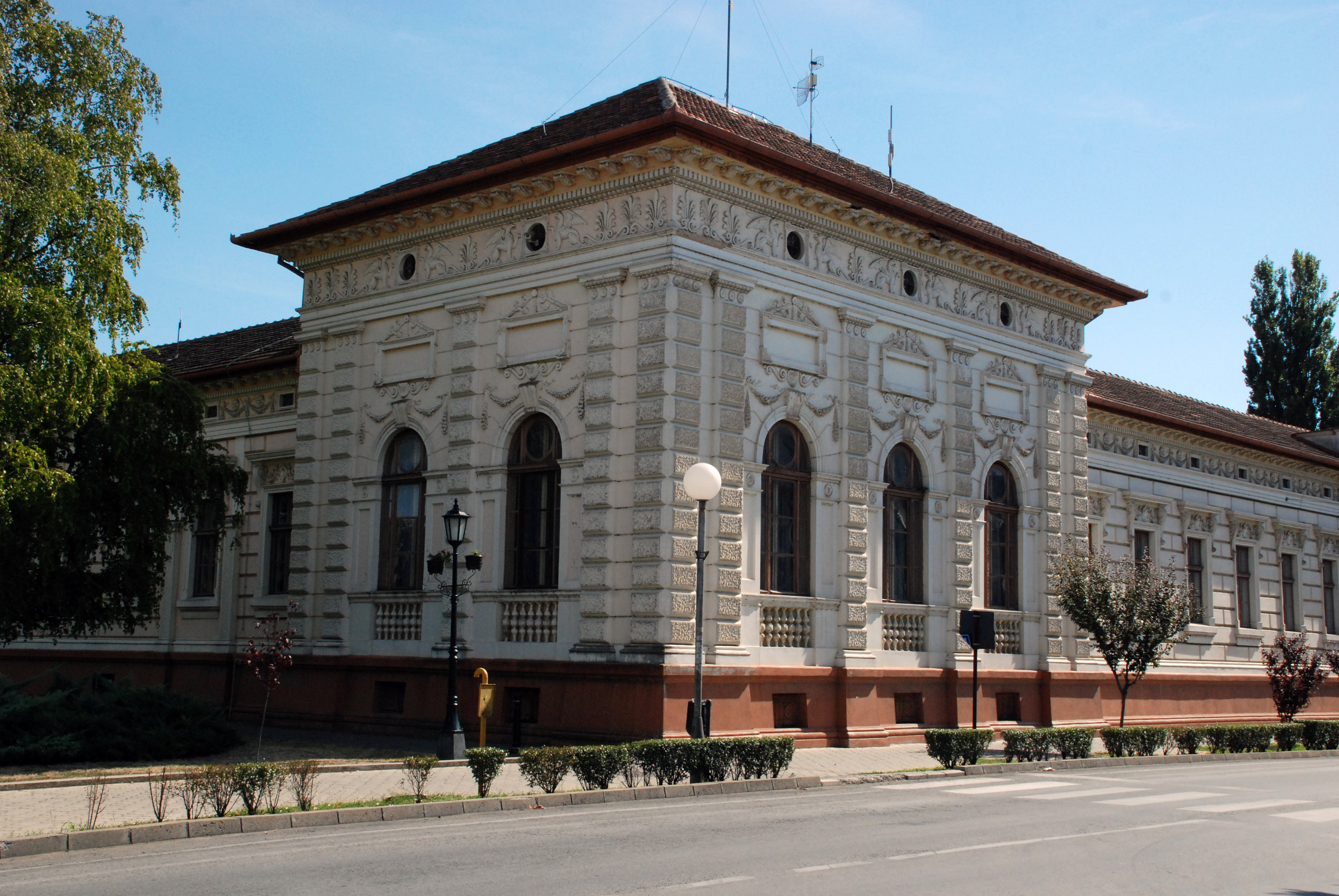
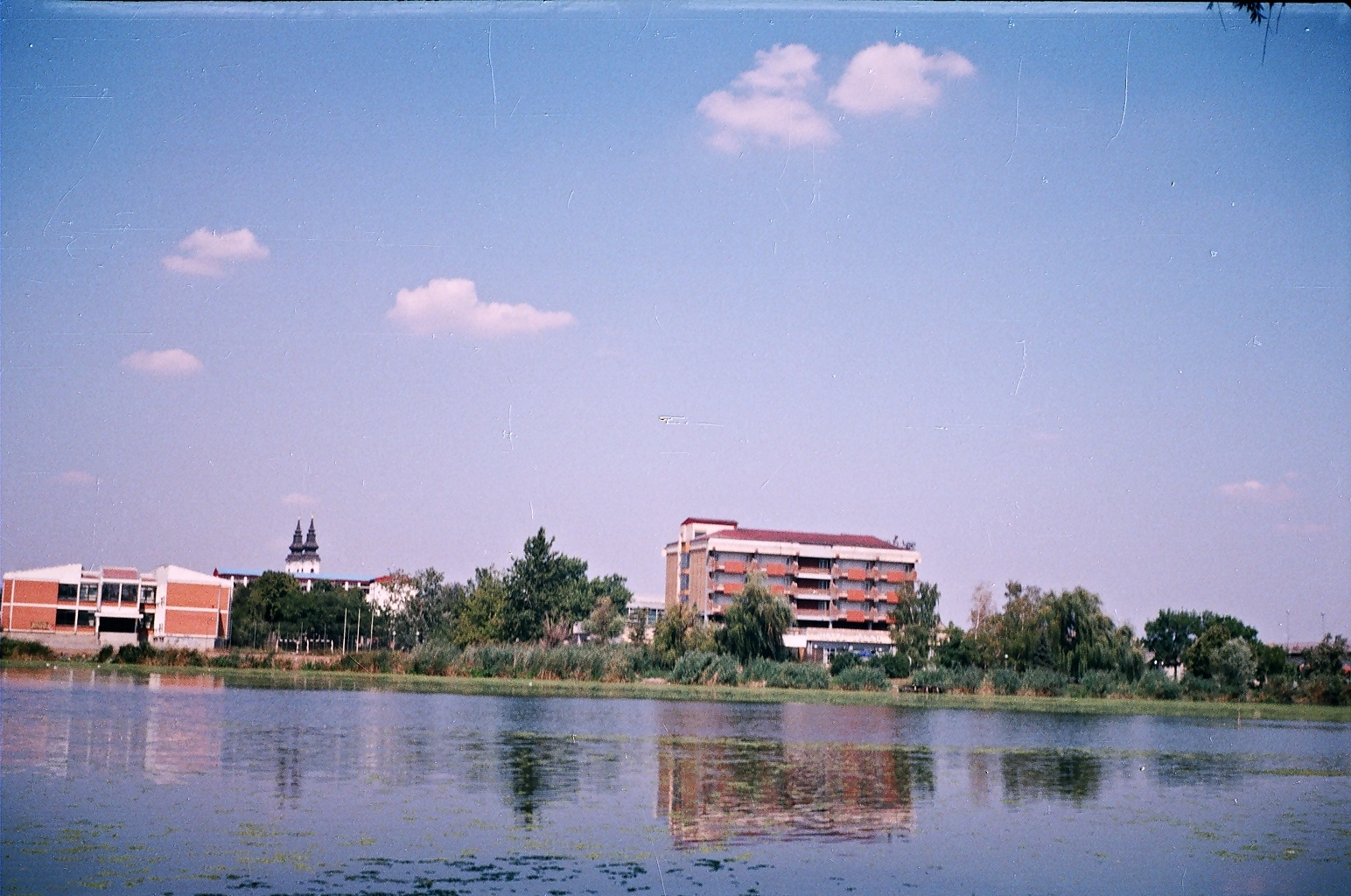
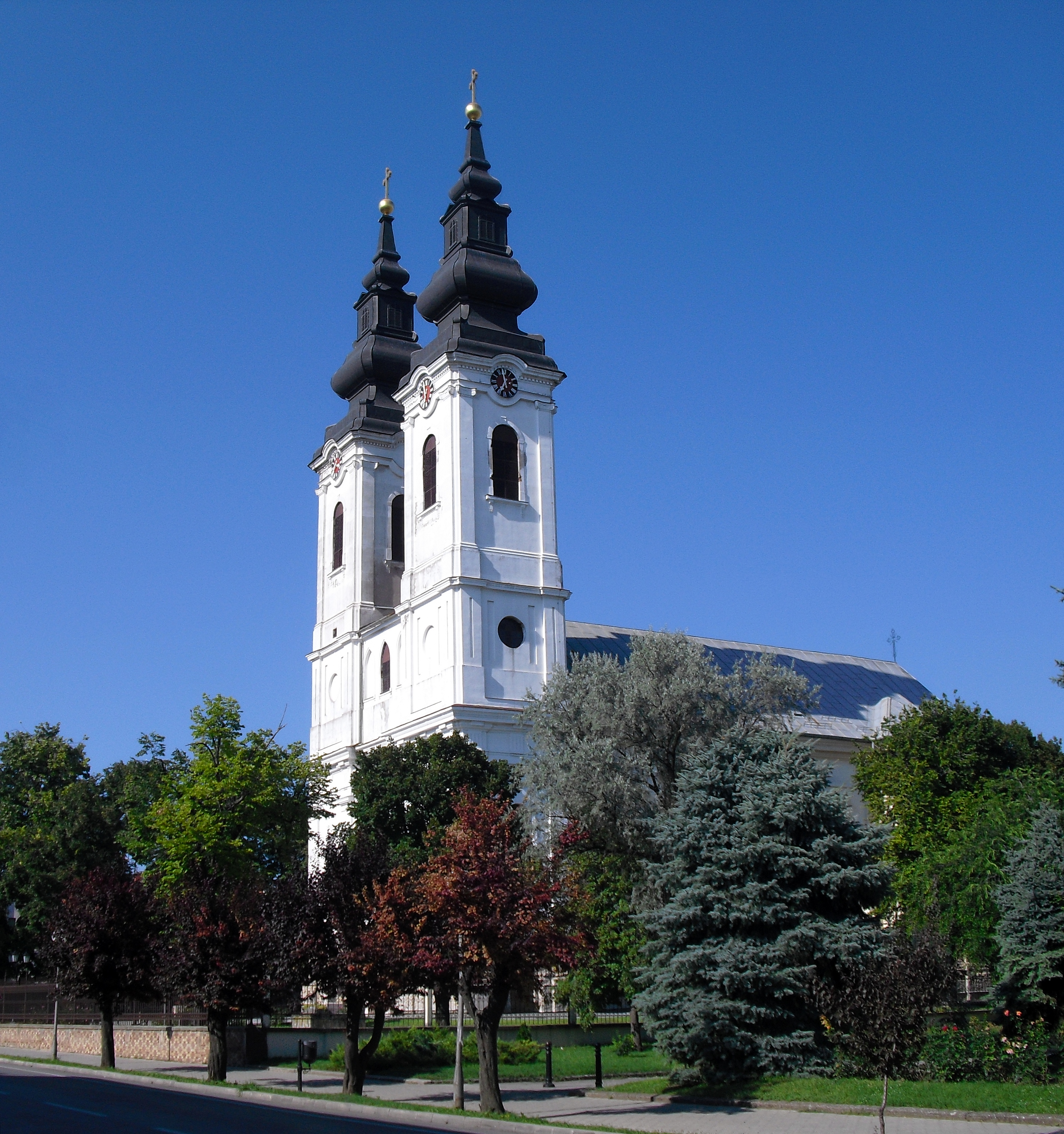
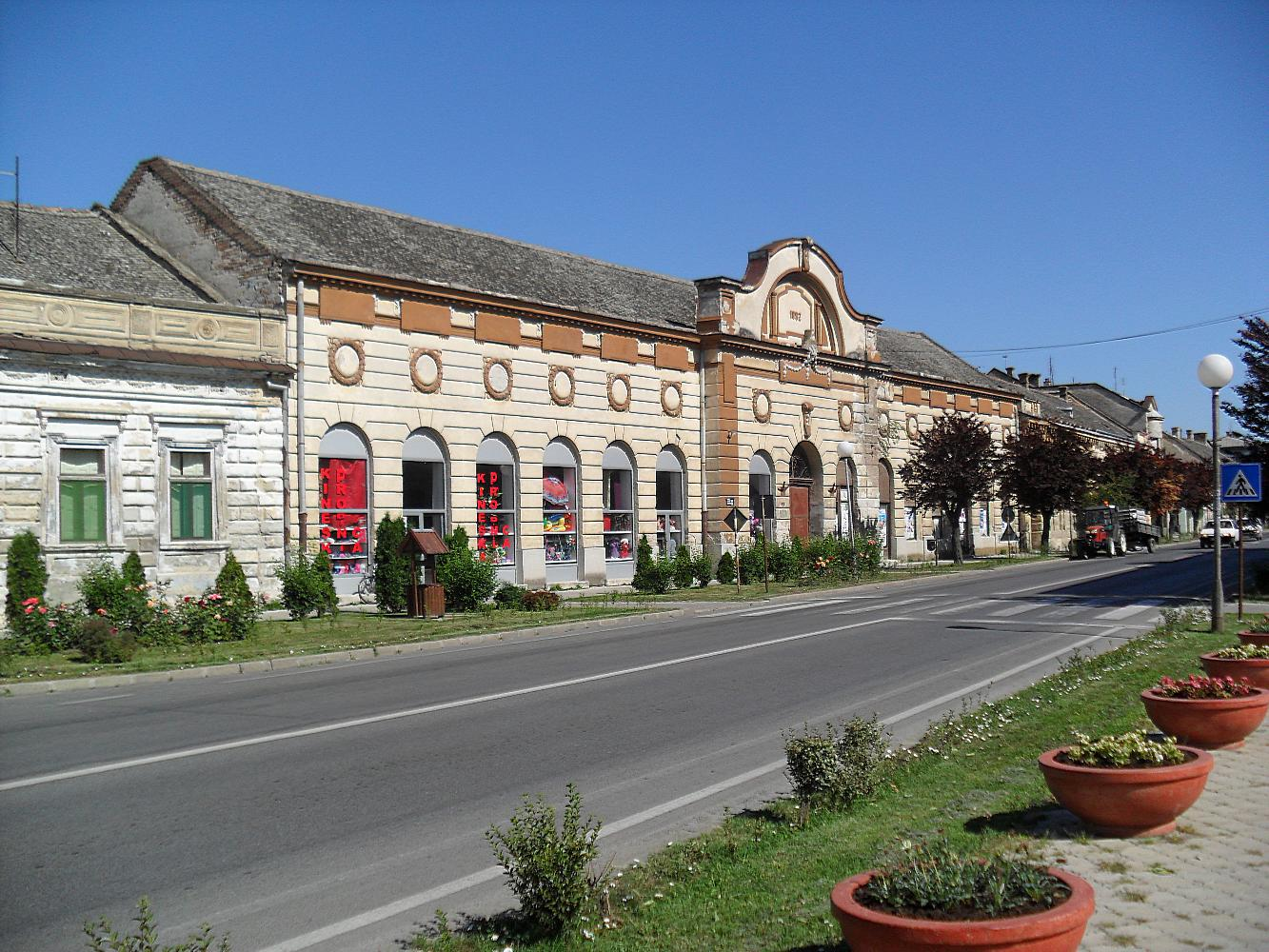
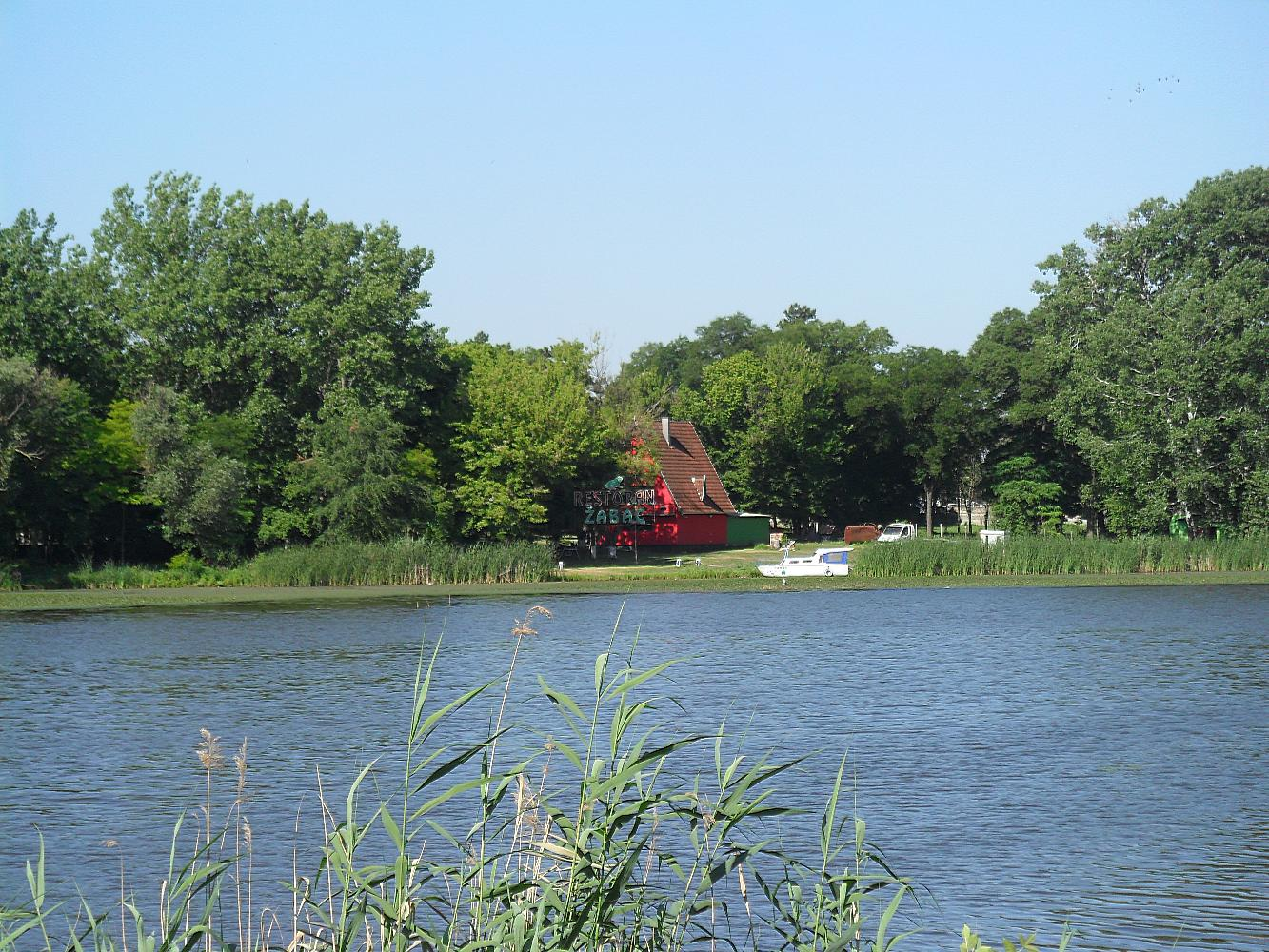
- Srbobran

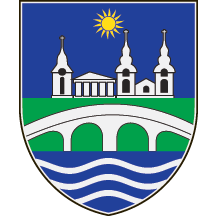
- Coat of arms

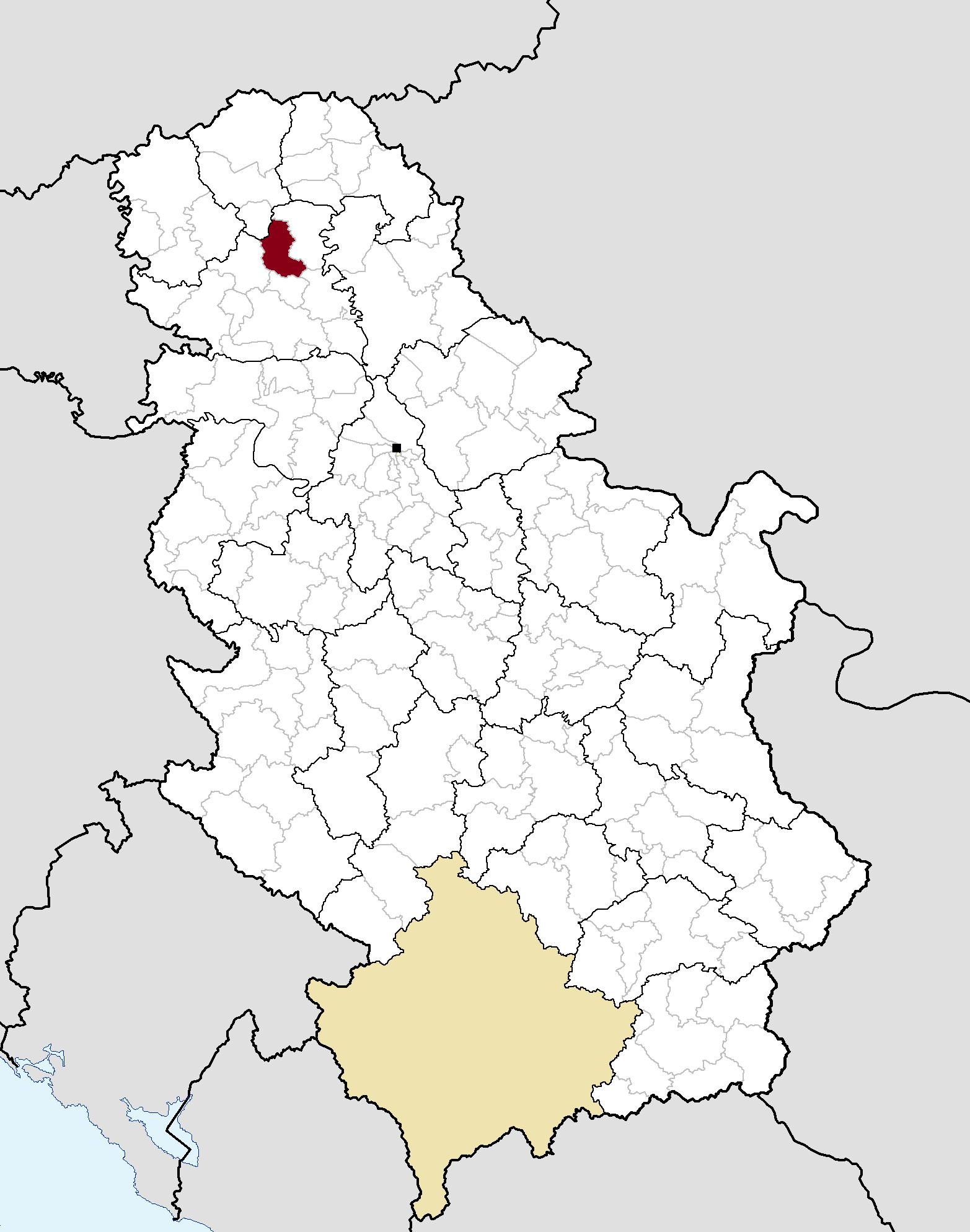
- Location of the municipality of Srbobran within Serbia
- Coordinates: 45°32′N 19°47′E
- Country: Serbia
- Province: Vojvodina
- District: South Bačka
- Settlements: 3

Government
  - Mayor: Radivoj Debeljački (SNS)

Area
  - Municipality: 284 km^{2} (110 sq mi)
- Elevation: 82 m (269 ft)

Population (2022 census)
  - Town: 10,496
  - Municipality: 14,357
- Time zone: UTC+1 (CET)
  - Summer (DST): UTC+2 (CEST)
- Postal code: 21480
- Area code: +381 21
- Car plates: NS
- Official languages: Serbian together with Hungarian

Srbobran (Serbian: Србобран, pronounced [sr̩̂bɔbraːn]; Hungarian: Szenttamás) is a town and municipality located in the South Bačka District of the autonomous province of Vojvodina, Serbia. The town is located on the north bank of the Danube-Tisa-Danube canal. The town has a population of 10,496, and the municipality of 14,357 according to 2022 census.

The municipality of Srbobran encompasses of town of Srbobran, and two villages: Nadalj and Turija.

== Name ==
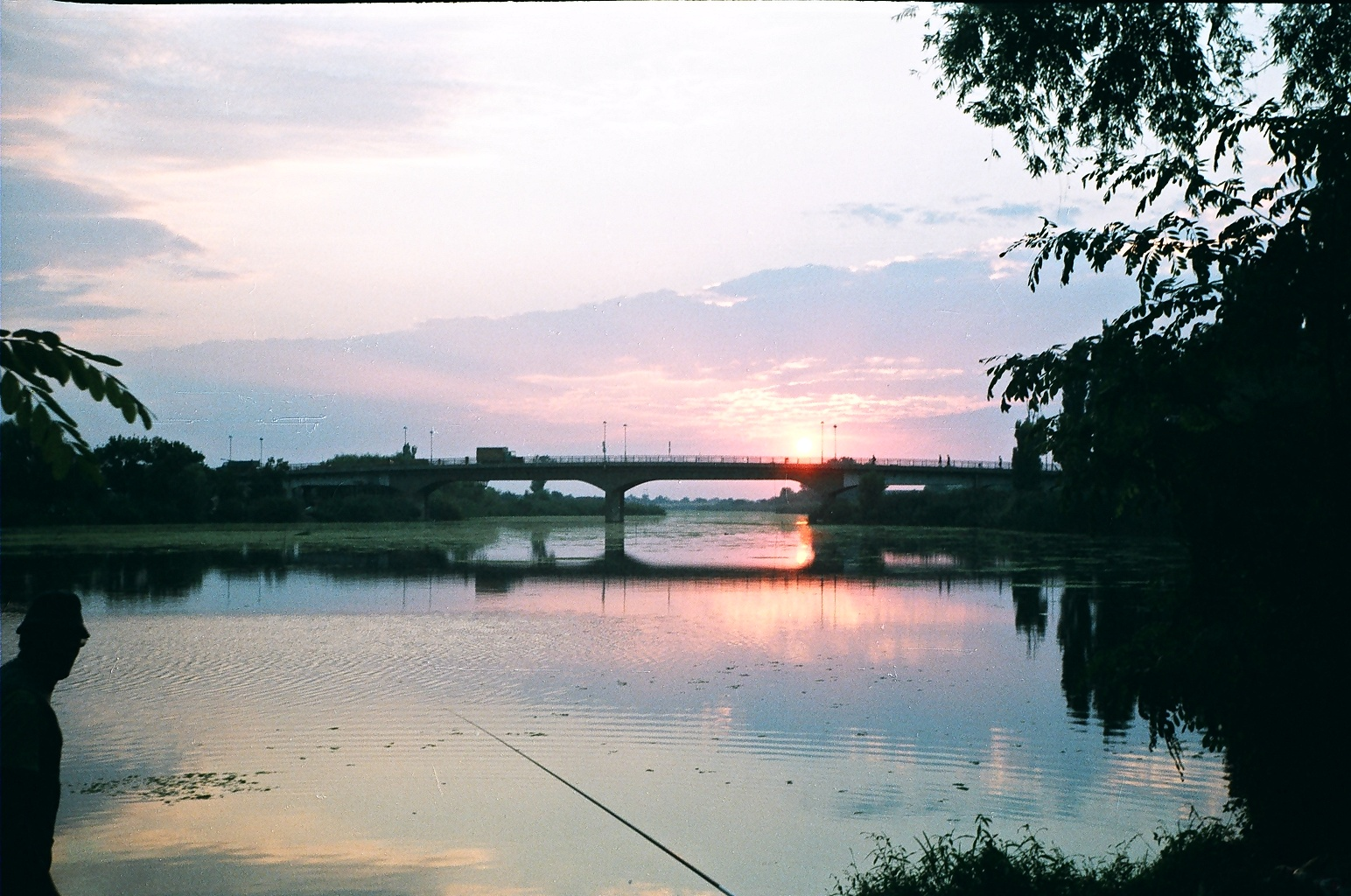
Bridge over the Danube–Tisa–Danube Canal in Srbobran

In Serbian, the town is known as Srbobran (Србобран); in Hungarian as Szenttamás (pronounced [ˈsɛntɒmaːʃ]) or Szrbobran (formerly also Bács-Szenttamás); in Rusyn (a Cyrillic-only language) as /Србобран/; in Slovak as Srbobran; and in German as Thomasberg or Sankt Thomas. The name Srbobran means Serb defender" in Serbian. Older Serbian name used for the town was Sentomaš (Сентомаш).

== History ==
Archaeological records indicate that there has been human settlement in the territory of present-day Srbobran since prehistoric times. The first written record of settlement is from 1338, in which Srbobran is mentioned under name Sentomas, which means Saint Thomas, i.e. the apostle Thomas, who was the patron saint of a monastery and of the village around it in the Middle Ages. During this time, the area was under administration of the medieval Kingdom of Hungary and was part of Bacsensis County. This village, together with the monastery, was destroyed during the Ottoman conquest in the 16th century. Its former population left the region and fled towards north to Habsburg Hungary. During the period of Ottoman administration, the settlement of Sentomaš was rebuilt and populated by ethnic Serbs. It was part of the Ottoman Sanjak of Segedin.

After the Bačka region was captured by Habsburg troops led by Prince Eugene of Savoy in the end of the 17th century, Sentomaš came under Habsburg rule and was populated by new colonists, mainly ethnic Serbs from the south, but also (since the second half of the 18th century) by ethnic Hungarians from the north, who became the second largest ethnic group in the settlement (after Serbs). The settlement was part of the Military Frontier until 1751, when it came under the civil administration. A document from 1751 indicates that besides the name Sentomaš, Srbograd ("Serb Town") was also used as an unofficial name for the town. The town grew quickly; in 1787 its population was 3,532, while in 1836 this number rose to 11,321. After 1751 the town was part of the Theiss district within Batsch-Bodrog County and the Habsburg Kingdom of Hungary.

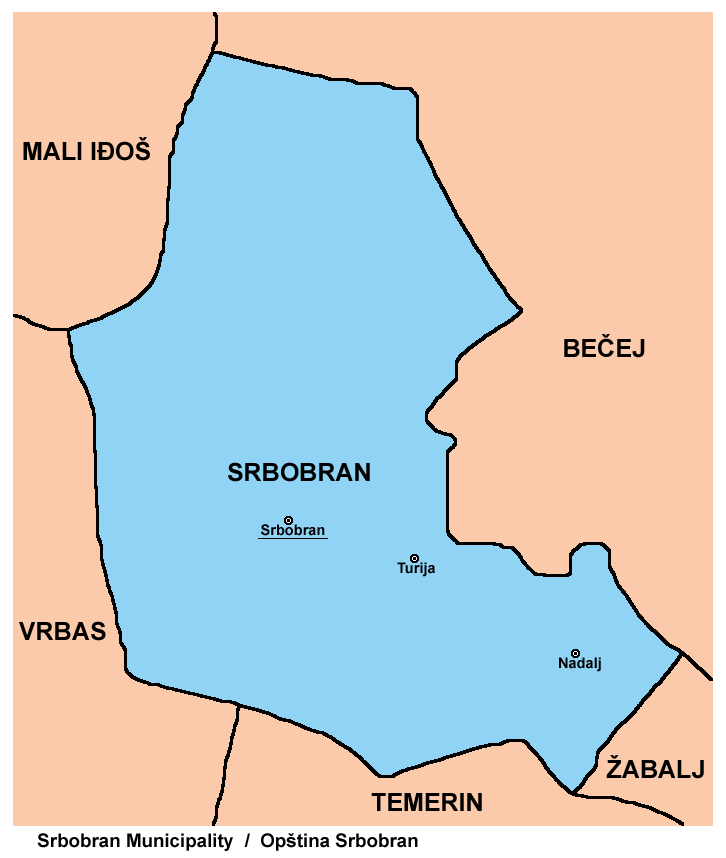
Map of Srbobran municipality

The name Srbobran dates from the time of the 1848/1849 revolutions in the Habsburg Monarchy, but has been officially used since 1918. In 1848–1849, the town was part of the Serbian Voivodship, a Serbian autonomous region within the Austrian Empire. The Serbian defense line was located near this town, hence the name Srbobran, which means "Serbs's defender". On July 14, 1848, the first siege of the town by Hungarian forces began under Baron Fülöp Berchtold who was forced to retreat due to a strong Serbian defense. The Hungarian troops captured Sentomaš on the fourth attempt, on April 4, 1849, and burned the town to the ground. Having suppressed the Hungarian anti-Habsburg movement (in 1849), Austrian authorities established a new province to which Sentomaš belonged to: the Voivodeship of Serbia and Banat of Temeschwar, which existed until 1860. In 1850, the population of Sentomaš was 5,630 people, which was only about half of the population recorded in 1836. After the abolishment of the voivodeship in 1860, Sentomaš was again a part of Batsch-Bodrog County. After the establishment of the dual Monarchy of Austria-Hungary in 1867, the town was located within the Hungarian part of the Monarchy. According to the official census of 1910, Sentomaš had 14,335 inhabitants; among them 7,808 (54.47%) spoke Serbian, 6,031 (42.07%) spoke Hungarian, and 430 (3%) spoke German.

Sentomaš became part of the Kingdom of Serbs, Croats and Slovenes (called Yugoslavia after 1929) in 1918 and was officially named Srbobran. In 1918–1919, the town was part of the Banat, Bačka and Baranja region and also (between 1918 and 1922) part of the Novi Sad County. Between 1922 and 1929 it was part of Belgrade Oblast, and between 1929 and 1941 part of Danube Banovina. In 1941, the town was occupied by the Axis powers and was attached to Miklós Horthy's Hungary. In 1944, the Soviet Red Army and Yugoslav partisans expelled Axis troops from the region, at this time approximately 2000 civil people with Hungarian nationality was killed by revenge. Srbobran was included into the autonomous province of Vojvodina within new socialist Yugoslavia. After 1945 Vojvodina was part of the People's Republic of Serbia within Yugoslavia. Until the 1950s, Srbobran was part of the Bečej municipality, but then the separate municipality of Srbobran was established. During the Yugoslav wars of the 1990s, some Serb refugees came from Croatia, Bosnia and Herzegovina, and Kosovo, and settled in Srbobran.

== Demographics ==
=== Ethnic groups in the municipality ===
According to the 2011 census, the population of the Srbobran municipality was composed of:

- Serbs = 10,703 (65.63%)
- Hungarians = 3,387 (20.76%)
- Romani = 629 (3.85%)
- Others and undeclared = 1,598 (9.79%)

All of the three settlements in the municipality have an ethnic Serb majority. The Serbian and Hungarian language are officially used by municipal authorities.

Also see: Serbs in Vojvodina, Hungarians in Vojvodina, Romani people of Vojvodina.

=== Ethnic groups in the town ===
In 2011, Srbobran town had a population of 12,009, including:

- Serbs = 7,093 (59.06%)
- Hungarians = 3,220 (26.81%)
- Roma = 465 (3.87%)
- Others and undeclared = 1,231 (10.25%)

=== Historical population of the town ===
- 1961: 14,391
- 1971: 14,189
- 1981: 13,596
- 1991: 12,798
- 2011: 11,968
- 2022: 10,496

== Economy ==
The following table gives a preview of total number of employed people per their core activity (as of 2017):

Activity	Total
Agriculture, forestry and fishing	427
Mining	18
Processing industry	459
Distribution of power, gas and water	61
Distribution of water and water waste management	48
Construction	106
Wholesale and retail, repair	465
Traffic, storage and communication	135
Hotels and restaurants	77
Media and telecommunications	12
Finance and insurance	20
Property stock and charter	2
Professional, scientific, innovative and technical activities	89
Administrative and other services	43
Administration and social assurance	176
Education	190
Healthcare and social work	176
Art, leisure and recreation	23
Other services	77
Total	2,604

== Transport ==
Town is located near to the M22 motorway between Belgrade and Subotica. There are two national highways that run through the town, highways 3 and 22. These three important routes make the town an important transport link.

Highway 3 runs west to Sombor, and east to Bečej. Highway 22 runs to Budapest in Hungary to the north changing to Highway 5 in Hungary, and to Ribarice, in the south of Serbia.

== Architecture ==
There are two notable buildings in Srbobran, both of which are churches (one is Serb Orthodox, the other one is Roman Catholic) and both are built in highly sophisticated late baroque style.

== Famous citizens ==
- Members of the wealthy Dunđerski family were buried in the town's cemetery, including the famous beauty Lenka Dunđerski, who was a tragic love of poet Laza Kostić, and Teodora Dunđerski, a courtier.
- Srbobran is the birthplace of Nándor Gion (1941–2002), one of the best-known Hungarian writers, who was born and mostly lived in the region of Vojvodina. In his books he describes, first of all, his home-town, "Szenttamás", during the tragic years of the world wars.
  - Đorđe Dunđerski, Yugoslavian tennis player
- Ognjen Mudrinski, football player
- Aleksandar Katai, footballer, member of the Serbia national football team
- Stefan Bukinac, footballer, member of the Serbia U19 national football team

== Gallery ==
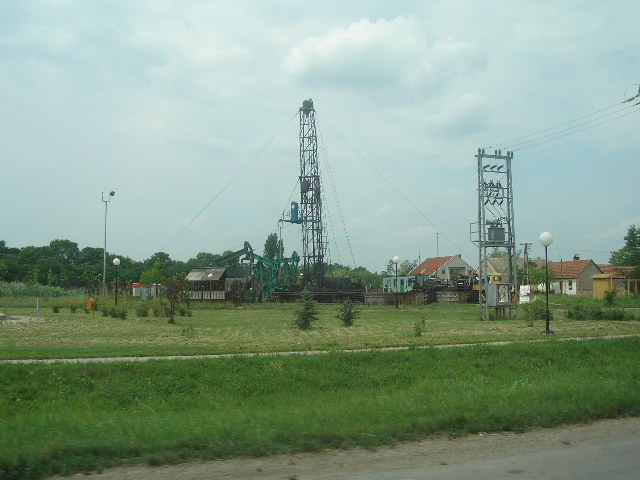
Oil drilling facilities near Srbobran

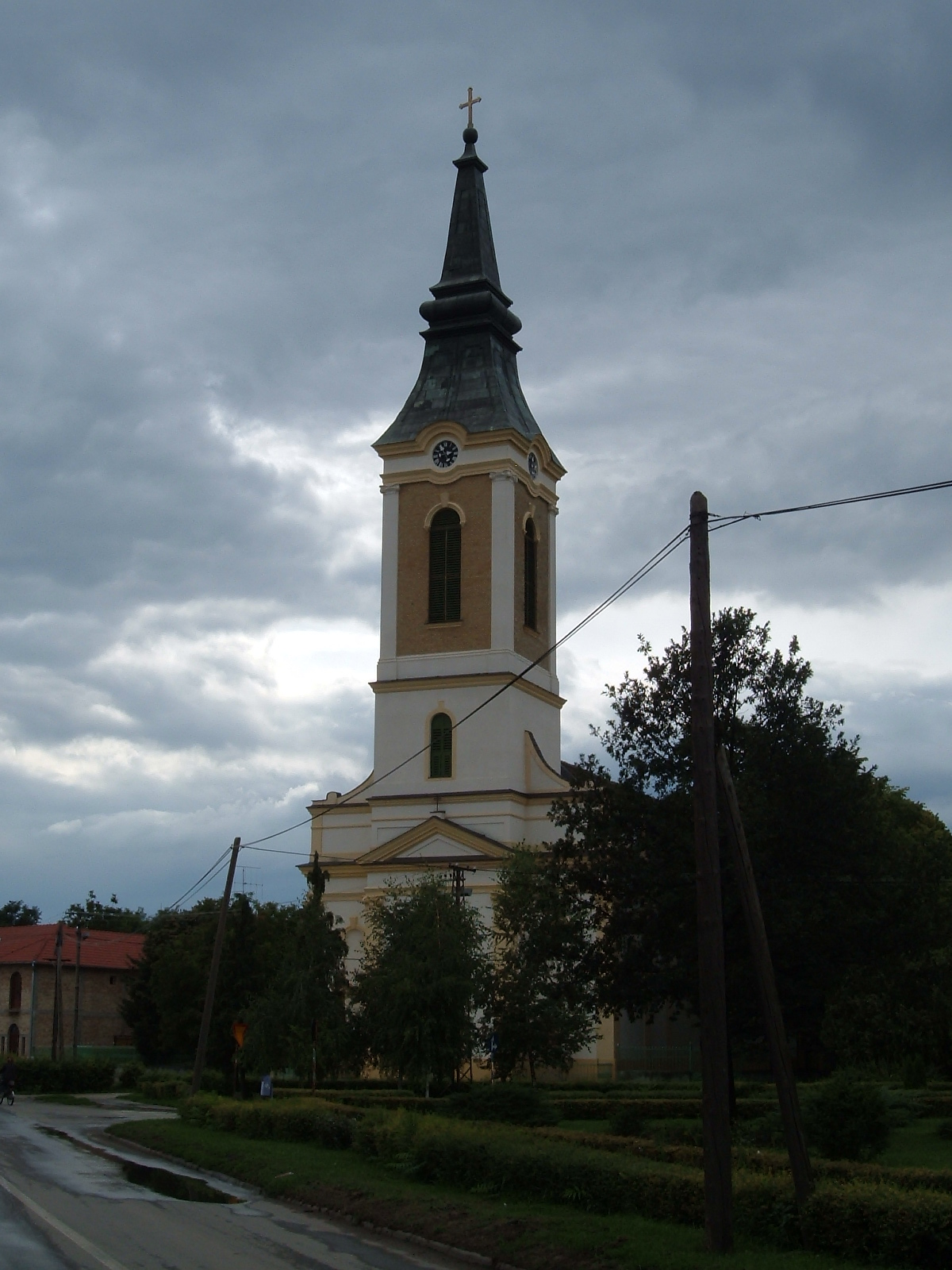
Catholic Church

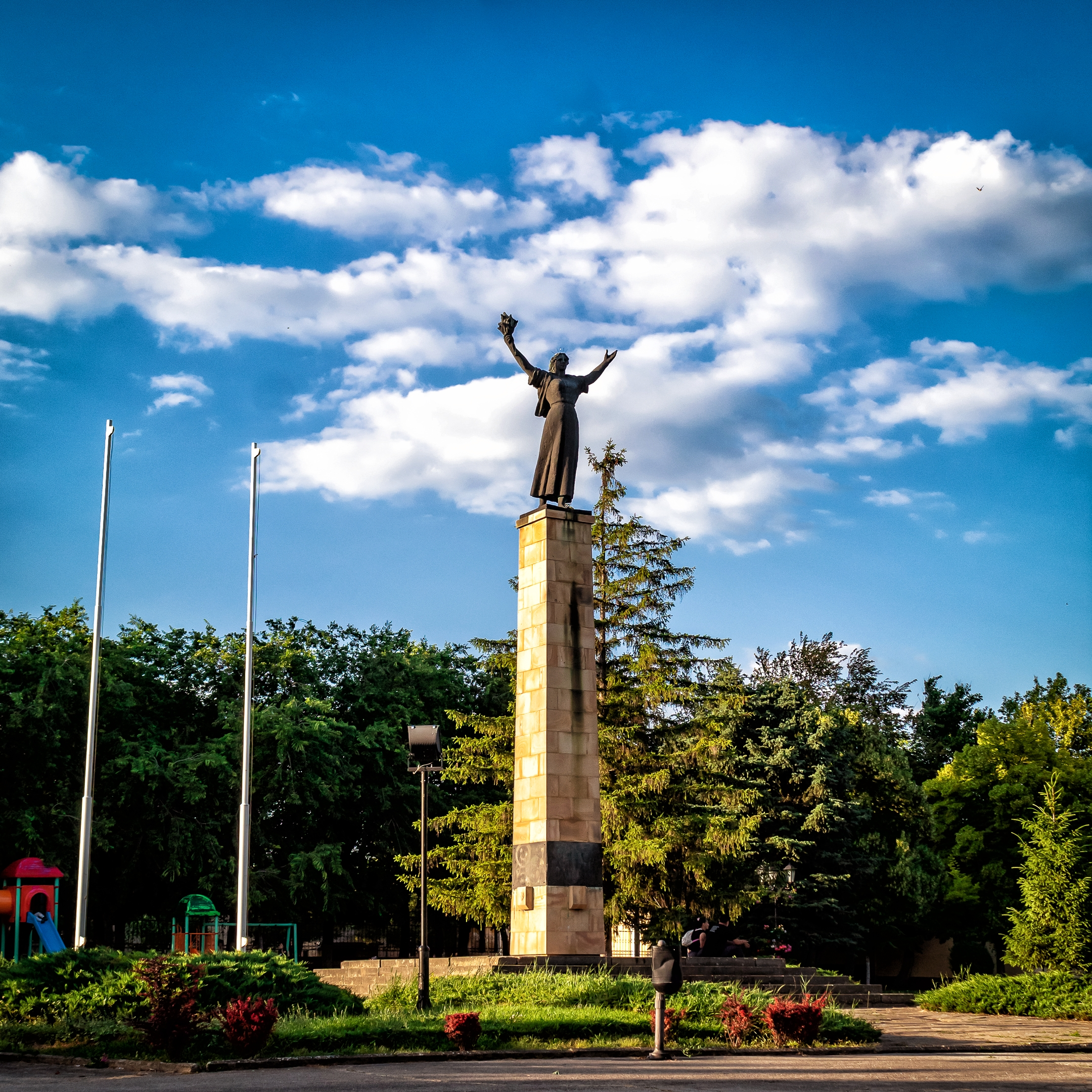
Monument Sloboda (Liberty) in central park of Srbobran

== See also ==
- List of places in Serbia
- List of cities, towns and villages in Vojvodina
- Municipalities of Serbia
- South Bačka District

== Notes and references ==
Notes

- Slobodan Ćurčić, Broj stanovnika Vojvodine, Novi Sad, 1996.
- Slobodan Ćurčić, Naselja Bačke - geografske karakteristike, Novi Sad, 2007.
