= Jegrička =

River in Serbia

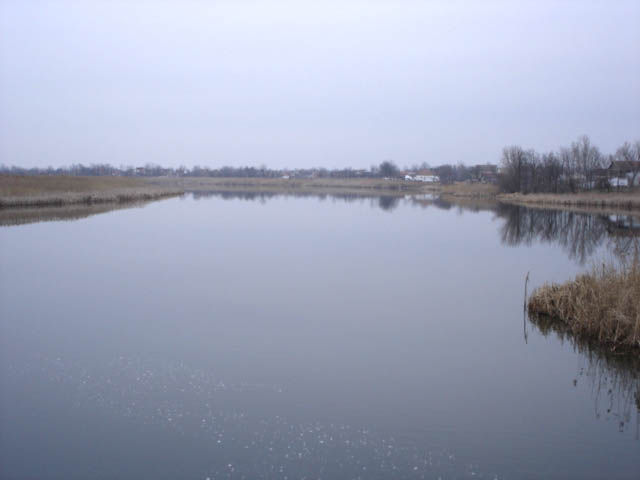
- The Jegrička near Žabalj

- Location of the mouth in Serbia
- Native name: Јегричка (Serbian)

Location
- Country: Serbia

Physical characteristics
- Source
  - location: Bačka region, south of the Pivnice village, Vojvodina, Serbia
  - elevation: 76 m (249 ft)
- Mouth
  - location: Tisa river, west of Zrenjanin, Vojvodina, Serbia
  - coordinates: 45.3882°N 20.2015°E
- Length: 65 km (40 mi)

Basin features
- Progression: Tisza→ Danube→ Black Sea

The Jegrička (Serbian Cyrillic: Јегричка; Hungarian: Egres; German: Egresch) is a river in northern Serbia, in the Bačka region of the Vojvodina province, a 65-kilometre-long (40-mile) right tributary to the Tisa river.

== Geography ==
The Jegrička is samica ("lone river"), or the river that has no spring as such, but it forms from several natural draining canals from the marshes. It originates south of the Pivnice village, in the central Bačka. The river flows in the eastern direction whole of its course. It passes next to the villages of Despotovo, Ravno Selo, Zmajevo and Sirig, parallel to the Canal Danube-Tisa-Danube and Mali Kanal. Near the town of Temerin, the Jegrička forms an arc to the north, flows next to the Gospođinci village and into the marshes of Žabalj to the south, where its waters are used for the Jegrička fish pond, with an area of 0.98 km^{2} (0.38 sq mi). The river continues eastward, on the northern side of the Jurišna humka hillock (88 m (289 ft)) and empties into the Tisa.

The Jegrička used to be a slow, intermittent water flow, connecting a series of marshes and bogs which in the periods of high waters spilled over and flew like a real river, reaching the Tisa. Today, the complete first section of the river bed (35 km (22 mi)) is channelled. In the next 20 km (12 mi) the river is preserved in its natural shape while the last 15 km (9.3 mi) are used for fish ponds. The reason why the river is so slow and lazy is because of its extremely small inclination in its watershed, only 3 m (9.8 ft) over the course of 65 km (40 mi) (the river springs out at an altitude of 76 m (249 ft) and empties on 73 m (240 ft)).

== Protection ==
In 2003 the river was placed under the preliminary environmental protection, and the Jegrička Nature Park was established in 2005. In the late 2000s the sections of the river which flow through the settlements, like Ravno Selo and Zmajevo, were dredged and cleaned from silt, while the banks were adapted into the esplanades with the benches, gazebos and tables. But by 2011 the river was clogged with the garbage again. The water in the park is threatened by the domestic waste, sewage water, cutting and burning of the reed, drainage of the pesticides from the surrounding fields and poaching.

The river is known for the large carpets of white water lilies. Other species include marsh fern and greater bladderwort. The river is rich in different fish species, amphibians, reptiles and mammals. It host different species of water fowl and is home to the endangered Ferruginous duck. The river is rich in common carp, northern pike, wels catfish and zander and a section of the river is transformed into the Jegrička fish pond. The section of the park is declared an important bird area.

== Sources ==
- Jovan Đ. Marković (1990): Enciklopedijski geografski leksikon Jugoslavije; Svjetlost-Sarajevo; ISBN 86-01-02651-6
- Decision of the preliminary protection of the natural property Jegrička, Institute for natural protection, 17 December 2003
