= Jegrička Nature Park =

Nature park in Serbia

Coordinates: 45.395°N 20.110°E

- IUCN category V (protected landscape/seascape)
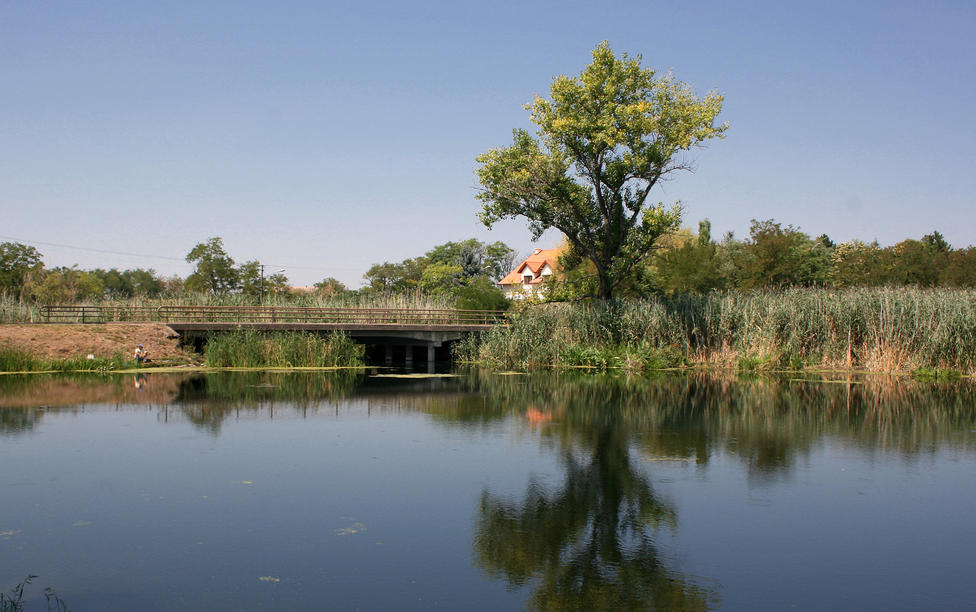
- Jegrička Nature Park
- Interactive map of Jegrička Nature Park
- Area: 11.44 km^{2} (4.42 sq mi)

The Jegrička Nature Park (Serbian: Парк природе Јегричка / Park prirode Jegrička) is a nature park in the north of Serbia along the Jegrička river the Bačka region of the Vojvodina province. The river is often lyrically referred to as "the umbilical cord of the Bačka wetlands" and is therefore declared a nature park. It covers the area along the river's banks and runs through four municipalities: Bačka Palanka, Vrbas, Temerin and Žabalj.

In the late 2000s the sections of the river which flow through the settlements, like Ravno Selo and Zmajevo, were dredged and cleaned from silt, while the banks were adapted into the esplanades with the benches, gazebos and tables. But by 2011 the river was clogged with the garbage again. The water in the park is threatened by the domestic waste, sewage water, cutting and burning of the reed, drainage of the pesticides from the surrounding fields and poaching.

== Flora ==
The nature park is renowned for having large carpets of white water lilies. Other species include marsh fern and greater bladderwort.

== Fauna ==
The river is rich in different fish species, amphibians, reptiles and mammals. It host different species of water fowl and is home to the endangered Ferruginous duck. The river is rich in common carp, northern pike, wels catfish and zander and a section of the river is transformed into the Jegrička fish pond. The section of the park is declared an important bird area.
