= Sonja Todorović =

Serbian politician

Sonja Todorović (Serbian Cyrillic: Соња Тодоровић; born 6 July 1976) is a politician in Serbia. She has served in the local government of Temerin and was elected to the National Assembly of Serbia in the 2020 parliamentary election. Todorović is a member of the Serbian Progressive Party.

== Early life and career ==
Todorović has a bachelor's degree (2002) and a master's degree (2011) in agricultural sciences from the University of Novi Sad Faculty of Agriculture. She lives in Temerin, in the province of Vojvodina.

== Politician ==
=== Municipal politics ===
Todorović first served on the Temerin municipal council (i.e., the executive branch of the municipal government) with responsibility for agriculture from 2004 to 2008. She appears to have been a non-party representative in government during this time.

She was subsequently elected to the Temerin municipal assembly in the 2012 Serbian local elections; she received the third position on the Progressive Party's electoral list and was elected when the list won five mandates out of thirty-three. This election produced an extremely divided assembly; no other list won more than four mandates, and the Progressives ultimately became a part of a local coalition government. Todorović was re-appointed to the municipal council in October 2014 with responsibility for ecology. In March 2015, she was appointed to a second term in the agriculture portfolio.

She was again given the third position on the Progressive list in the 2016 Serbian local elections and was elected when the list won a majority victory with seventeen mandates. After the election, she was again appointed to council with responsibility for agriculture. In November 2016, she was given additional responsibilities as assistant mayor. She was not a candidate for re-election at the local level in 2020.

=== Parliamentarian ===
Todorović received the 213th position on the Progressive Party's Aleksandar Vučić — Future We Believe In list in the 2014 Serbian parliamentary election. This was too low a position for election to be a realistic prospect, and she was not elected even as the list won a majority victory with 158 out of 250 mandates.

She was given the 138th position on the party's Aleksandar Vučić — For Our Children list in the 2020 Serbian parliamentary election and was elected to the assembly when the list won a landslide majority with 188 mandates. She is now a member of the agriculture, forestry, and water management committee; a deputy member of the health and family committee and the environmental protection committee; and a member of the parliamentary friendship groups with Brazil, China, Chile, Cuba, Cyprus, Israel, Mexico, Morocco, the Philippines, Portugal, Russia, and Tunisia.
