= Kamendin, Sirig =

Kamendin Камендин (Serbian)
- Interactive map of Kamendin
- Country: Serbia
- District: South Bačka District
- Time zone: UTC+1 (CET)
  - Summer (DST): UTC+2 (CEST)

Kamendin (Serbian Cyrillic: Камендин) is part of the village of Sirig, Serbia. It is located in the Temerin municipality, South Bačka District, Vojvodina province.

== History ==
In the 16th century, Kamendin was a separate settlement and according to the 1590 data, its population numbered 13 Serb houses.

== See also ==
- Sirig
- Temerin
