= Sirig =

Sirig Сириг (Serbian)
- Village (Selo)
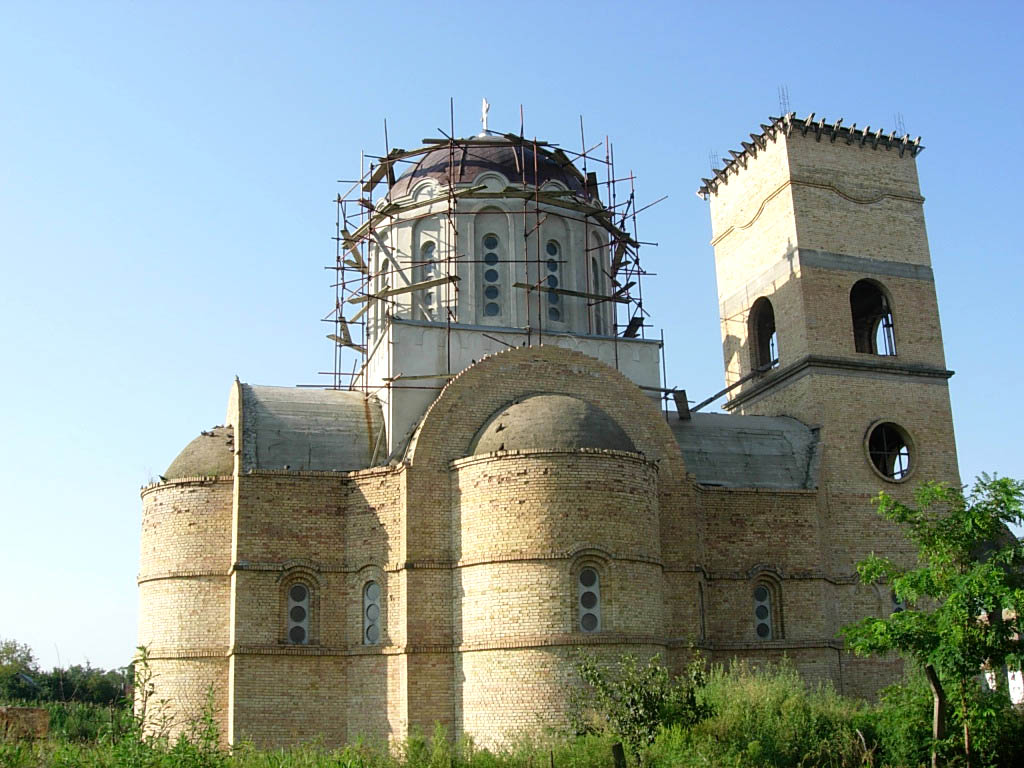
- The Orthodox church under construction

- Location within Vojvodina Location within Serbia Location within Europe
- Country: Serbia
- Province / Region: Vojvodina
- District: South Bačka District
- Municipality or city: Temerin

Population (2002)
  - Total: 3,010

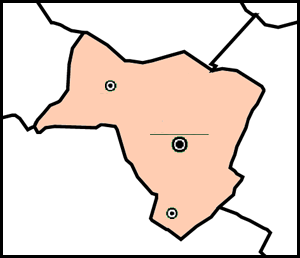

Sirig (Serbian Cyrillic: Сириг) is a village located in the Temerin municipality, in the South Bačka District of Serbia. It is situated in the Autonomous Province of Vojvodina. The village has a Serb ethnic majority and its population numbering 3,010 people (2002 census).

== Historical population ==
- 1961: 2,269
- 1971: 2,201
- 1981: 2,286
- 1991: 2,542
- 2002: 3,010
- 2020: 3700

== See also ==
- Kamendin, Sirig
- List of places in Serbia
- List of cities, towns and villages in Vojvodina
