= Pivnice (Bačka Palanka) =

Pivnice Пивнице (Serbian) Pivnica (Slovak)
- Village (Selo)
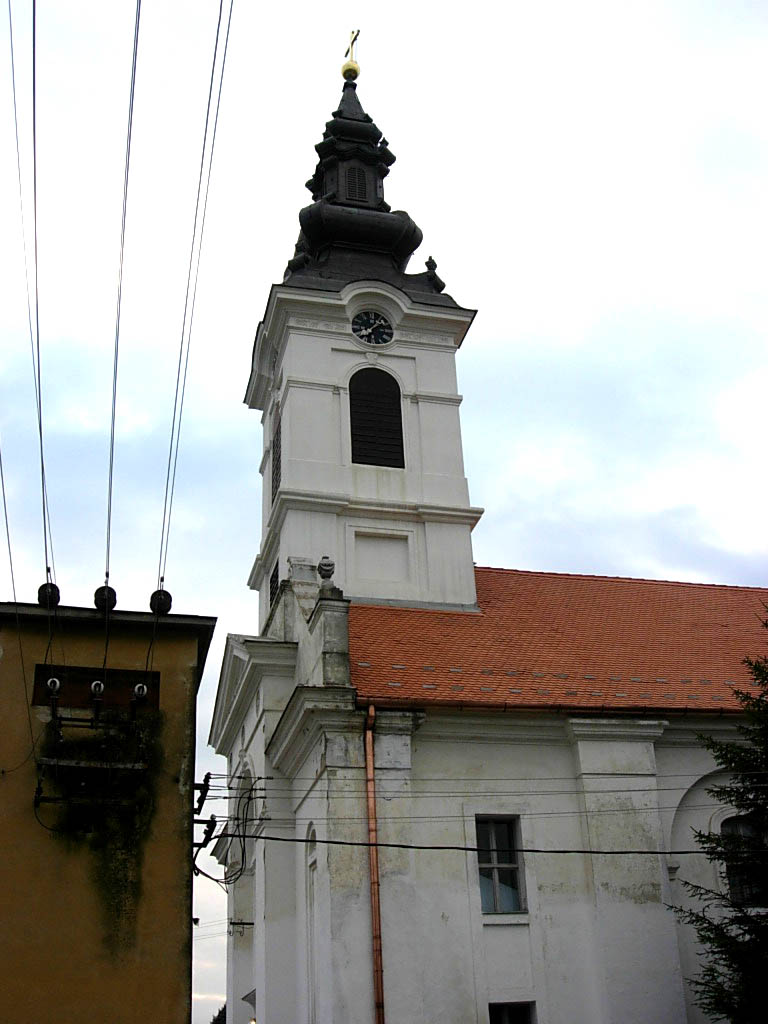
- The Evangelical Church

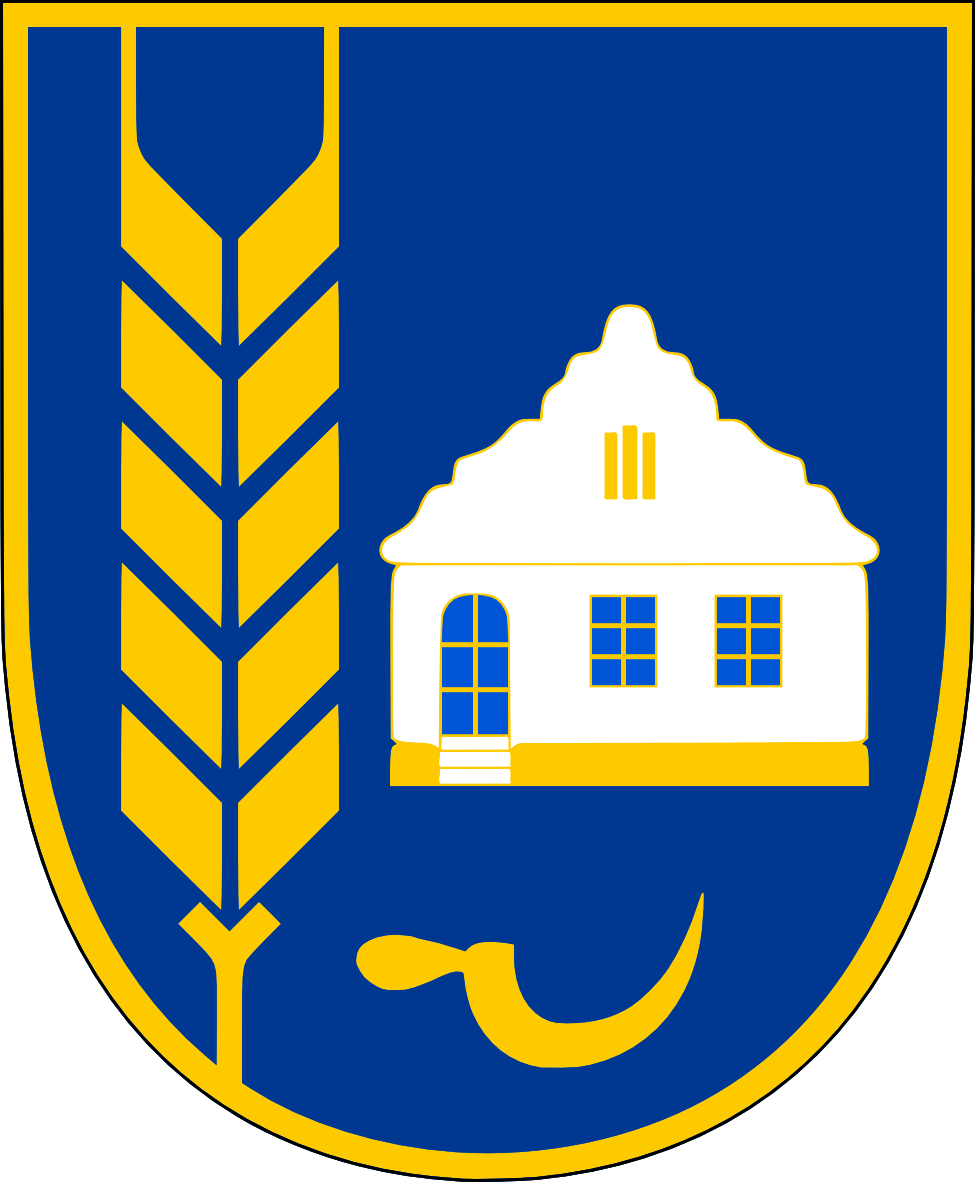
- Seal

- Location within Vojvodina Location within Serbia
- Coordinates: 45°28′N 19°27′E
- Country: Serbia
- Province: Vojvodina

Population (2022)
  - Total: 2,812
- Time zone: UTC+1 (CET)
  - Summer (DST): UTC+2 (CEST)

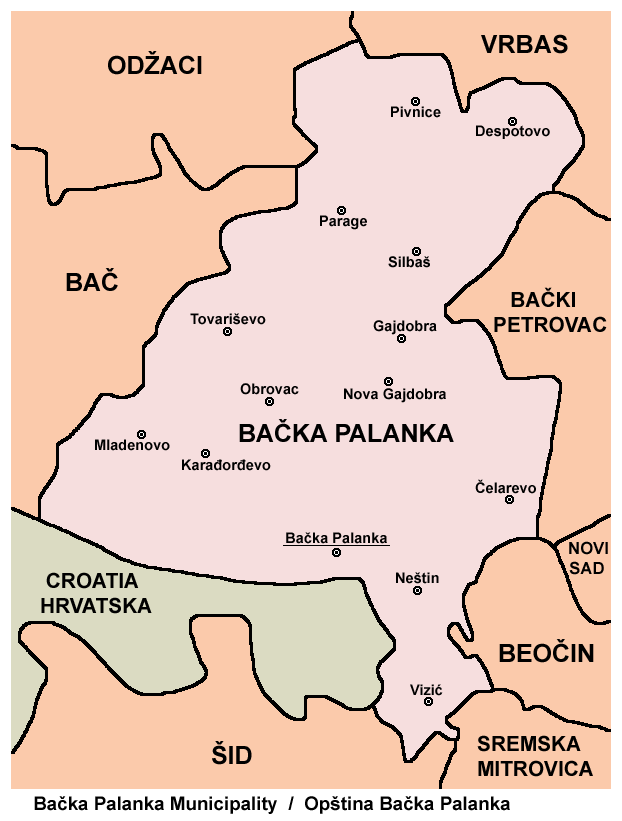
Map of the Bačka Palanka municipality, showing the location of Pivnice

Pivnice (Serbian Cyrillic: Пивнице; Slovak: Pivnica; Pannonian Rusyn: Пиньвиц) is a village located in the Bačka Palanka municipality, South Bačka District, Vojvodina, Serbia. The population of the village is 2,812 people (2022 census).

== Name ==
The name of the settlement in Serbian is plural, and singular in Slovak. In Pannonian Rusyn, the name of the village is at present an indeclinable masculine singular noun, but it may historically have been the genitive plural form of пиньвица, a feminine noun. All three names ultimately derive from the Proto-Slavic *pivьnica, meaning "cellar".

== Demographics ==
=== Historical population ===
- 1961: 5,541
- 1971: 5,162
- 1981: 4,820
- 1991: 4,361
- 2011: 3,337
- 2022: 2,812

=== Ethnic groups ===
According to data from the 2022 census, ethnic groups in the village include:

- 2,058 (73.2%) Slovaks
- 532 (18.9%) Serbs
- Others/Undeclared/Unknown

== See also ==
- List of places in Serbia
- List of cities, towns and villages in Vojvodina
