= Temerin =

Temerin Темерин (Serbian) Temerin (Hungarian)
- Town and municipality
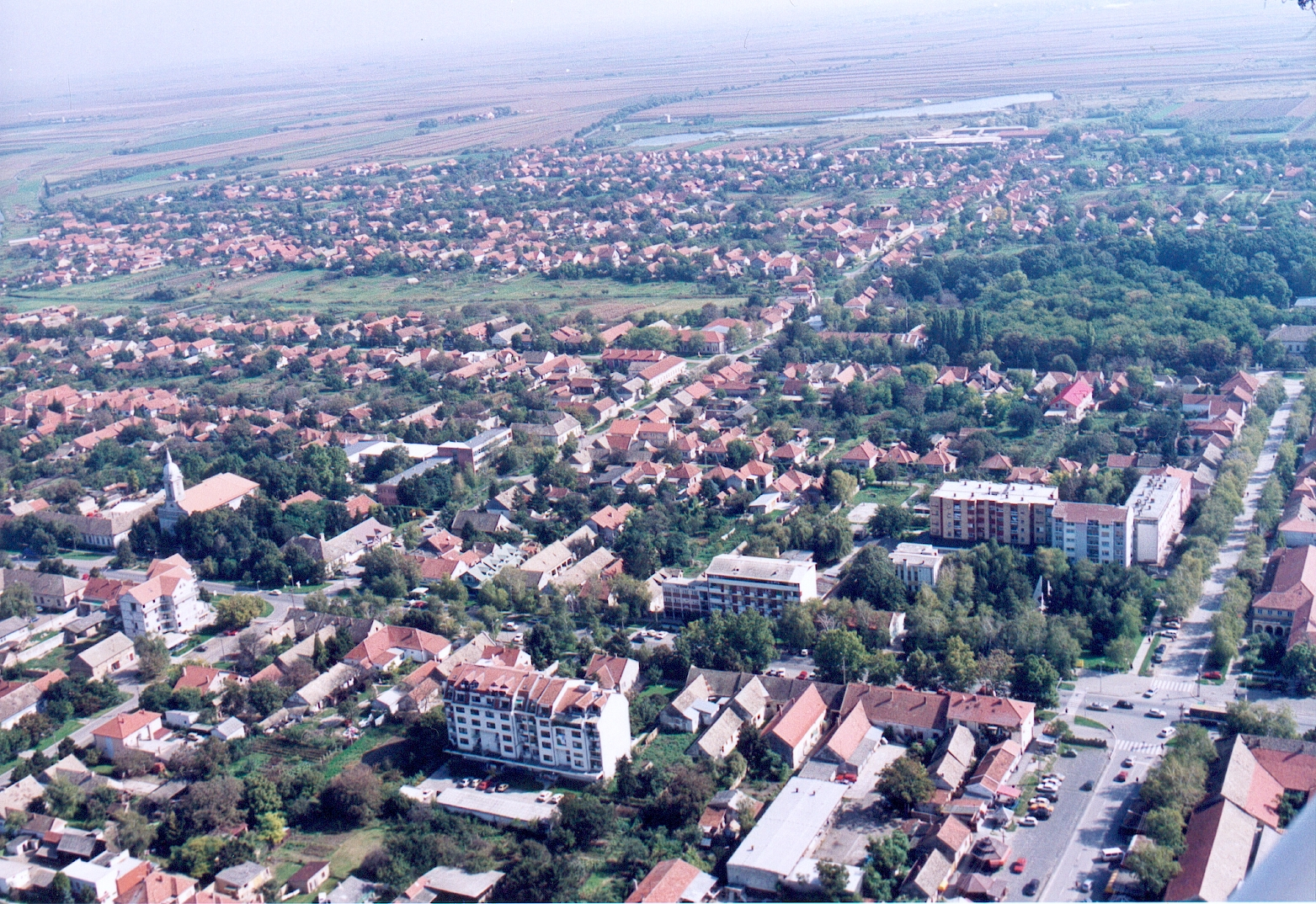
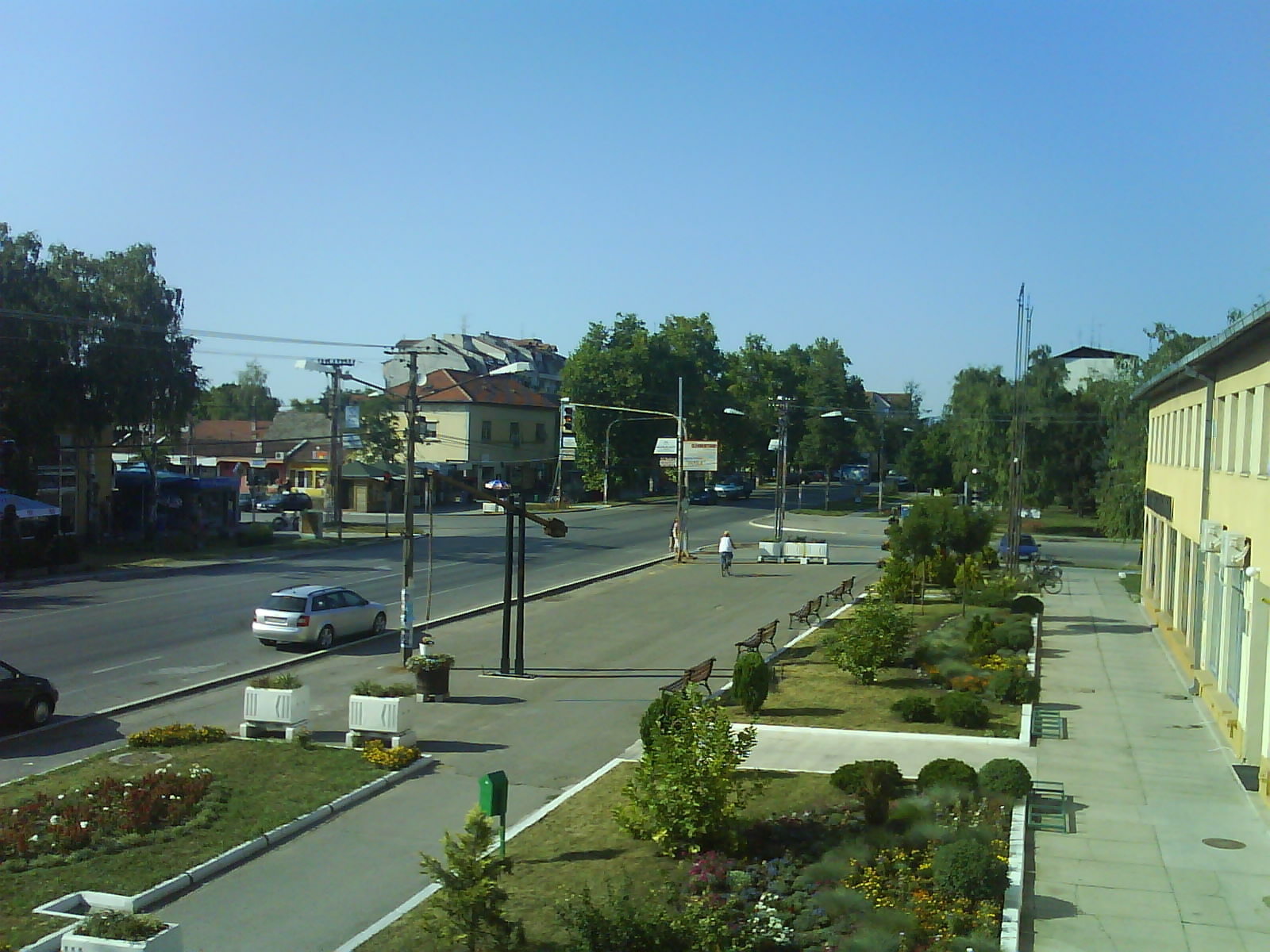
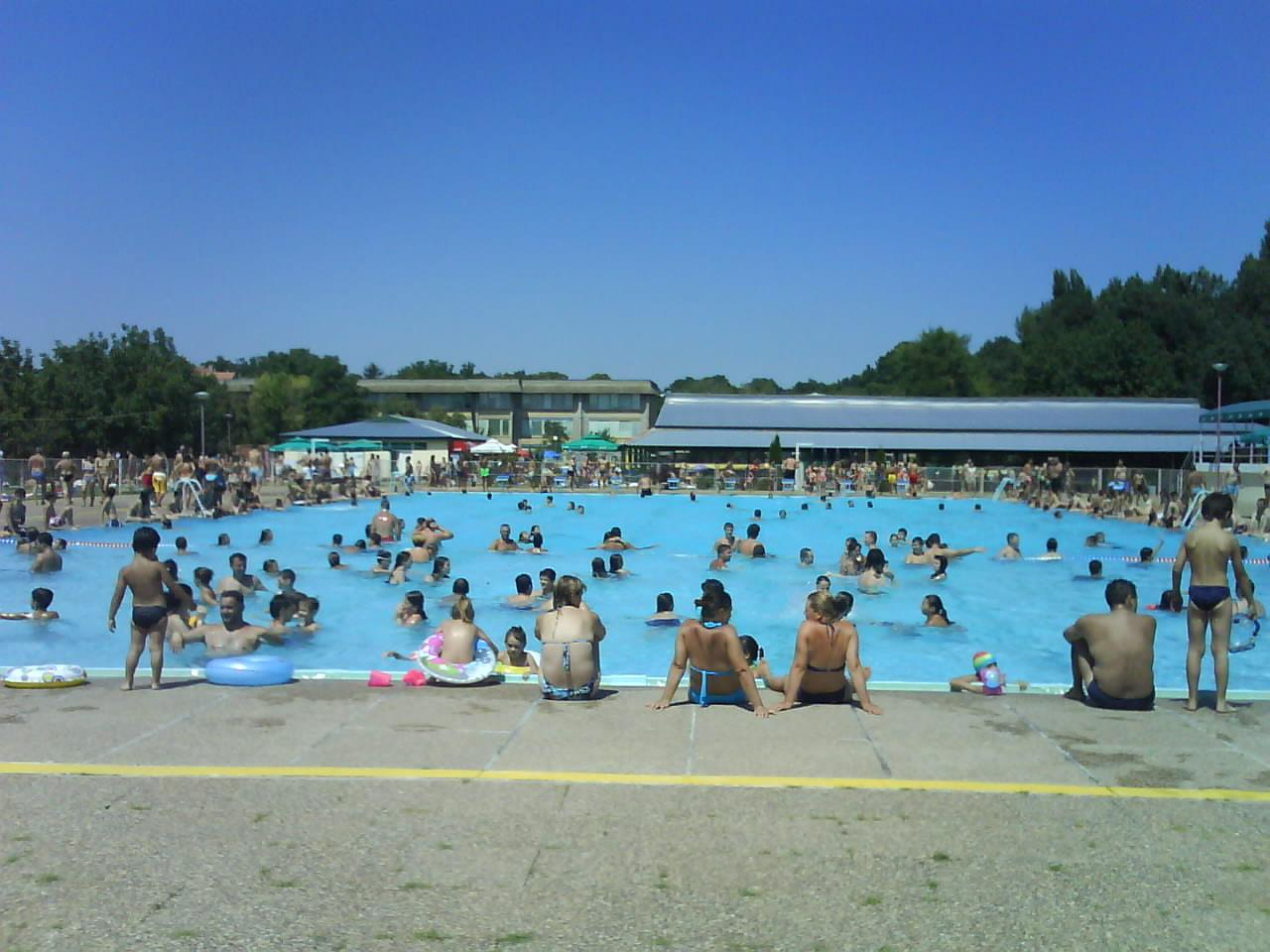
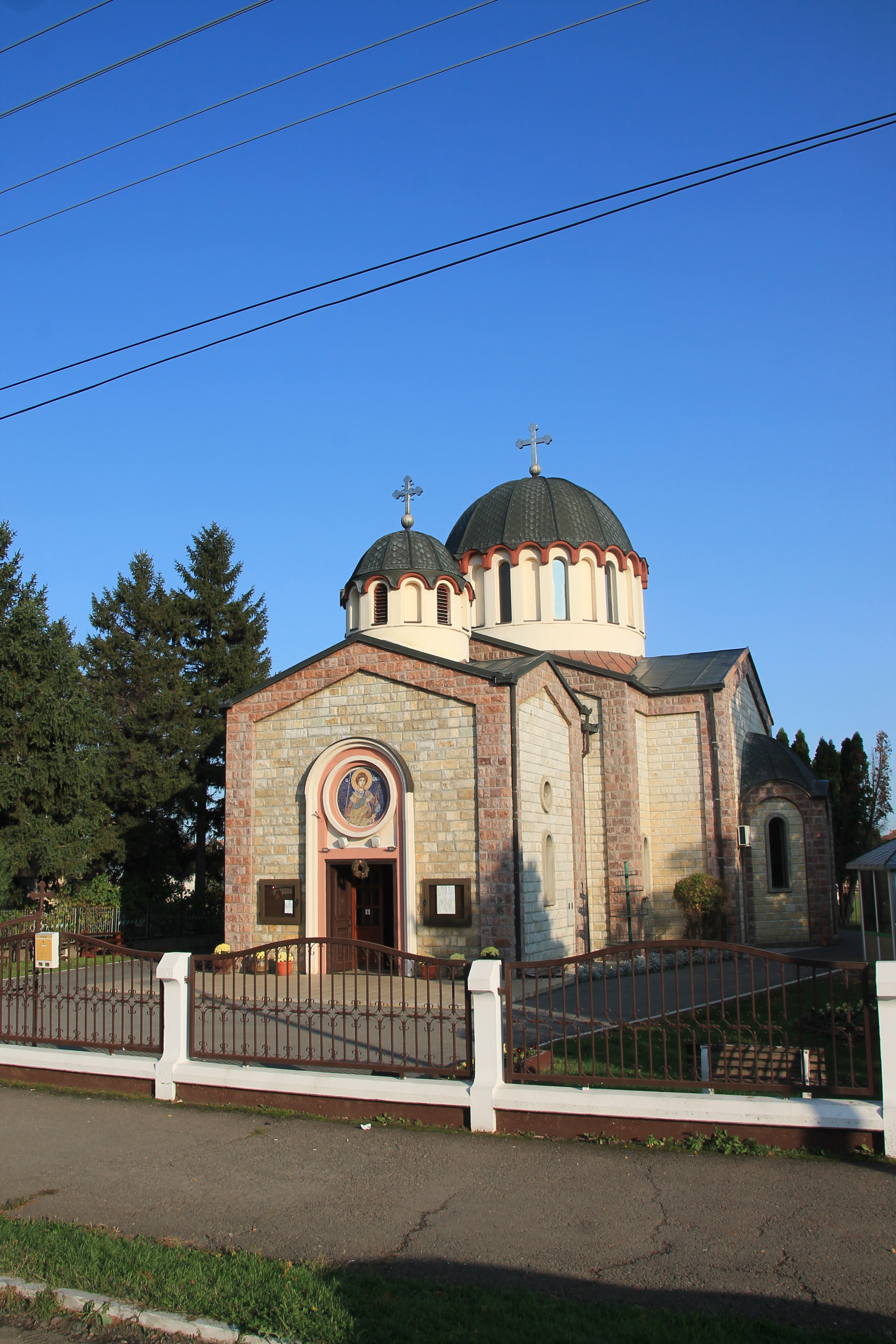
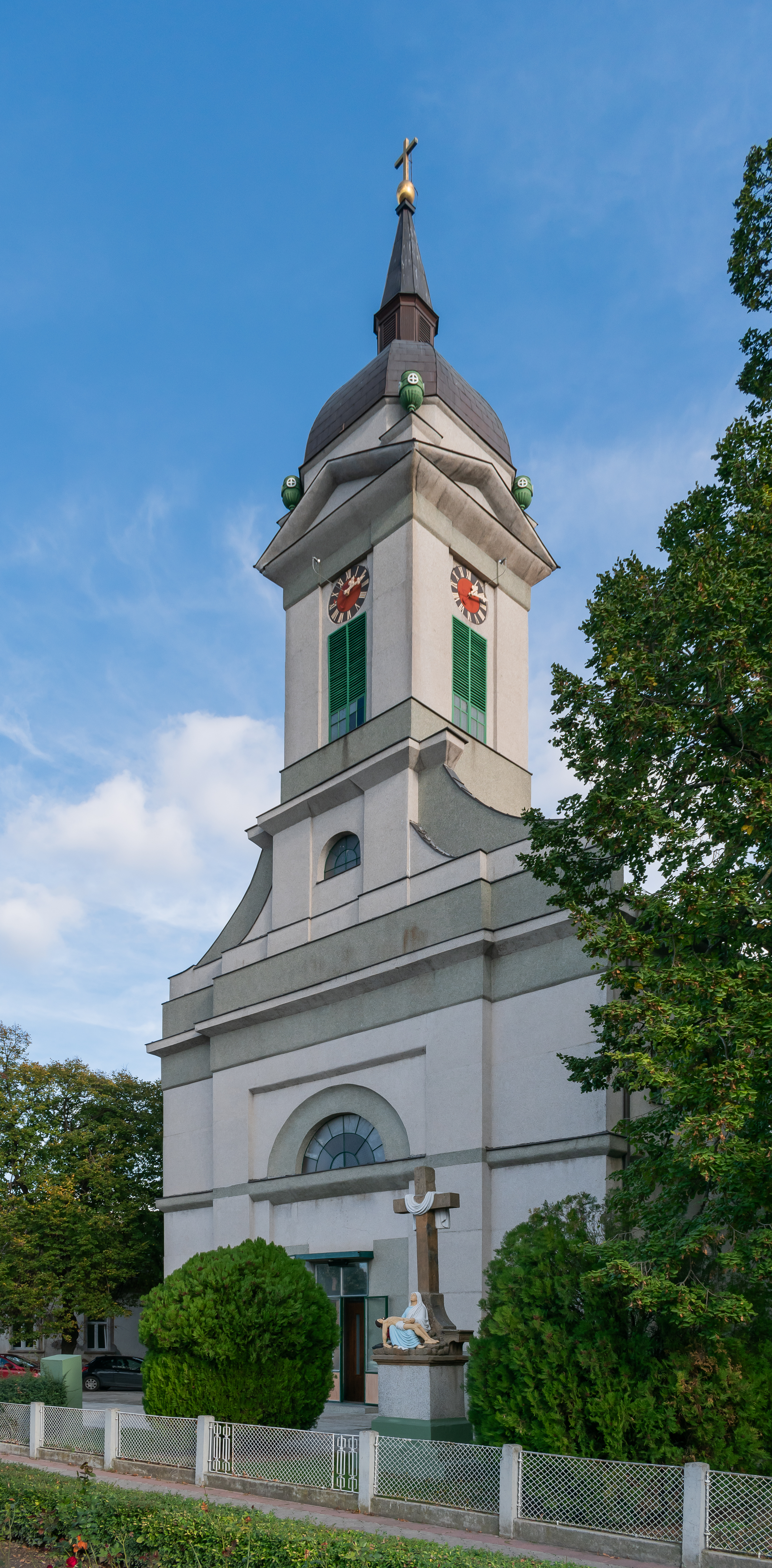
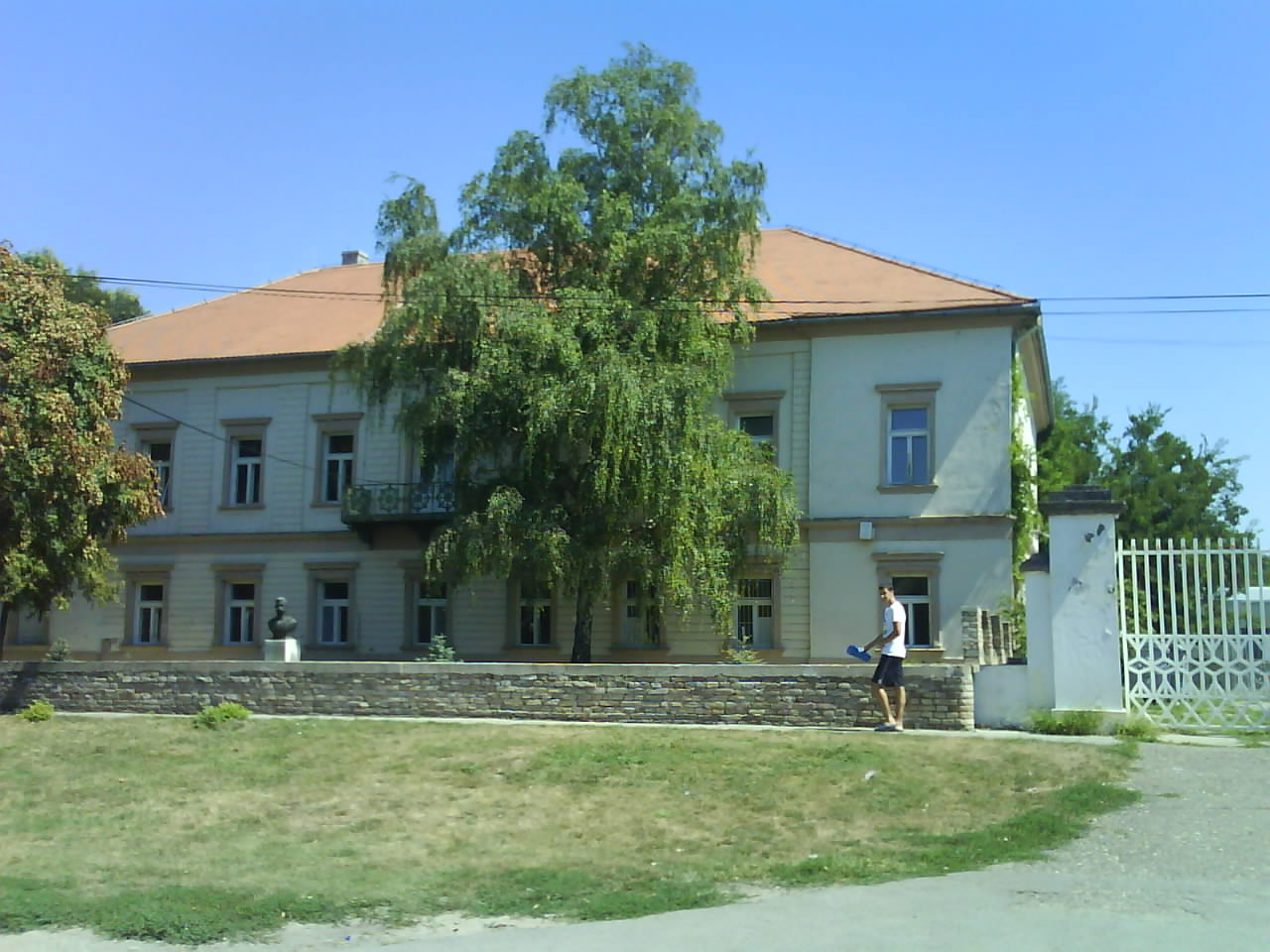
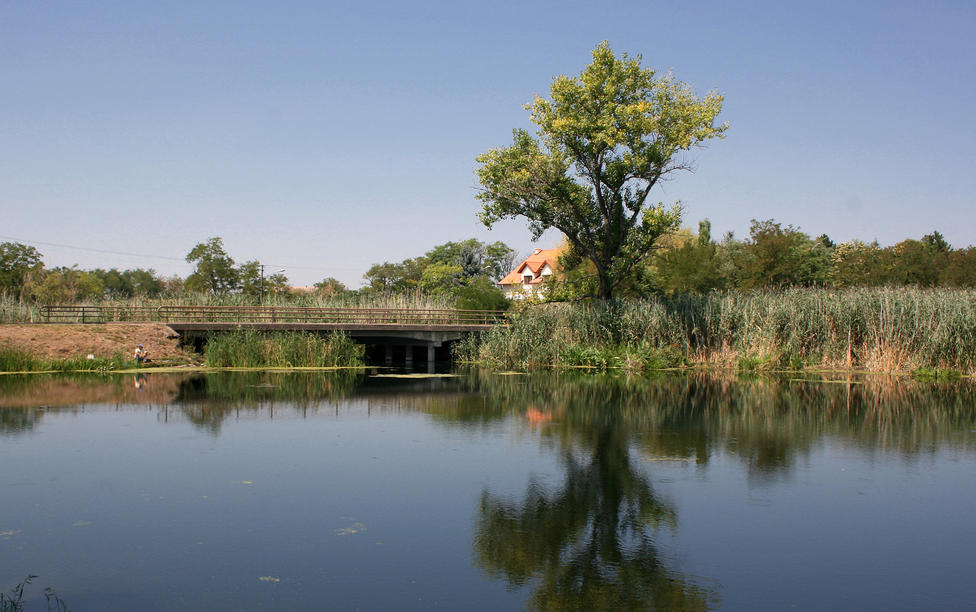
- Panorama of Temerin Temerin Town Centre Temerin Swimming Pool Church of St. George Church of St. Rosalia Technical School in Temerin Jegrička in Temerin

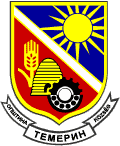
- Coat of arms

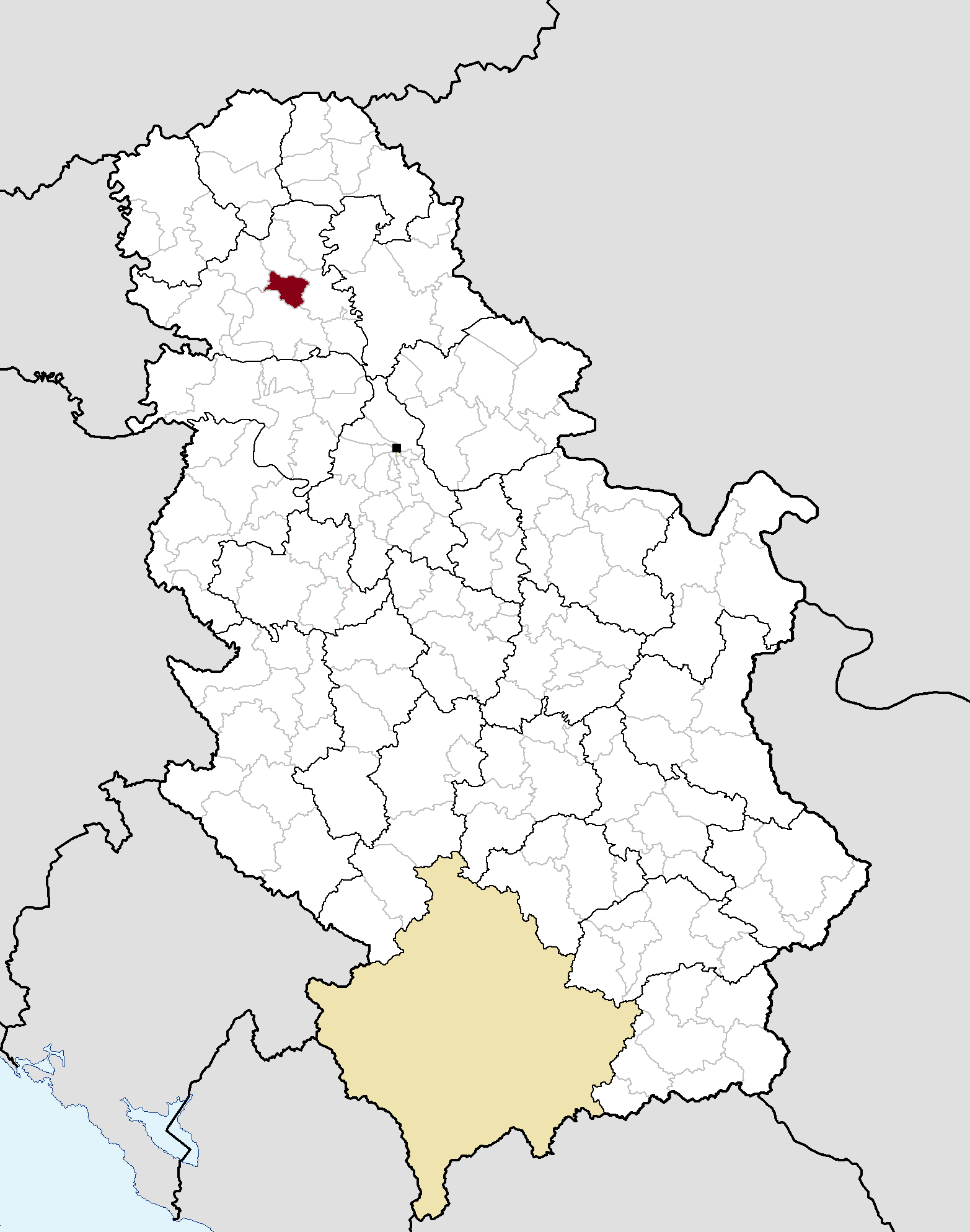
- Location of the municipality of Temerin within Serbia
- Coordinates: 45°25′N 19°53′E
- Country: Serbia
- Province: Vojvodina
- District: South Bačka
- Settlements: 3

Government
  - Mayor: Mladen Zec (Independent)

Area
  - Municipality: 170 km^{2} (66 sq mi)
- Elevation: 83 m (272 ft)

Population (2022 census)
  - Town: 17,998
  - Municipality: 25,780
- Time zone: UTC+1 (CET)
  - Summer (DST): UTC+2 (CEST)
- Postal code: 21235
- Area code: +381 21
- Car plates: NS
- Official languages: Serbian together with Hungarian
- Website: www.temerin.rs

Temerin (Serbian Cyrillic: Темерин; Hungarian: Temerin, pronounced [ˈtɛmɛrin]) is a town and municipality located in the South Bačka District of the autonomous province of Vojvodina in Serbia. The town has a population of 17,998, while the municipality has a population of 25,780 (2022 census).

== Name ==
In Serbian, the town is known as Temerin (Темерин), in Hungarian as Temerin, in German as Temeri, and in Croatian as Temerin.

== Location ==
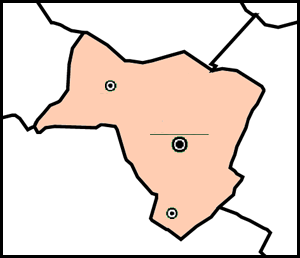

The territory of the municipality of Temerin lies in the southeast part of Bačka plain. It borders the municipalities of Žabalj to the east, Srbobran to the north, Vrbas to the west, and Novi Sad to the south.

The most influential factor in the development of Temerin is its proximity to Novi Sad, the economic center of Vojvodina. The territory of the Municipality of Temerin covers the area of around 170 km^{2} (66 sq mi), and has a shape of an irregular trapezoid, spreading in the northwest to southeast direction. The longer axis, covering the direction Sirig–Temerin, is 14 km (8.7 mi) long and the shorter axis, covering the direction Bački Jarak–Temerin, is 11 km (6.8 mi) long.

The boundaries of the municipality are largely artificial lines, mostly in rectilinear directions. The only natural boundary of the municipality is on its northeast side where it follows the water current of river Jegrička. On the southeast side the boundary is made with the embankment called Rimski Šanac II.

In regard to relief shapes of Vojvodina, the entire territory of the municipality is located in a south loessial ridge of Bačka, leaving the impression of an almost-flat surface. The river Jegrička flows through the north side of the municipality with few smaller channeled tributaries. It is established that thermo-mineral waters are present. Soil composition is quite equalized and fertility is naturally high. Different types of chernozem dominate in the area of the municipality. Along the riverbank, swampy dark types of soil and solonchak can be found: these are partly or fully salted soil types.

== History ==
=== Early history ===
In written documents, Temerin is mentioned for the first time in 1332 in the receipt by the pope, issued to Laurentius de Temeri, the parish priest, for the payment of the papal tax. In this time, Temerin was part of the Bacsensis County within the medieval Kingdom of Hungary. It remained under control of the Kingdom of Hungary until the battle of Mohács in 1526. After that battle, the settlement first became part of the Serb state of emperor Jovan Nenad (1526-1527) and was subsequently included into the Ottoman Empire, which controlled the area until the end of the 17th century. Administratively, Temerin was part of the Ottoman Sanjak of Segedin.

The list of names of the Serb inhabitants of Temerin is mentioned in the Szeged notebook dating from 1560/61. The local duke's name was Radica Stepana. There were 20 houses that paid taxes and the whole income of feudal taxes was 5,922 akče. By the end of the 17th century and Ottoman rule, Temerin was devoid of inhabitants.

=== Habsburg administration ===
From the end of the 17th century, the area was part of the Habsburg monarchy, and a population was established in the first half of the 18th century. According to D. Ruvarac, in 1722 Temerin was a Serb settlement with 183 Serb houses and three Orthodox priests: Miško, Mihajlo and Petar. In 1769 there were 208 houses, in 1773 there were 183 and in 1786 215 Serb homes. In that year five Serb Orthodox priests lived and worked in Temerin; two of them gave religious services and three of them did not.

Given Temerin's past wealth, local Serbs built an Orthodox church between 1746 and 1749 and dedicated it to Christ's ascension into Heaven. It was located at the beginning of today's Bosanska (Bosnian) street, on its right side, replaced by houses with numbers 2 through 10.

Military map and religious books from that same church are proving the existence of the church. Some of them are still kept in the church of Christ's ascension into Heaven in the village of Đurđevo. The church was made of bricks – solid material (which is important because in most of the villages churches were made of wood – as log cabins). Church dimensions were: length 17 metres (56 ft), width 6.5 metres (21 ft), and the walls were nearly 6 metres (20 ft) high. The church had church steeple, built just besides main building, 11 special windows with iron bars on them. Johan Milner built the church with assistance and coordination of Visarion Pavlović, the bishop of Bačko-Segedinska eparchy.

Among church school students is also one of the most notable people from Temerin: the writer, theology professor bishop, and polyglot Lukijan Mušicki, born in 1777 in the town. He was a friend and associate of Vuk Stefanović Karadžić, contributing to the Vuk alphabet in adding the letter “đ”.

In 1796 Chamber sold Temerin and Bački Jarak to count Sándor Szécsen for a price of 80,000 forints. Organized colonization of Temerin by Hungarians started in 1782 and the migration of Germans started in 1787. In that year they founded and settled Bački Jarak, a place which used to be barren area of Bačka until then.

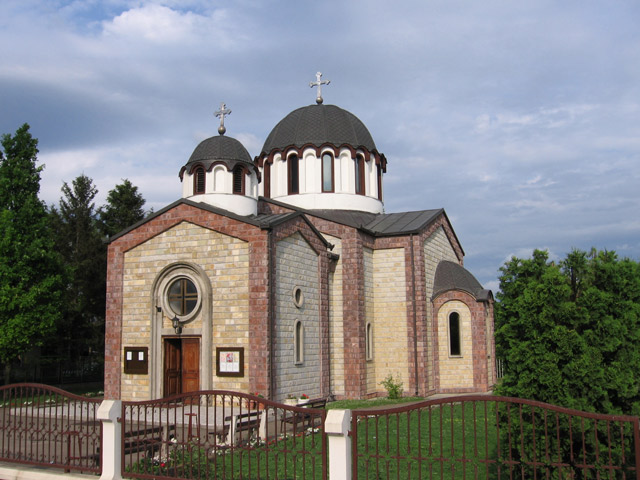
Serbian Orthodox church

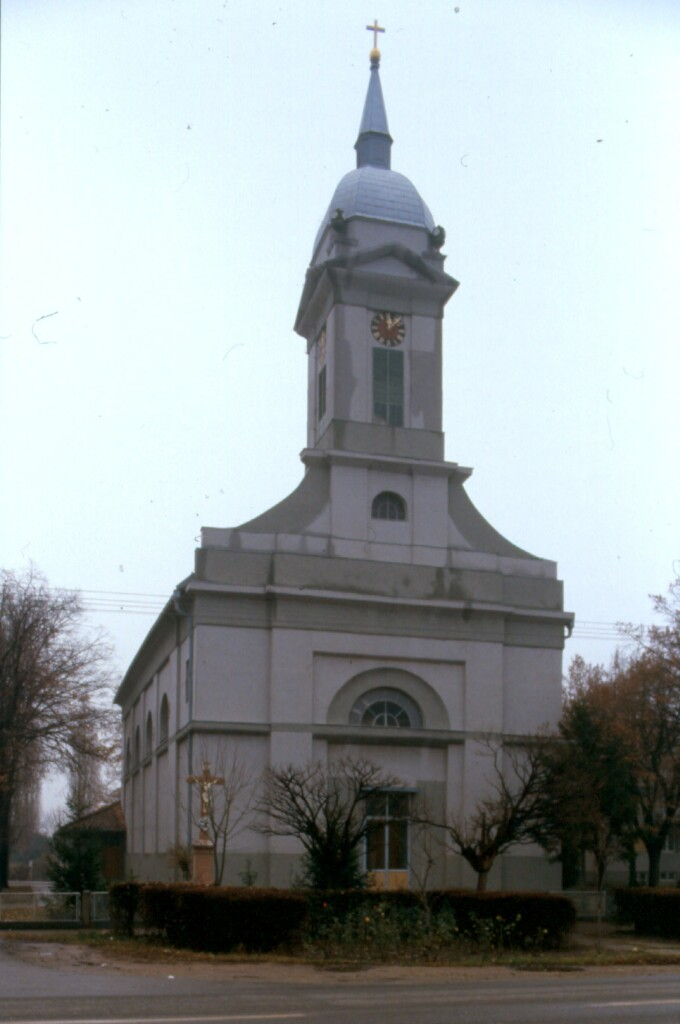
The Catholic Church

Count Sándor Szécsen tried to turn Serbs into his peasants which resulted in their four years long attempt (from 1796 to 1800) to annex Temerin to the Military Border and its nearest unit battalion of Šajkaš. This attempt failed and on July 21, 1799, they decided to move out of Temerin. Delegation sent by parish commission stopped them in their attempt by postponing their migration. On the same day that commission made a document of a great importance. Document was called “a listing of all Orthodox families from Temerin who came out for migration to the military battalion in the Paška barren area”. This important document contents the names of 178 heads of families that were leaving.

After a few months the number of immigrant families raised to 210 families and 1,610 living souls. In the spring of 1800 they tore down their houses and their church and carried all of its building material to Paška barren area where they founded new village named Đurđevo. Name was given because they moved on a St. George day (“Sveti Đorđe”). Only five years later they built a new, even bigger church out of the material they brought with themselves. They dedicated the new church to Christ's ascension into Heaven, same as they did in Temerin.

For next 120 years Temerin was almost without Serbs, count Szécsen brought Hungarian settlers, peasants from counties Pest, Fejér and Tolna. Same count ordered building of a very representative palace (castle), so called "Kaštel" / "Kastély", which is now under state jurisdiction. Nowadays it houses secondary school of techniques.

Szécsen family sold the Temerin property and "Kaštel" / "Kastély" to grain merchant Antal Fernbah from Apatin. Ana and Petar Fernbah were his heirs and they kept complete Temerin property until agrarian reform in the Kingdom of SHS (Serbs, Croats and Slovenes) in 1920.

In 1799 Temerin was declared a town and was given a right to hold 4 livestock fairs per year. Catholic Church was built in 1804, and the "old school" in 1835. From the 18th century to 1848/1849, Temerin was administratively a part of the Batsch-Bodrog County within the Habsburg Kingdom of Hungary. In 1848–49, the settlement was part of autonomous Serbian Vojvodina and in 1849-1860 part of the Voivodeship of Serbia and Banat of Temeschwar, a separate Austrian crown land. It was part of the Batschka-Torontal District (1849-1850) and Neusatz District (1850–1860) within the voivodeship. After the abolishment of the voivodeship in 1860, the settlement was again included into Batsch-Bodrog County. Tumultuous times and 1848–1849 revolution did not spare Temerin. In clashes it was burned completely and the settlers migrated to the north, in Bačka Topola, Mali Iđoš, Čantavir and other settlements. After 4–6 months most of them returned to their old homes.

On July 2, 1899, a railway direction Novi Sad–Temerin–Bečej was built and put in function as well as the railway station in Temerin. That started industrial development of Temerin, putting into operation one brick plant and first steam mills. Temerin soon became one of the important trading centers in the southeast part of Bačka. In the year 1900, Temerin had 9,581 inhabitants, including 8,711 speakers of Hungarian language, 787 speakers of German language, and 13 speakers of Serbian language.

=== After 1918 ===
In 1918, Temerin (as part of the Banat, Bačka and Baranja region) firstly became part of the Kingdom of Serbia and then part of the Kingdom of Serbs, Croats and Slovenes (later renamed to Yugoslavia). Creation of the Kingdom of Serbs, Croats and Slovenes marked a new period in the history and the economy of the town. Fernbah's properties were one of the agrarian reform targets. Agrarian authorities from Belgrade and Novi Sad put a new law into effect, colonized farmers from Novi Sad and its vicinity and colonized volunteers. In 1920 started a creation of a new colony of volunteers south of Temerin, 18 km north of Novi Sad and next to road Novi Sad–Bečej–Senta. In the memory of an old Serb settlement in Temerin, settlers named their new settlement Staro Đurđevo (Old Đurđevo) in 1929. At the beginning it had 42 families, now it has grown into a place with over 1,100 households and about 4,000 settlers.

In 1918–1919, Temerin was part of the Banat, Bačka and Baranja region and also (from 1918 to 1922) part of the Novi Sad district. From 1922 to 1929, the settlement was part of the Bačka Oblast and from 1929 to 1941 part of the Danube Banovina. In 1927, between two World wars, Temerin got electricity.

From 1941 to 1944, the settlement was under Axis occupation and was attached to the Bács-Bodrog County within Horthy's Hungary. During the Hungarian military occupation (1941–1944) settlers of Staro Đurđevo and Sirig were expelled from their homes and Hungarian families from Bukovina were settled on this land. In the period 7 to 9 January 1942 48 inhabitants of the town, 42 Jews, and 6 Serbs, were killed during a series of massacres commonly known as the Novi Sad Raid. Since 1944, Temerin was part of autonomous Yugoslav Vojvodina, which (from 1945) was part of new socialist Serbia within Yugoslavia. In 1944, Hungarians from Bukovina resettled in Hungary, while founders of Staro Đurđevo and Sirig returned to their old settlements. Post-WW2 population censuses recorded Hungarian ethnic majority in the settlement. Population of the town increased from 11,438 in 1948 to 19,613 in 2011. During the 1990s, Serbs replaced Hungarians as the largest ethnic group in the settlement and 2002 census recorded a Serb ethnic majority in Temerin.

== Settlements ==
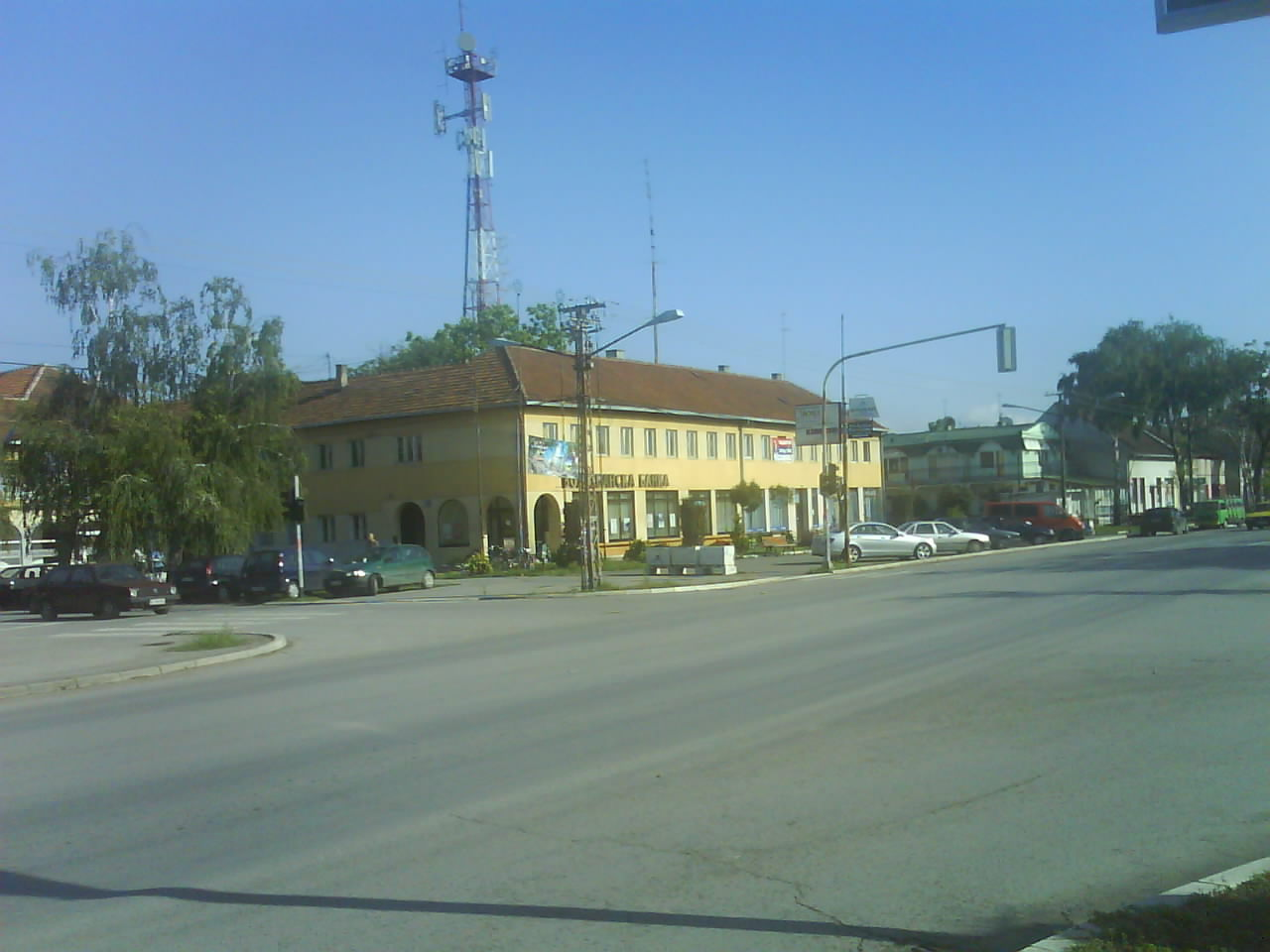
Town center

The Municipality of Temerin has three settlements: Temerin, Bački Jarak and Sirig and the territory is divided into four cadastres: Temerin, Bački Jarak, Sirig and Kamendin. Three somewhat separate parts of Temerin town are known as old Temerin, Staro Đurđevo (also known as Kolonija) and Telep. There is also inhabited area known as Kamendin, which is part of the village of Sirig.

== Demographics ==
Historical population
Year	Pop.	±% p.a.
1948	15,257	—
1953	16,157	+1.15%
1961	18,336	+1.59%
1971	19,643	+0.69%
1981	22,557	+1.39%
1991	24,939	+1.01%
2002	28,275	+1.15%
2011	28,287	+0.00%
2022	25,780	−0.84%

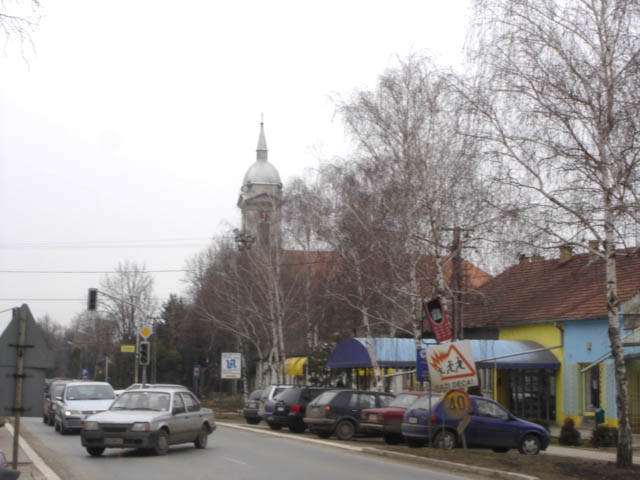
Main street and the Catholic Church

According to data from the 2022 census, the municipality of Temerin has 25,780 inhabitants. The municipality of Temerin is a multinational community with 16 different nationalities. The Serbian and Hungarian languages are officially used by municipal authorities.

Trend of population growth in Temerin area is very specific. During the last few centuries’ number of inhabitants increased for 72%.

Migrations largely influenced population structure of Temerin. In 1800 Serbs with 1,610 inhabitants from 210 families left the village and established new one about 20 km east of Temerin. Today it is called Đurđevo and is located near Žabalj. That left Temerin almost without Serbs until 1920. In that year volunteers established new settlement, Staro Đurđevo, which is now local community of the Municipality of Temerin. In 1991 it had 3,718 inhabitants and today more than 4,000 people live there.

Bački Jarak, until 1944 was populated with mostly German population, and was during 1946-1947 settled with Serb colonists, mostly from Bosnia and Herzegovina; 2,276 settlers came to Bački Jarak. In 1991 Bački Jarak had 6,000 inhabitants.

Sirig was colonized as well, in this village 63% of inhabitants are descendants of colonists. During the 1960s and 1970s several hundred families from village Vrbljani (the Municipality of Ključ, Bosnia and Herzegovina) migrated to the local community Staro Đurđevo. Economical situation was reason for that.

Temerin itself was one of the settlements where domicile population was in absolute majority. In 1961, 9,447 inhabitants were in this category, only one third of inhabitants (3,258) were migrants from other places. According to census from 1991 Temerin had 8,174 households; 3,059 of that number were farm households placed in 8,595 apartments. One of the local communities named Staro Đurđevo (3,718 inhabitants), even overgrown a village Sirig (2,546 inhabitants).

Finally, the Yugoslav Wars brought to significant changes in the ethnic structure of the municipality.

=== Ethnic groups ===
Municipality

Ethnical population structure of the Municipality of Temerin according to data from the 2022 census:

- Serbs = 17,994 (69.7%)
- Hungarians = 5,607 (21.7%)
- Others/Undeclared/Unknown = 2,179 (8.4%)

All of the three settlements in the municipality have an ethnic Serb majority.

Town

Ethnical population structure of the town of Temerin according to data from the 2022 census:

- Serbs = 10,776 (59.9%)
- Hungarians = 5,501 (30.5%)
- Others/Undeclared/Unknown = 1,721 (9.5%)

== Economy ==
The following table gives a preview of total number of employed people per their core activity (as of 2017):

Activity	Total
Agriculture, forestry and fishing	436
Mining	-
Processing industry	2,154
Distribution of power, gas and water	37
Distribution of water and water waste management	194
Construction	320
Wholesale and retail, repair	1,297
Traffic, storage and communication	228
Hotels and restaurants	185
Media and telecommunications	38
Finance and insurance	78
Property stock and charter	4
Professional, scientific, innovative and technical activities	196
Administrative and other services	17
Administration and social assurance	241
Education	334
Healthcare and social work	304
Art, leisure and recreation	50
Other services	114
Total	6,229

== Transportation ==
Geographical location of the Municipality of Temerin is very favorable. In the meridian direction the municipality is cut by three important roads. The most important is international road E-75 which drives from Novi Sad towards Subotica and then further to Hungary.

Road section Novi Sad–Srbobran, cutting the west part of the Municipality of Temerin, was put into use in 1984. The second road by its importance is highway M-22 (since recently international way E-5) which has the nearly the same direction. M-22 leads bit more eastern than E-75 and goes through village named Sirig.

The third road is one with regional importance (R-120), going through Novi Sad, Bački Jarak and Temerin and leading to Bečej, Senta and Kanjiža. At Sirig and Temerin all these roads are crossed by regional road (R-104) which has Odžaci–Zmajevo–Sirig–Temerin–Žabalj direction. From here a main road leads over Tisa to Zrenjanin and other towns in Banat. Through the southeast part of the municipality and its two settlements—Bački Jarak and Temerin, leads a railway from Novi Sad to Žabalj, Bečej and Senta.

== Sports ==
Local football club Sloga has been competing in Serbia's fourth tier continuously since 2017.

== Politics ==
=== 2004 elections ===
Seats in the municipal parliament won in the 2004 local elections:

- Serbian Radical Party (12)
- Democratic Party (6)
- Democratic Party of Vojvodina Hungarians (5)
- Alliance of Vojvodina Hungarians (3)
- Strength of Serbia Movement (2)
- Socialist Party of Serbia (2)
- Group of citizens "List for prosperity" (2)
- Democratic Party of Serbia (1)

=== 2008 elections ===
Seats in the municipal parliament won in the 2008 local elections:

- Serbian Radical Party (11)
- Hungarian Coalition (8)
- Democratic Party (6)
- Socialist Party of Serbia (2)
- Democratic Party of Serbia (2)
- Strength of Serbia Movement (2)
- Group "Prosperity for Temerin" (2)

== Geography ==
=== Relief ===
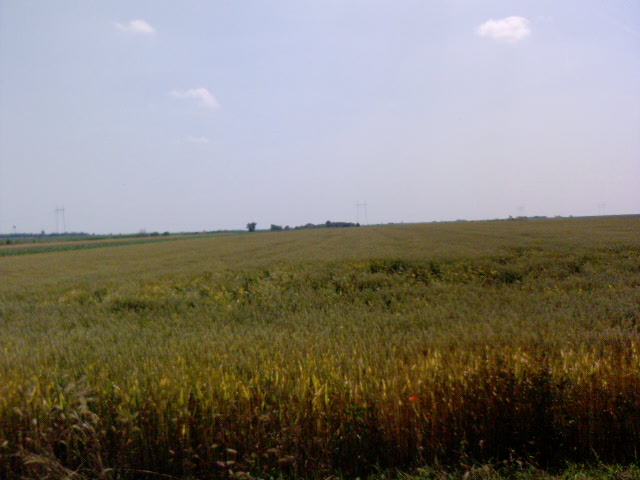
Wheat field near Temerin

Territory of the Municipality of Temerin is a plain terrain with almost imperceptible distinctions in height. If we study relief the southern part of Bačka (in Vojvodina) and we can single out few geomorphological shapes based on soil composition and its genesis. These are Titelski breg – loessial ridge, alluvial ridge of river Danube and inundational planes of river Danube and river Tisa.

Total area of the Municipality of Temerin is placed in the eastern part of south loessial ridge of Bačka. Heights above sea level vary from 81 m to 83 m. Monotony of Bačka plain is disturbed only by lonely hillocks and valleys of smaller water currents.

=== Climate ===
Being a part of Pannonian plain the Municipality of Temerin has its climate characteristics. Pannonian plain is quite far away from the Adriatic or the Mediterranean Sea on the south and the Atlantic Ocean on the west. These distances are even bigger because of Dinarics and Alps mountain ranges which keep the humid airstreams coming from seas and oceans away. Airstreams, influencing weather changes through the year, are conditioned by unequal warming of Earth surface and different atmospheric pressures above Adriatic and Mediterranean, Atlantic Ocean and wide Euro-Asian land. Water surfaces cause breach of humid airflows into Pannonian plain and land surfaces on the north and east influence dry, very cold airstreams in winter and very hot airstreams in summer. Influenced by all of these causes, Pannonian plain has the most continental climate in Serbia.

=== Rivers ===
There are no longer any natural waterways within the Municipality of Temerin, all having been diverted into canals and included in the DTD hydrosystem, and used for agricultural irrigation.

Jegrička is the largest stream on the south loessial Bačka ridge and area of the Municipality of Temerin. Jegrička is a 64.5 km long tributary of Tisa that empties into the Tisa on its right side. The river course was formed during the Holocene, the youngest period of Earth history. At that period ground in the south part of Bačka lowered in a line that was later inherited by this water current.

Jegrička is formed from water of few swamps from areas of Despotovo, Silbaš, Parage, Ratkovo and Pivnice. River enters into the Temerin territory on its west side, from the Municipality of Vrbas. The part of Jegrička that flows through the Municipality of Temerin has the length of 18 km which is 28% of its total length. River flows about 1 km north of Sirig and about 2 km north of Temerin. From a place where the river crosses the Temerin–Bečej road it becomes the municipality borderline.

=== Soil ===
Analyzing the soil map of Vojvodina we can separate eight different types of soil in the territory of the Municipality of Temerin. The most represented are subtypes of chernozem: carbonated chernozem, carbonated chernozem with signs of earlier contact with swamp, carbonated chernozem with signs of gleying in loess, solonchak chernozem, carbonated and sporadically salted swampy dark soil, meadow carbonated dark soil, swampy noncarbonated dark soil and solonchak.

=== Flora ===
Area of loessial ridge that covers the biggest part of the Municipality of Temerin resembles steppe grassy vegetation. Development of agriculture during the 18th and 19th centuries brought disappearance of pastures with growing wild vegetation. Cultivation plants were planted; nowadays dominating plants are cereals, industrial plants and vegetables. Fruits and grapevine are not so often.

Narrow areas along rivers and lines of communication are full of wild growing vegetation: wild poppy, corn cockle, spurge, horse basil, meadow buttercup, red clover, yarrow, foxglove, burdock, nettle, chamomile, mustard, etc. Around and in riverbeds, there are cane, cattail, water lily and alga. There are no bigger forest areas, but around farms (“salaš”) smaller forests of black locust and poplar with few mulberry trees can be seen. Pine trees have been planted around motels near Sirig and Temerin.

=== Fauna ===
Animal world used to be more numerous and various. Changes in agriculture development caused reduction of total number and number of wild animal species.

There are field mice, rats, polecats, weasels, ground squirrels, hamsters, hedgehogs and moles which inhabit the large areas planted with corn. Larger animals, used as hunting game, include roe deer, foxes and hares. Birds present include sparrows, swallows, woodpeckers, starlings, cuckoos, blackbirds, wrens, storks and hooded crows. Other birds, also used as hunting game, include pheasants, partridges, mallards, wild geese, and rock doves.

There are a lot of insects: mosquitoes, flees, wasps, bees, gypsy moths, green crickets, hornets, different louses, crickets, ladybugs, moths, butterflies, etc. Among agricultural pests the widest spreads are: potato beetle, turnip beetle, grain weevil and bean weevil.

In and around water currents live various fishes: carp, bream, robin, pike, perch, as well as other animals: snails, leeches, various frogs, marsh shells, snakes, etc. A large number of domestic animals are raised.

=== Thermo-mineral waters ===
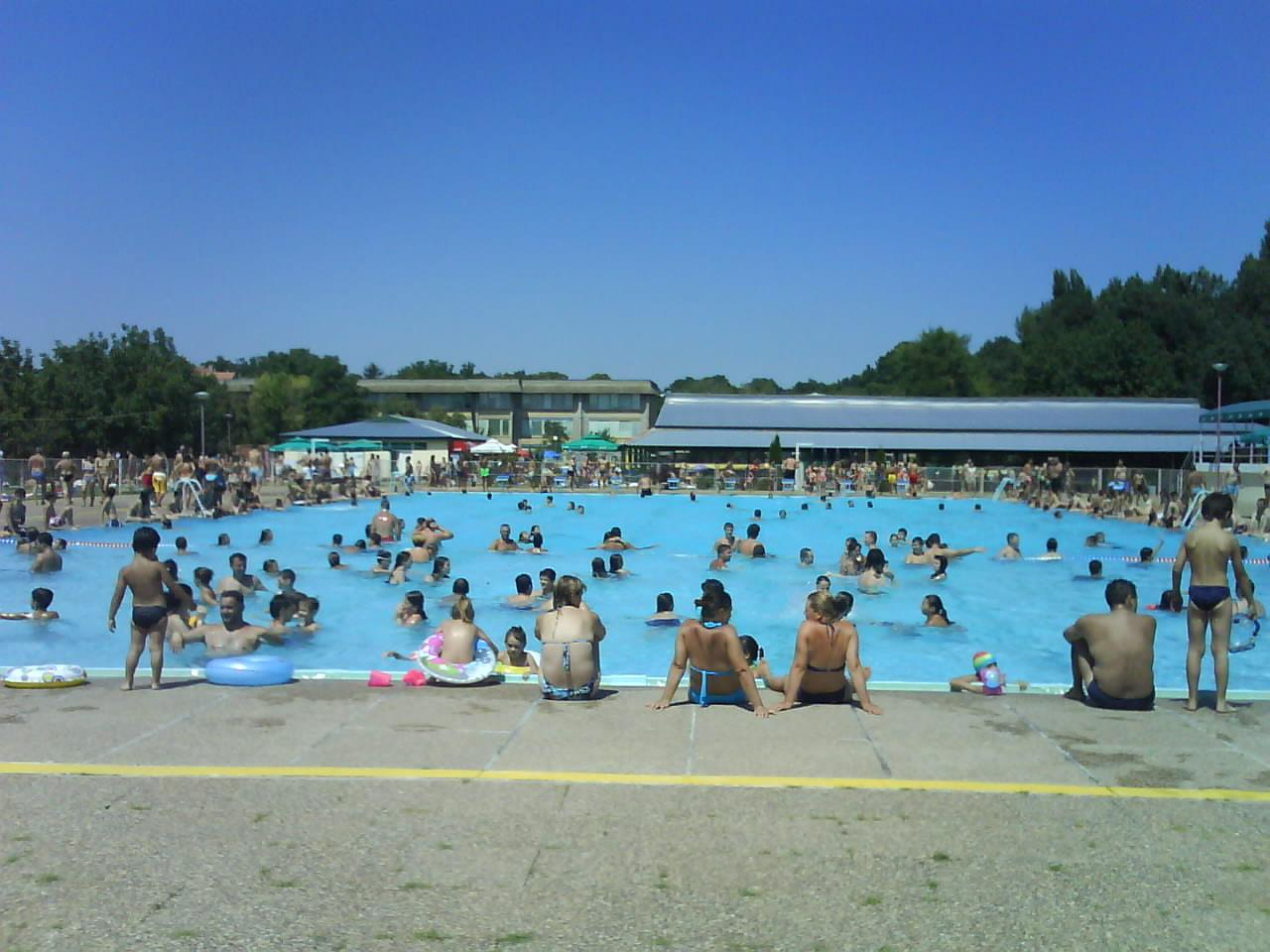
Spa and pool in Temerin

Thermo-mineral waters in Temerin were first discovered in 1914 and that is also when their exploitation started. At that time a 417 m well hole was drilled. Grisa Andraš was name of the owner. This well cuts through Quaternary and paludina deposits and gives water of 27 °C (81 °F). The quantity of water pouring out used to be 397 L/min but has lately been slightly reduced. Since these waters are also present in a depth of 200 to 1000 m, “Naftagas” from Novi Sad drilled a research drill in the center of Temerin in 1968. The drill is 2,004.5 m deep.

Chemical analysis was made in 1979 by the Institute of Physics from the University of Novi Sad. The results showed slightly base reaction (rN – 7.8), total mineralization of 2.669 g/L; characteristic ions are sodium (0.708), hydro-carbonate (1.512) and chlorine (0.337). Among other healing ingredients presence of iodine, bromine, fluorine, lithium and strontium is proven. Analysis showed presence of carbon dioxide in water. Methane which was also present was used for heating of water and rooms after separation.

Nowadays this thermo-mineral spring is used in contemporary spa bath tubes. A well next to Olympic pool has similar composition and mineralization. Its water is coming from the depth of 690 m and is used for open hot thermo-mineral pool (water temperature is 37 °C). These pools are also used by people from Novi Sad, Žabalj, Kisač, Petrovac and from all other surrounding settlements. This natural wealth is planned to be a basis for future development of a health, sport and tourist complex.

== See also ==
- Municipalities of Serbia
- List of places in Serbia
- List of cities, towns and villages in Vojvodina
- South Bačka District
