= Spring Campaign (1849) =

Hungarian offensives during the Hungarian War of Independence of 1848–1849

- Part of the Hungarian War of Independence of 1848–1849
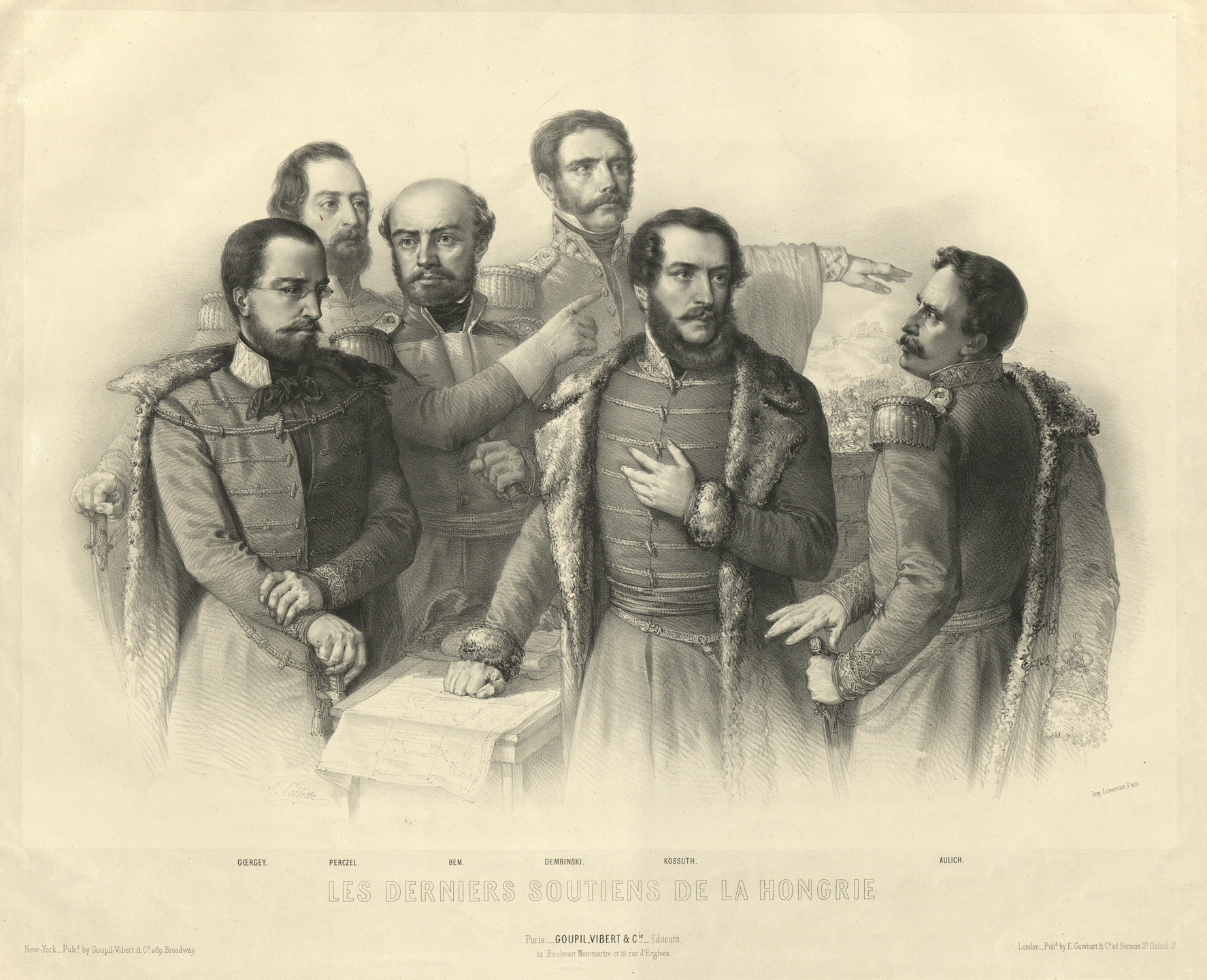
- In the forefrontː Lajos Kossuth; From left to rightː Artúr Görgei, Mór Perczel, Józef Bem, Henryk Dembiński, Lajos Aulich
Date	1 March – 14 June 1849 (Note: While in the strict sense, Spring Campaign is considered to be only the campaign of the Hungarian main army led by General Artúr Görgei against the Austrian imperial army from 2 April to 21 May, historians consider that it comprises also the Hungarian campaigns on the other fronts (Transylvania, Southern Hungary, Northern Hungary), during the whole period of the Spring, that resulted in territorial gains for Hungary.)
Location	Kingdom of Hungary and Principality of Transylvania (1711–1867)
Result	Partial Hungarian victory: Capture of much of Hungary and Transylvania, except the Kingdom of Croatia, the Western Transylvanian Mountains, a border strip in Western Hungary, and the fortresses of Temesvár, Arad, Gyulafehérvár and Déva; Creation of the Hungarian State; Despite being pushed back to the border regions, the Austrian army could not be annihilated and kept its fighting capacity; Emperor Franz Joseph I of Austria asked for Russia's intervention to crush Hungary's independence.

Belligerents
Austrian Empire: Kingdom of Croatia; Serbian Vojvodina; Serb rebels; Pro-Habsburg Hungarians; Slovak National Council; Transylvanian Romanians; Transylvanian Saxons; Supreme Ruthenian Council; Czech and Moravian volunteers; Russian Empire	Kingdom of Hungary (until 14 April) Hungarian State (from 14 April): Legions of the revolutionaries from German states; Polish legions; Italian legions; Székelys; Hungarian Jews; Hungarian Germans; Hungarian Slovenes; Pro-Hungarian Slovaks; Pro-Hungarian Romanians; Pro-Hungarian Serbs; Pro-Hungarian Rusyns; Zipser Saxons; Croats from Western Hungary and Muraköz; Šokac and Bunjevac people; Banat Bulgarians

Commanders and leaders
(Austrian Empire) Franz Joseph I; (Austrian Empire) Alfred I of Windisch-Grätz; (Austrian Empire) Ludwig von Welden; (Austrian Empire) Franz Schlik; (Austrian Empire) Christian Götz (DOW); (Austrian Empire) Heinrich Hentzi (DOW); (Austrian Empire) Anton Puchner; (Austrian Empire) Josip Jelačić; (Austrian Empire) Stevan Knićanin; (Austrian Empire) Avram Iancu; (Russian Empire) Grigory Skariatin	(Kingdom of Hungary (1526–1867)) (Hungarian State (1849)) Lajos Kossuth; (Kingdom of Hungary (1526–1867)) (Hungarian State (1849)) Artúr Görgei; (Kingdom of Hungary (1526–1867)) (Hungarian State (1849)) György Klapka; (Kingdom of Hungary (1526–1867)) (Hungarian State (1849)) János Damjanich; (Kingdom of Hungary (1526–1867)) (Hungarian State (1849)) Lajos Aulich; (Kingdom of Hungary (1526–1867)) (Hungarian State (1849)) Mór Perczel; (Poland) Józef Bem

Strength
(Austrian Empire) 112,216 soldiers & 767 guns; (Russian Empire) 7,000 soldiers & 14 guns; (Austrian Empire) 70,000 men	110,000 soldiers & 700 guns

The Spring Campaign (Hungarian: tavaszi hadjárat), also called the Glorious Spring Campaign (Hungarian: dicsőséges tavaszi hadjárat) was the military campaign of the Hungarian Revolutionary Army against the forces of the Habsburg Empire in Middle and Western Hungary during the Hungarian War of Independence of 1848–1849 between March and June 1849, which resulted in the capture of almost the whole territory of Hungary from the Habsburg forces.

The spring campaign's commander-in-chief was General Artúr Görgei, whose army (47 500 men, 198 cannons) defeated the numerically, technologically and tactically superior (55 000 soldiers and 214 cannons and rockets) imperial armies led by Alfred I, Prince of Windisch-Grätz and after his dismissal, Ludwig von Welden, in a series of victories. The Hungarians won the battles of Hatvan (2 April), Tápióbicske (4 April), Isaszeg (6 April), Vác (10 April), Nagysalló (19 April), on 26 April relieved the fortress of Komárom from a long Austrian siege, then on 21 May 1849 liberated the Castle of Buda, concluding the Spring Campaign.

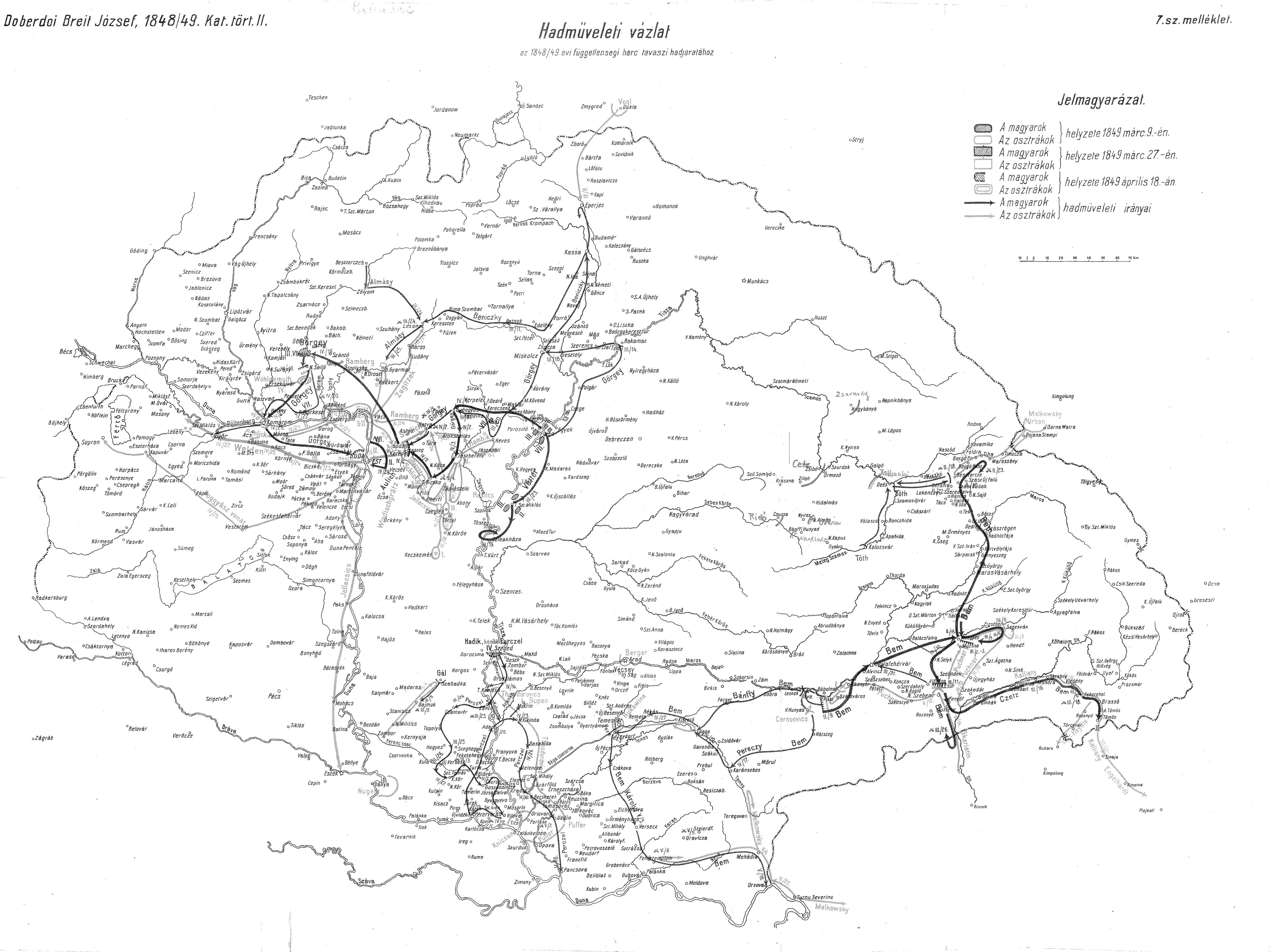
Map of the Spring campaign in 1849 Hungarian kingdom

On the other theaters of operations, the Hungarians also scored victories against the enemies of the revolution. In Transylvania, the Hungarian army led by Józef Bem, after the victory against the Austro-Russian forces in the Battle of Nagyszeben from 11 March, captured most of the provinces territory (excepting the fortresses of Gyulafehérvár, Déva, with imperial garrison and the Erdélyi-középhegység mountains, held by the Romanian insurgents). In southern Hungary the Hungarians led by Mór Perczel and Józef Bem defeated the Serb insurgents and Austrian troops, capturing the provinces of Bácska and Bánság, except the fortress of Temesvár and Titel. In southern Transdanubia, the popular uprising led by Gáspár Noszlopy also led to the capture of this region from imperial rule. During the Spring Campaign, the Hungarians captured much of Hungary from Habsburg rule. The Habsburg armies and their allies, besides the fortresses and mountains mentioned above, remained only in the westernmost territory strip of Hungary, Croatia and the fortress of Arad.

Additionally, the result of the Spring Campaign's victories was the Hungarian Declaration of Independence on 14 April 1849, which led to total Hungarian independence for several months before the Russian intervention brought about the defeat of the Hungarian revolution and war of independence in the Summer Campaign.

== Background ==
In December 1848, the Habsburg camarilla decided to attack Hungary and force the Hungarian state back into complete subjugation, as it had been before the March 15 revolution. The forced abdication of King Ferdinand V preceded the outbreak of armed conflict between the Hungarian and the Austrian imperial forces. Since he had sworn allegiance to the Hungarian constitution, Ferdinand could not give the order to attack the country, and because of this, on 2 December 1848, his nephew, Franz Joseph I, ascended the throne without swearing loyalty to the Hungarian constitution. When the Hungarian Parliament heard about this event, it rejected his legitimacy, recognizing only Ferdinand as king and declaring Franz Joseph a usurper.

In autumn 1848, Western Hungary was defended by General Artúr Görgei’s 28,000 soldiers against Field Marshal Alfred zu Windisch-Grätz’s 55,000. In December, General Schlik invaded Upper Hungary, defeating the Hungarian minister of war, Lieutenant General Lázár Mészáros in the Battle of Kassa. Meanwhile, Windisch-Grätz broke from the West into Hungary through the River Leitha, forcing Görgei to retreat towards Győr, then towards the capital. After Perczel’s defeat in the Battle of Mór on December 30, Buda and Pest could no longer be defended, so the Parliament retreated to Debrecen. After entering the Hungarian capitals on 5 January 1849, the imperial commander demanded unconditional surrender from the Hungarian delegation that visited him and asked him to negotiate.

Because of the Austrian offensive in December and January, the Hungarian forces retreated from Western and much of Central Hungary and regrouped behind the Tisza River. On January 5, Görgei issued the Vác Proclamation, pledging loyalty to the Hungarian constitution while rejecting any other authority. The new Hungarian strategy was to concentrate György Klapka's, Perczel's, and Görgei’s armies along the Tisza. In Northern Hungary, Klapka, who took over the command from Mészáros, successfully repelled Schlik's Austrian army near Tarcal, Bodrogkeresztúr, and Tokaj, while Görgei’s breakthrough at the Branyiszkó Pass on February 5 opened the way for a counter-offensive.

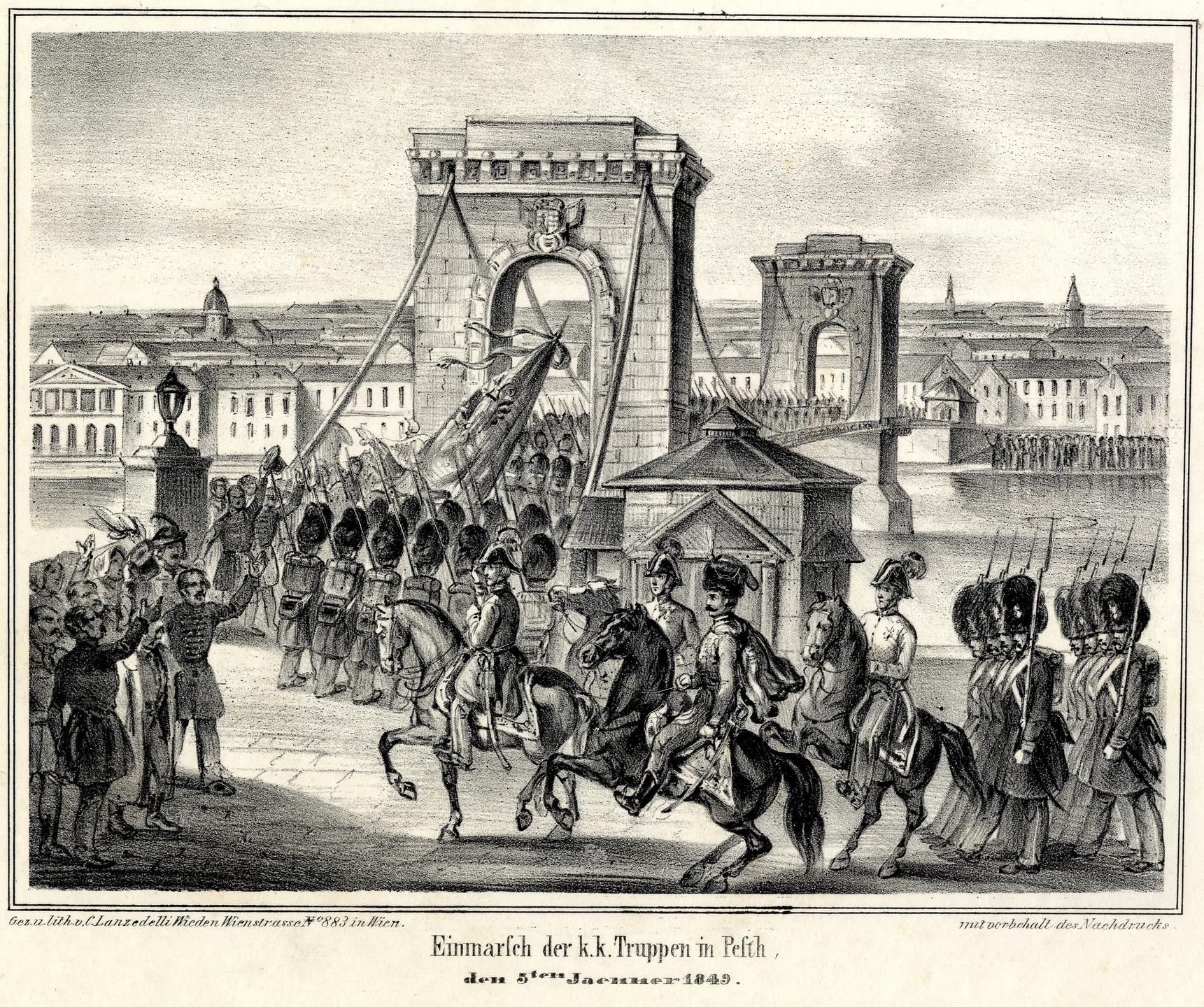
Austrian troops entering Pest on 5 January 1849 (Karl Lanzedelly)

At the start of December, no Hungarian troops were present in Transylvania, excepting the Székely resistance in the Háromszék Seat in the southeast. Meanwhile, the Hungarian troops who had retreated to the Western border of Transylvania were taken over by General Józef Bem, a very talented Polish commander, who routed the Austrian troops, and by Christmas, he had retaken Kolozsvár and northern Transylvania. But at the end of January, he suffered some setbacks (First Battle of Nagyszeben, Battle of Vízakna) against the Austrian Lieutenant General Anton Puchner, supported by Romanian insurgents and a 7000-strong Russian troop. But on February 9, he won an important victory at the Battle of Piski, and then he pushed back the Austrian troops, who had broken into northern Transylvania.

In the south, after a successful December for the Hungarians (ex., Battle of Jarkovác), the imperial and Serb forces achieved an important victory in the Battle of Pancsova on 2 January. Matters worsened for the Hungarians when the Hungarian military command ordered all troops fighting in the south to retreat behind the Maros River, leaving the entire southern part of the country in enemy hands. They gave this order because they were preparing to launch a counterattack against the Austrian main army, which was led by Windisch-Grätz and reinforced by these troops.

By February, however, Hungarian forces had consolidated behind the Tisza and were preparing for a new campaign. Henryk Dembiński was appointed commander-in-chief by Lajos Kossuth in opposition to Görgei, whom Kossuth did not trust. Dembiński prepared to attack the main Austrian army but made several mistakes, resulting in his defeat at the Battle of Kápolna on February 26–27. This forced the Hungarian troops to retreat behind the Tisza River.

== Opposing forces ==
=== Hungarians ===
In the last days of March, four Hungarian corps (I, II, III, VII) massed in Tiszántúl (the region east of Tisza) to launch the campaign against the Imperial main army. The four corps had in total 52,300 men and 184 guns.

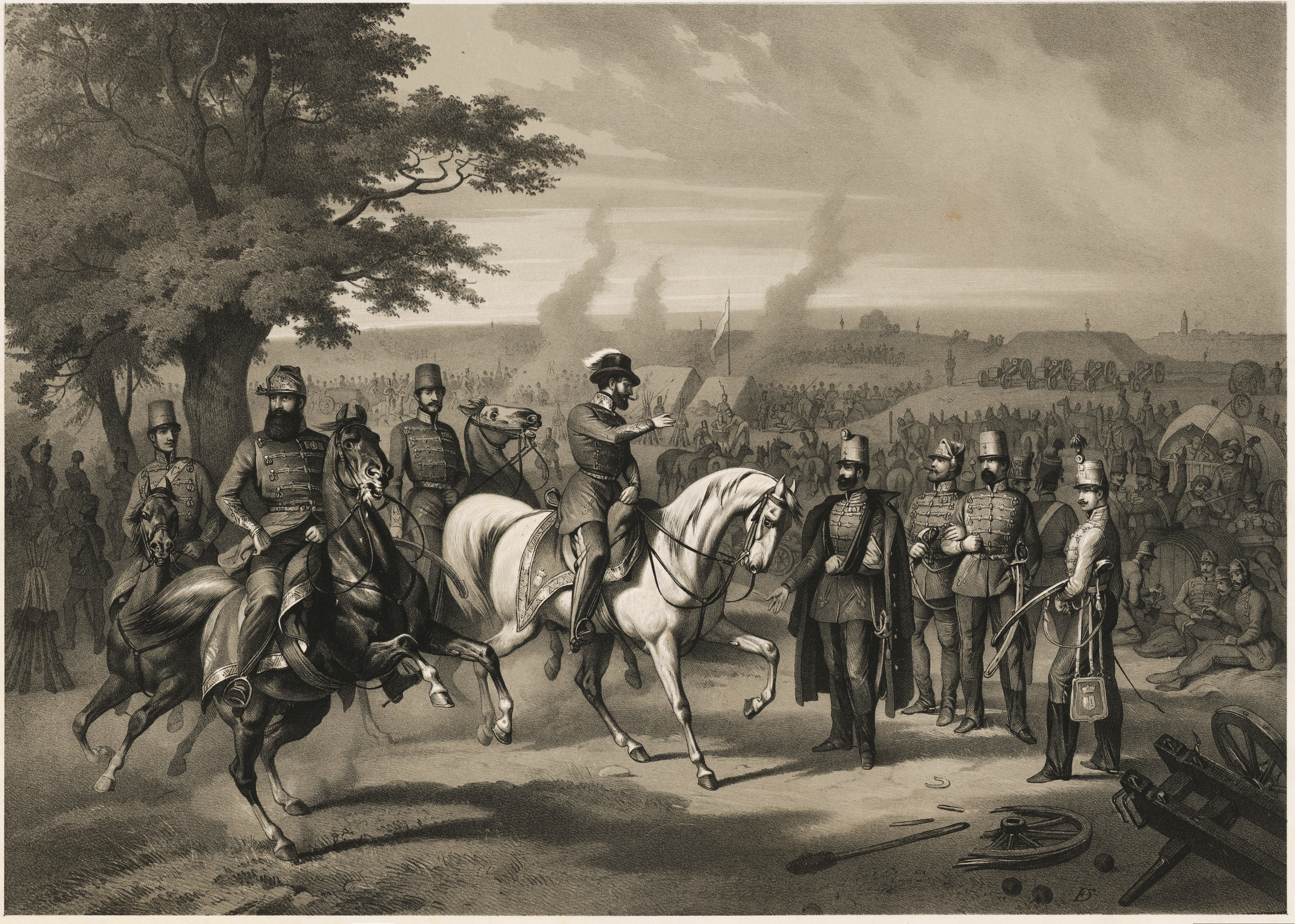
Hungarian camp at Komárom in the April of 1849, with György Klapka and János Damjanich in the forefront

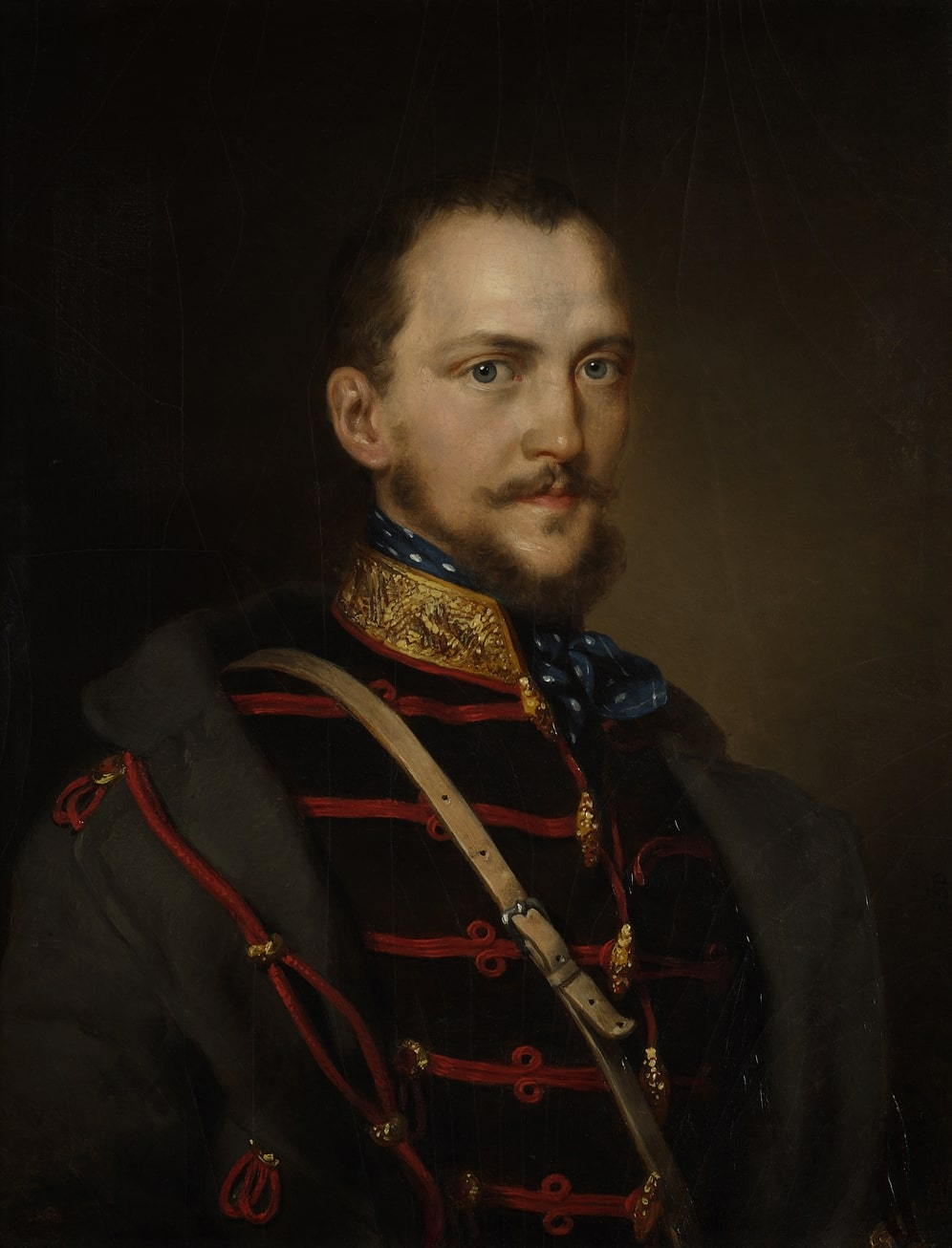
Artúr Görgei

At the start of March, in Transylvania, together with the Székely troops, Lieutenant General Józef Bem had 17 000 soldiers and 42 guns. In southern Hungary, around Szeged, the IV. (Bácska) corps led by General Mór Perczel prepared to attack the Serbs with 8,500 soldiers and 30 guns. The Austrian fortresses in Banat (Temesvár and Arad) were surrounded by the V. (Banat) Corps led by General Károly Vécsey with 6000 soldiers, 24 field cannons and an unknown number of siege guns. In northeastern Hungary, troops of the 19th Division were stationed with 3,500 soldiers and 8 guns.

In addition, the following forces defended the Hungarian-controlled fortresses and strongholds. The garrison of Komárom (VIII Corps) consisted of 9,000 soldiers, 6 field pieces, and 200 fortress cannons. The garrison of Pétervárad consisted of 5,000 men and 116 cannons. And two companies of soldiers and 26 guns were defending the Munkács Castle.

The number of reserve troops in formation at the time was 7,000 and 12 guns.

Thus, in total, the Hungarian troops were around 110,000 soldiers and 700 guns.

=== K.u.K. army and its allies ===
Opposing the Hungarian main army on the other bank of the Tisza was the Austrian army led by Field Marshal Alfred Windisch-Grätz, consisting of three corps (I, II, III) and one division (Ramberg - later Götz - division), with a total of 50 500 soldiers and 222 cannons. The Komárom siege corps consisted of 14,133 soldiers and 42 guns. (Note: According to Róbert Hermann, at the beginning of the Spring Campaign Windisch-Grätz had 55 000, and Görgei only 47 000.)

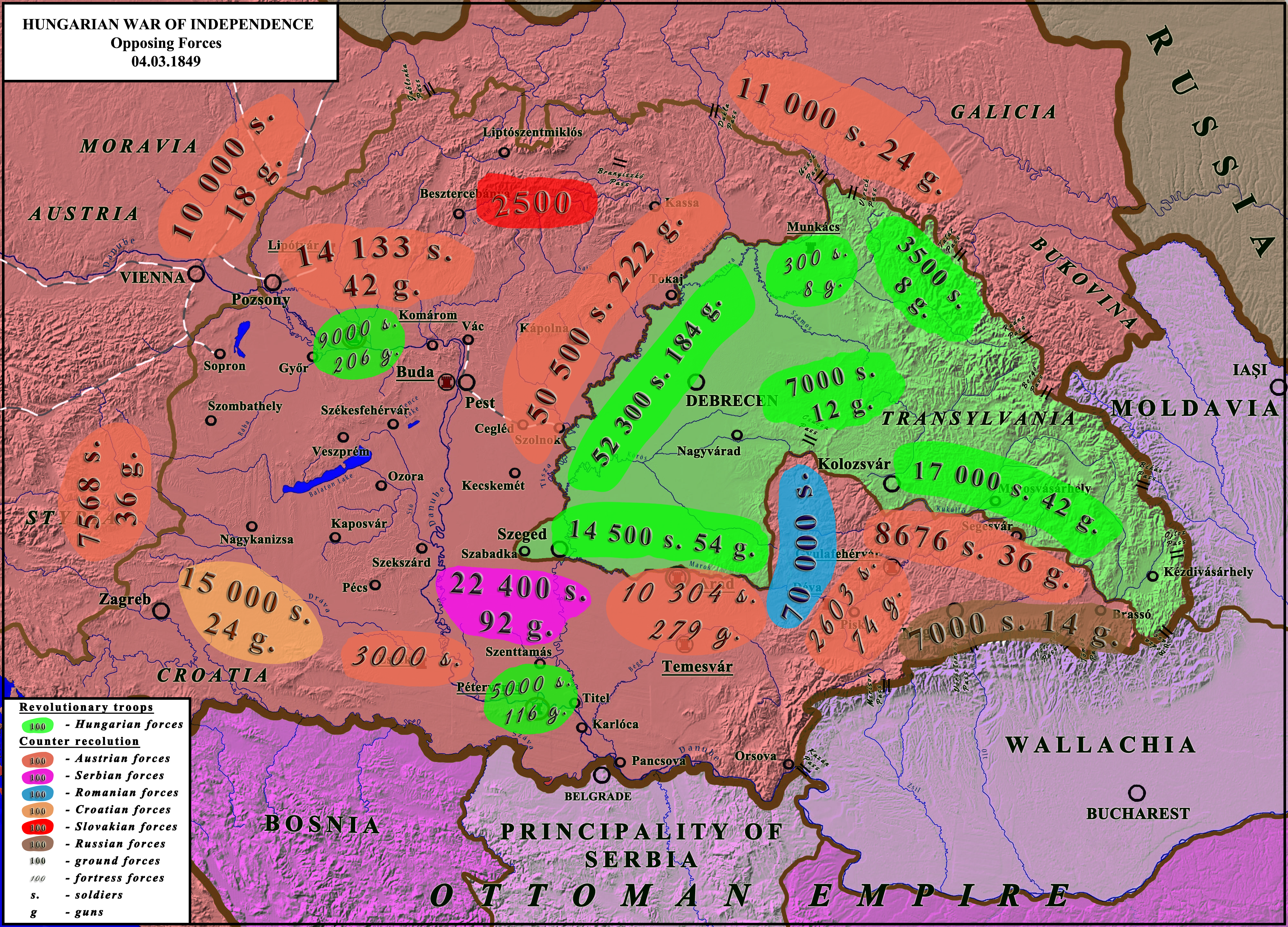
Balance of forces during the Hungarian wars of Independence of 1848-1849 before the start of the Spring Campaign

In Transylvania, Lieutenant General Anton Puchner commanded 8676 soldiers and 36 guns. In addition, since February there had been 7,000 Russian soldiers and 14 artillery pieces in Transylvania, which Puchner could only rely on for defensive fighting. Besides these, there were some 70,000 Romanian national guards and militias in southern and western Transylvania.

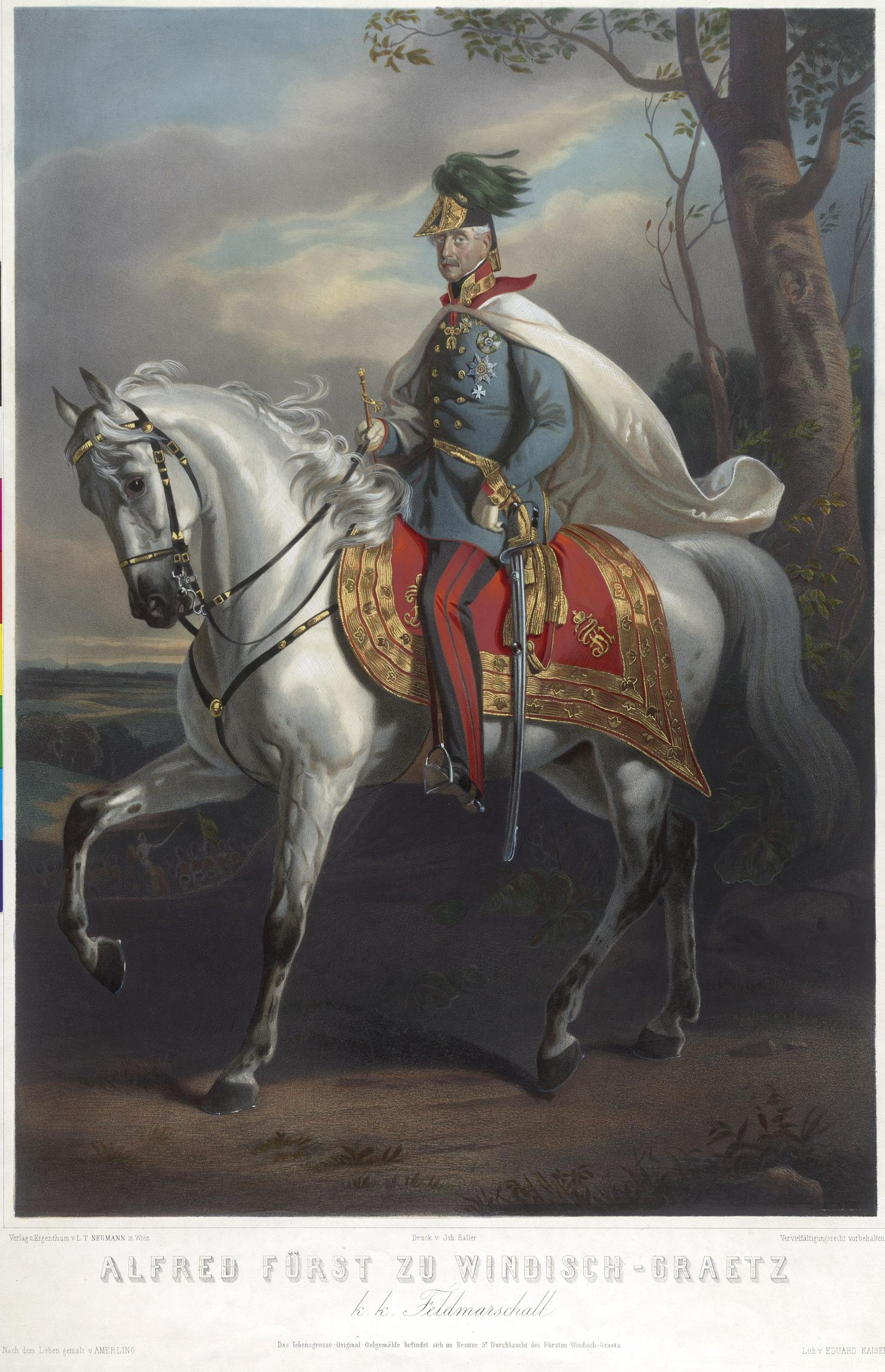
Alfred zu Windisch-Graetz

In the Banat and Bácska regions, the mobile Serb-Austrian forces (those who were not stationed as garrisons in fortresses) on 14 February consisted of 29 402 soldiers and 92 guns. However, at the beginning of March, the Serbian volunteers, called Servians (6-7000 men) returned to the Principality of Serbia because the Austrian command had forbidden them to plunder. At the same time, not all parts of the Olmütz constitution were in concordance with the Serb national aspirations, and this too contributed to the return of the Serbian volunteers. To make up for the shortfall caused by their departure, the Styrian-Croatian corps was sent to support the Serb troops in the area of Pétervárad. It consisted of 7568 soldiers and 36 guns. This increased the number of Imperial troops in the south, consisting of Serbs, Austrians, and Croats, to about 30,000 soldiers and 128 guns.

In addition to these, the following troops were in the castles controlled by the Imperials. In Transylvania: Gyulafehervar's garrison consisted of 2,523 soldiers and 71 guns, and the small hilltop castle of Déva with 80 soldiers and 3 cannons.

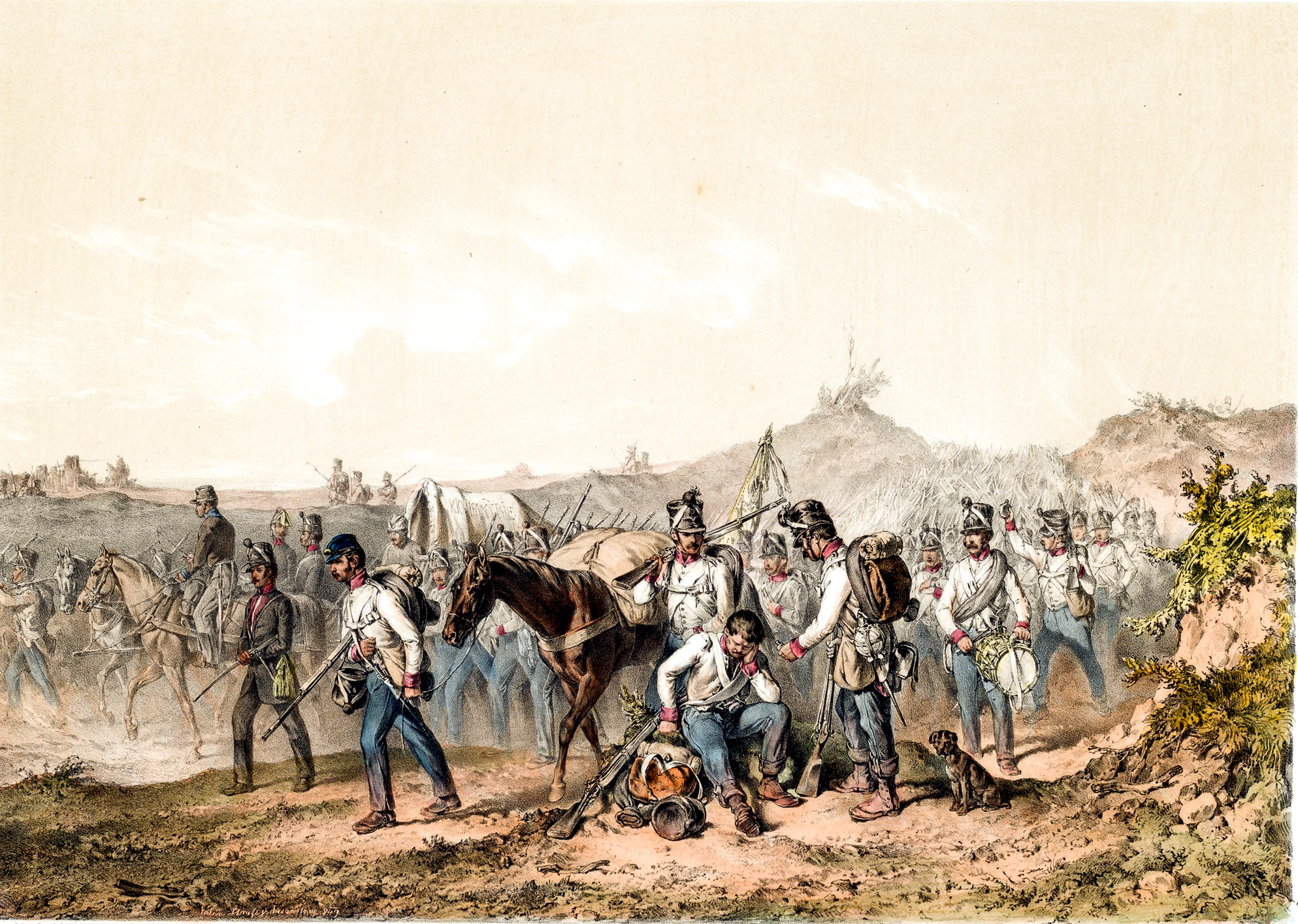
Marching Austrian soldiers in Hungary (Josef Anton Strassgschwandtner)

In the South three castles were in imperial hands: Temesvár, Arad, and Eszék. Temesvár had a garrison of 8851 men and 213 guns, Arad had 1453 defenders and 66 guns, while in Eszék there were 3,000 soldiers and an unknown number of guns.

In addition to these troops, new imperial troops were sent to stop the Hungarian army, which had won a series of victories in April. In mid-April, 10,000 troops and 18 guns under the command of Lieutenant-General Ludwig von Wohlgemuth, gathered in Austria, Styria, Moravia, and Bohemia, arrived in western Hungary. At the same time, the Vogel Corps, consisting of 11,000 soldiers and 24 guns, was sent to Northern Hungary from Galicia.

Thus, in total, the K.u.K. troops (including also the Serbs from Banat and Bácska) and their nationality and Russian allies were around 119,216 soldiers and 781 guns. The Russian troops from Transylvania were 7000 soldiers and 14 cannons. Around 70,000 Romanian militias also helped the Austrians in Transylvania. So we can say that before the start of the Spring Campaign, the counter-revolutionary camp was much more numerous than the Hungarians. And to these in April added another 21 000 K.u.K. soldiers and 42 guns during April 1849.

== Campaign attempt of Antal Vetter ==
After Dembiński's replacement, on 8 March 1849, Kossuth appointed Major General Antal Vetter as commander-in-chief of the Hungarian army. Vetter's operational plan was to send Görgei's VII Corps towards Miskolc, while he with the other three corps wanted to cross the Tisza at Cibakháza and try to attack the enemy's flank. The Hungarian main army crossed the Tisza on the Cibakháza bridge on 16–17 March. In the meantime Windisch-Grätz also moved his troops towards Cibakháza. On the 18th Vetter received the news that 40,000 Imperial soldiers were stationed in Nagykőrös. As a result, the Hungarian military council decided to retreat Tisza through Cibakháza. On 18–19 March, the Hungarian main forces returned to the left bank of the Tisza and marched northwards.

Meanwhile, Görgei crossed the Tisza at Tokaj, and headed west. In the meantime, Vetter fell ill, and another commander-in-chief had to be appointed. At first, Kossuth thought that he would be the commander-in-chief, but the generals dissuaded him. The majority of the army wanted Görgei to be appointed commander-in-chief, and therefore Kossuth was forced to put him as temporary main commander on 30 March. The appointment was not officialized, but after Görgei took over the Ministry of War in May 1849, he remained de facto the commander-in-chief of the Hungarian army until 1 July 1849.

== Capture of Transylvania ==
At the beginning of March, Bem again turned against Nagyszeben, the headquarters of the imperial army led by Puchner. On 2–3 March, Bem was defeated by Puchner in the Battle of Medgyes, and retreated to Segesvár. Puchner thought that finally, the opportunity to deliver a definitive blow to Bem had come, and he sent his troops on several routes towards Segesvár trying to cut all the escape routes and close Bem's army in the town. Only the road from Segesvár to Nagyszeben was left unsecured, for a short time.

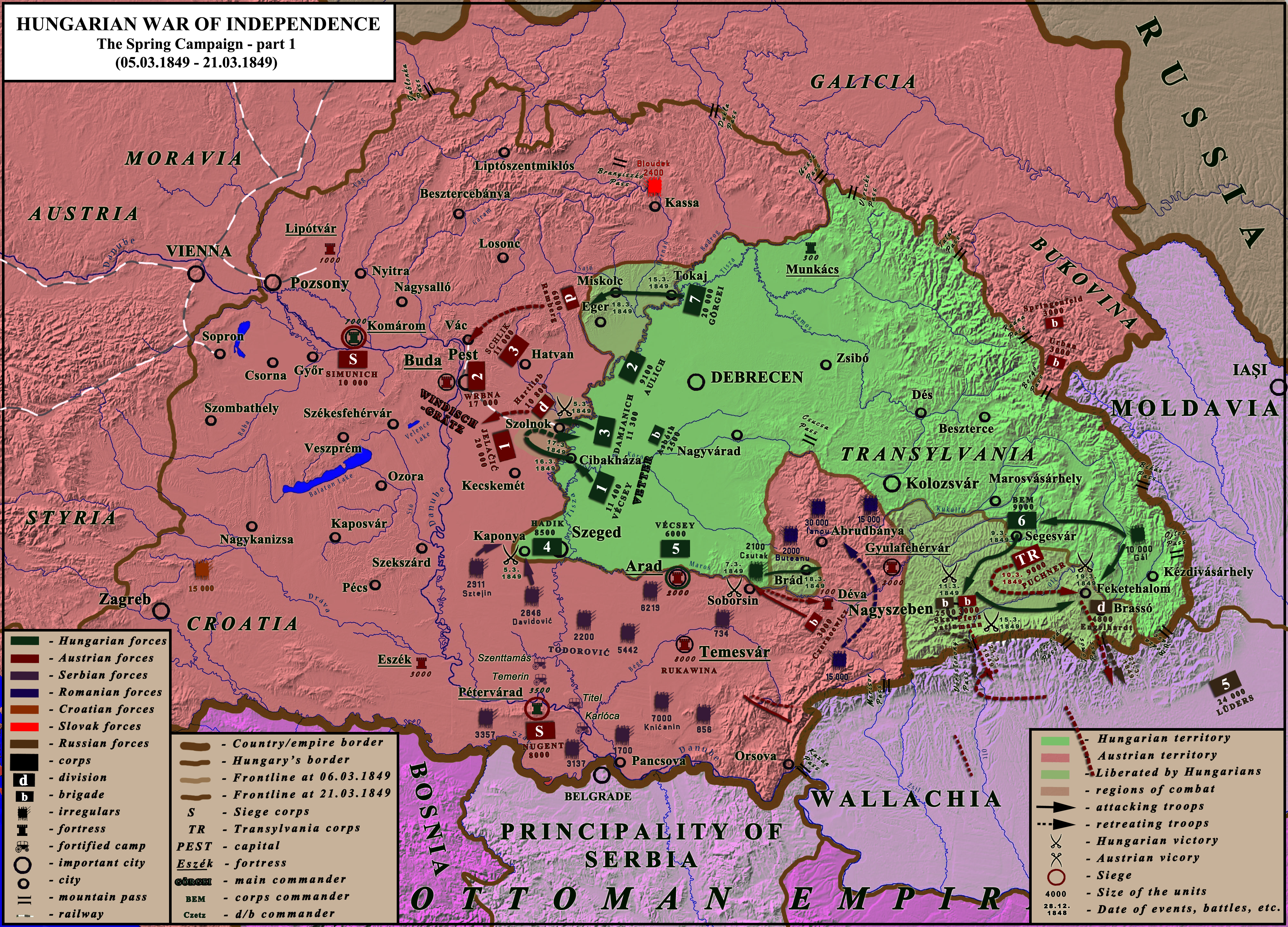
The Military Situation in Hungary between 05.03.1849-21.03.1849

Bem immediately recognized his big chance, and on 9 March, he left Segesvár and went in a forced march with his troops on that route to Nagyszeben. On 11 March, in the Second Battle of Nagyszeben, he defeated the Russian-Austrian garrison led by the Tsarist Colonel Grigory Skariatin, who came out from the city to face him and then started to besiege Nagyszeben, taking it by nightfall.

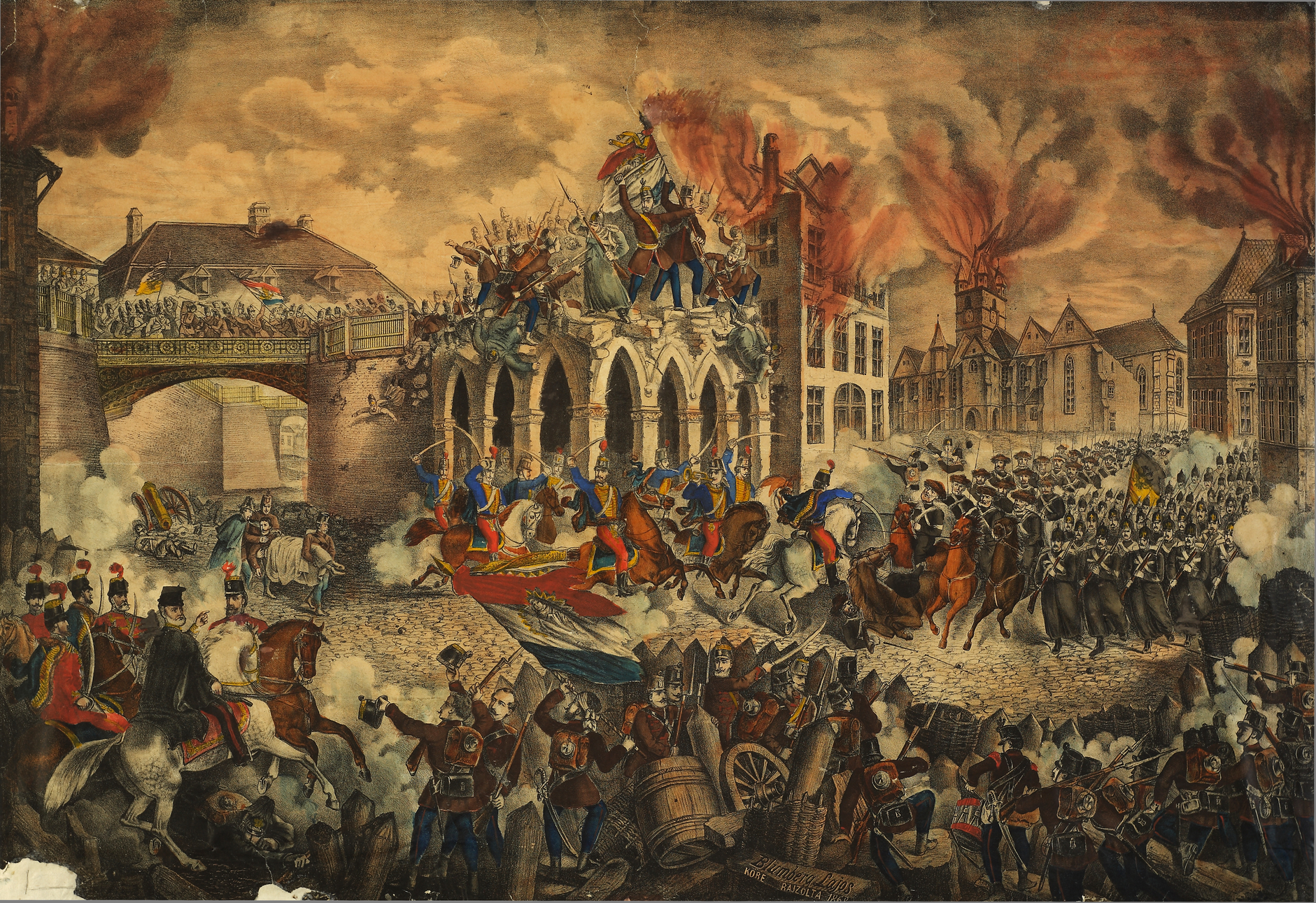
Second Battle of Nagyszeben on 11 March 1849 (by Lajos Blumberg)

Puchner who understood late, that Bem played a game of cat and mouse with him, rushed with his troops, which were surrounding the empty Segesvár, towards Nagyszeben, but before he reached it, on 12 March in Alzen (Rom. Alțina), he was informed that his headquarters had fallen. The fall of Nagyszeben was a huge psychological blow to the Imperial forces: lieutenant-general Puchner resigned his command in favor of General József Kalliány. The Imperials still had a much larger army than Bem had, and the new commander-in-chief was considering retaking Nagyszeben, but when General Engelhardt, the leader of the Russian troops defending Brassó, warned him that a force of about 10,000 men was approaching from Székely Land, he was forced to abandon this plan. Colonel János Czetz received orders from Bem to march towards Brassó. On 18 March, Czetz's troops inflicted a final defeat on Kalliány's army in the Battle of Feketehalom, as a result of which the Austrian and Russian armies fled Transylvania for Wallachia. Czetz captured Brassó on 20 March, while Bem drove out the rest of the enemy army through the Vöröstorony Pass. By the end of March, Bem had cleared the whole of Transylvania of them. Only the fortress of Gyulafehervár and the small castle of Déva on top of a mountain remained in the hands of the K.u.K. troops and part of the West Transylvanian Mountains in the hands of the Romanian rebels, led by Avram Iancu.

On 27 May, the fortress of Déva also surrendered to the Hungarians, and a siege ring was drawn around the castle of Gyulafehervár.

=== Fights against the Romanians retreated to the Transylvanian Ore Mountains ===
The victories of General Bem and the withdrawal of the Austrian and Russian armies from Transylvania forced the Romanian insurgents led by Avram Iancu to retreat to the well-defended Ore Mountains in western Transylvania.

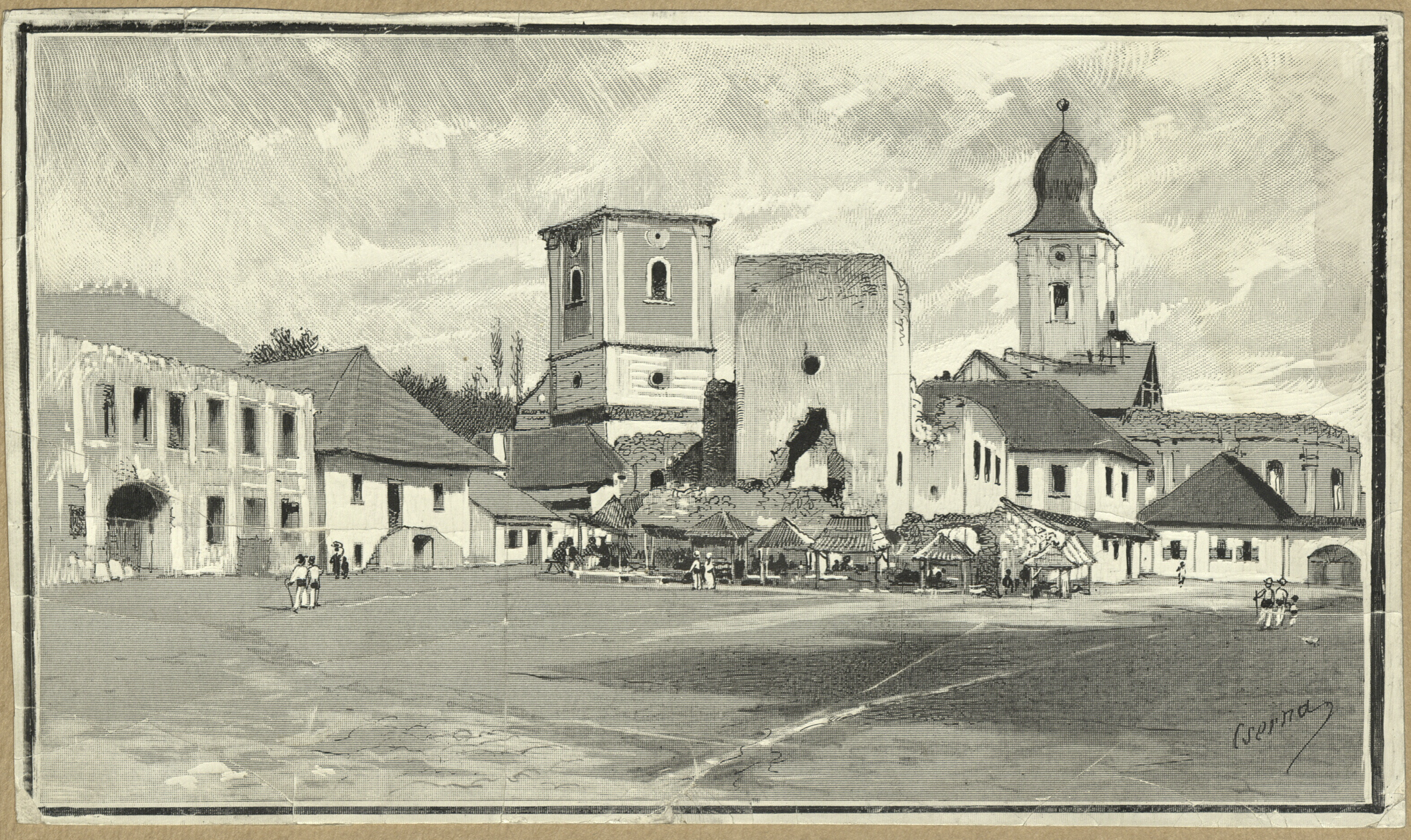
Abrudbánya after the destructions caused by the Romanian attacks in May 1849 (by Károly Cserna)

With around 70 000 armed men in total, they posed a serious threat to the Hungarians. Starting with October 1848, Avram Iancu's Romanian insurgents gained a gruesome reputation mainly for the mass killing of innocent Hungarian civilians throughout southern Transylvania, thus the Hungarian army could not take their threat lightly. However, the Hungarian successes in March led the Romanians to show a willingness to compromise. Ioan Dragoș, a Romanian MP in the Hungarian Parliament from Bihar County, tried to mediate a truce between the two sides, when Imre Hatvani, the new leader of the Zaránd brigade, with 1109 poorly armed national guards and guerillas (some of them had only spears), 52 hussars, and 3 small caliber cannons, appeared on 6 May in Abrudbánya, the center of the Romanians from the Ore Mountains. In response, the Romanians broke off all negotiations, and on the 9th they laid siege to Abrudbánya, from which Hatvani and his troops withdrew, but in the heavy fighting 150 men of the Zaránd Brigade were killed. Hatvani, on Kossuth's orders, repeated the attack on 15 May with 1300 men. He reoccupied Abrudbánya, and then the Romanians' overwhelming superiority forced him to flee again. The Romanians took revenge for Hatvani's attacks by massacring 5,000 Hungarian civilians living in Abrudbánya, Verespatak, and the surrounding villages.

The Romanians tried to launch attacks from the mountains. One such attack took place on 30 May against the Hungarian army besieging Gyulafehérvár, led by Avram Iancu himself with 7-8000 men, but was repulsed by the Hungarian troops.

== Capture of Southern Hungary ==
At the beginning of March, Serb troops from Bácska launched an attack on Szabadka and Szeged in an attempt to establish a link with the main Austrian army, which was stationed in the Danube-Tisza interfluve. However, they were severely defeated in the Battle of Kaponya on 5 March.

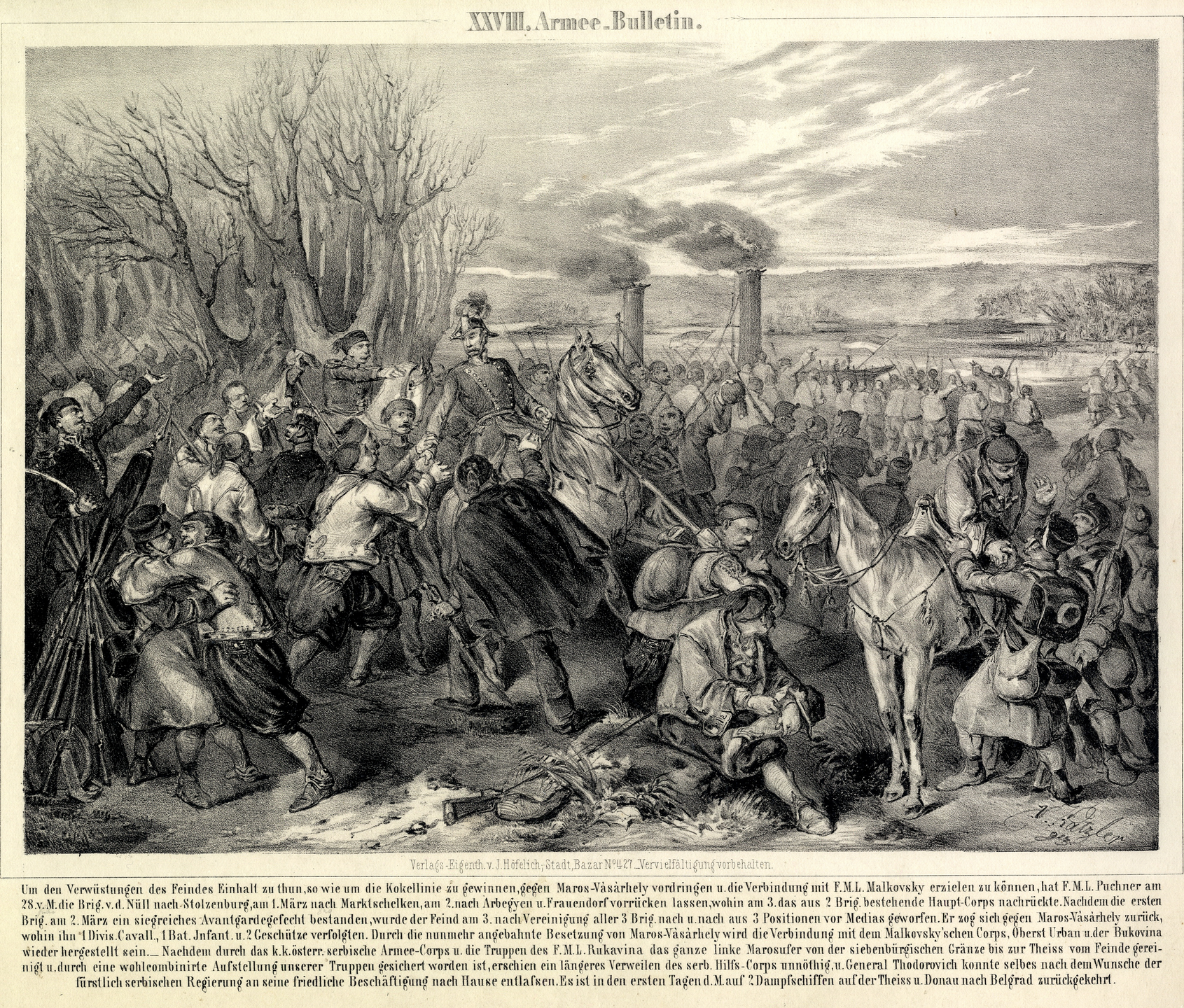
The Serbian volunteers return to Serbia at the start of March 1849 - Winzenz Katzler

At the same time as the capture of Transylvania, the military situation in Bácska and Banat took a favorable turn. On 15 March 1849, General Mór Perczel took command of the Bácska troops, i.e. the IV Corps. After several victorious battles, Perczel first relieved the blockade of Pétervárad from the north and then made an unsuccessful attempt to break the blockade from the south too.

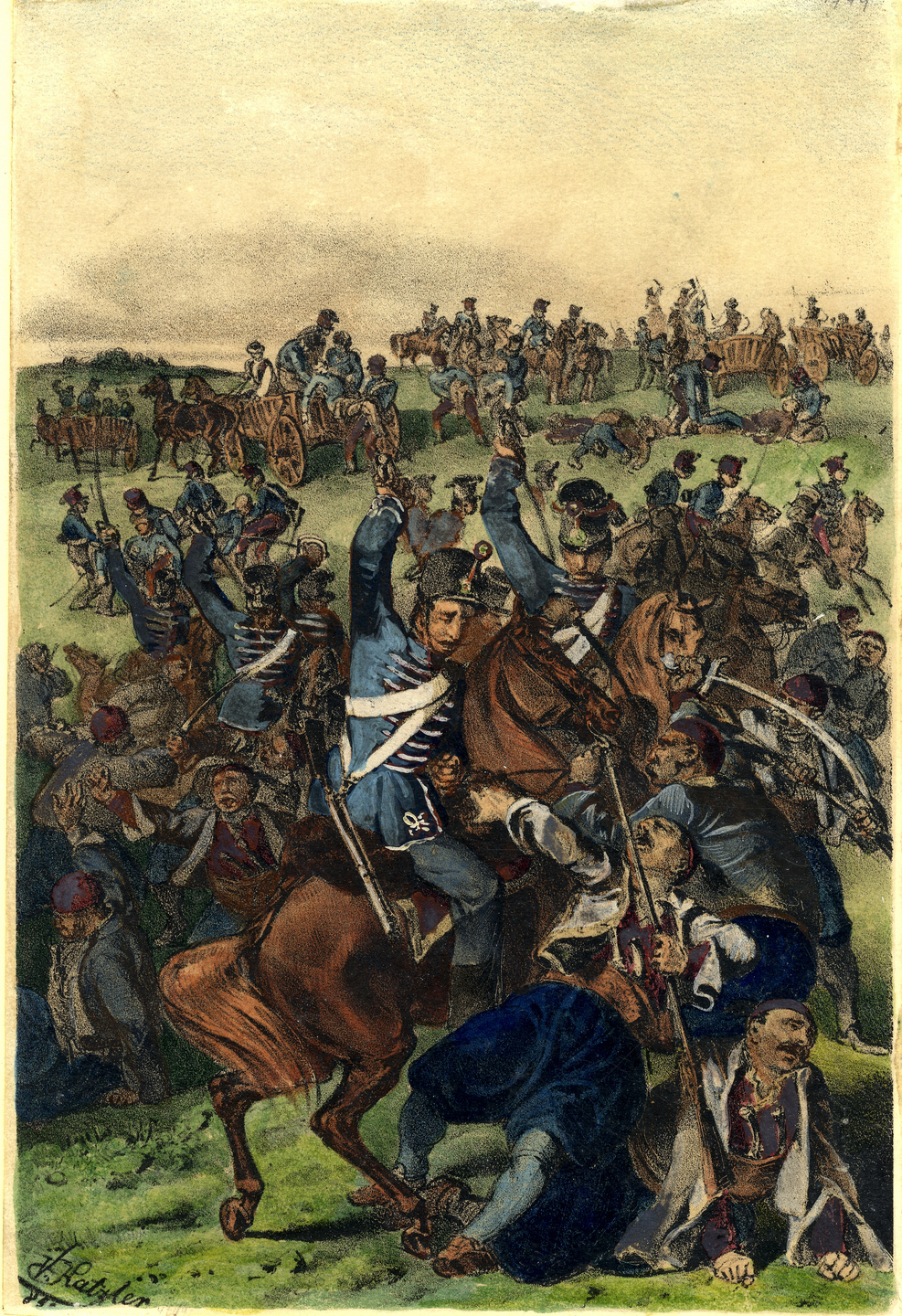
Battle of Vilova 26 May 1849 between Serbs and Hungarians - Winzenz Katzler

Then he turned back and brought reinforcements from Szeged. On 3 April he attacked and captured the Serb fortified camp of Szenttamás, which had been besieged unsuccessfully three times by Hungarian troops. On 7 April, he broke through the Roman Entrenchments. On 12 April he attempted to take the heavily fortified Titel plateau from the Serbs but was repulsed in the First Battle of Titel. Then Perczel brought in new reinforcements and on 22 April he crossed the Tisza at Zenta. On 29 April, he fought an undecided battle with Kuzman Todorović's troops in the Battle of Melence, after which both sides retreated. The next day Perczel took Nagybecskerek.

In the meantime, Bem's army left Transylvania, and on 16 April pushed into Banat from the east. He took Karánsebes and Lugos, then met Perczel at Zsombolya. In the meantime, the Imperial Corps, driven out of Transylvania in March, under the command of Lieutenant General Ignaz Malkowski, entered Banat at Orsova. Bem and Perczel agreed that Perczel would continue to pursue Todorović, while Bem would turn against Malkowski. Perczel beat the Serb troops in the Battle of Uzdin on 7 May and then occupied Pancsova on 10 May. In the battle, the German-Serb Corps from Southern Hungary broke into pieces and retreated in different directions. In the meantime, Bem quickly sent his brigades to outflank Malkowski's corps, which, fearing an encirclement, left the country, back into Wallachia

At the same time, there were also major changes in the blockade of the Austrian fortresses from Banat. At the beginning of April, Major General Károly Vécsey took command of the troops besieging Arad, and by 25 April he built a canal to cut off the garrison from the outside world.

Meanwhile, at the end of April, Bem's troops took up observation positions around the fortress of Temesvár. From Bem, Vécsey's troops took over the observation of the fortress, and Vécsey put the fortress under regular siege.

At the end of May, except the fortresses of Arad and Temesvár -both encircled by the Hungarian forces - all Banat was in Hungarian hands, while, except the Titel plateau, all Bácska was captured.

== Campaign of the Hungarian main army ==
General György Klapka elaborated the operational plan of the Spring campaign.

According to the plan, the VII. corps, standing at Hatvan, had to attract there the attention of the K.u.K. commander-in-chief, while the I., II., and III. corps tried to get behind the enemy's main army by a southwestern detour. The plan was risky because if the imperialists discovered that only a small part of the Hungarian army was at Hatvan, they could easily crush it and cut off the supply lines of the other 3 corps.

=== Gödöllő-Operation ===
As a prelude to the spring campaign, on 25 March, a Hungarian detachment of 450 soldiers, led by Lieutenant Colonel Lajos Beniczky made a Raid on Losonc, driving the K.u.K. troops out of the town with heavy losses.

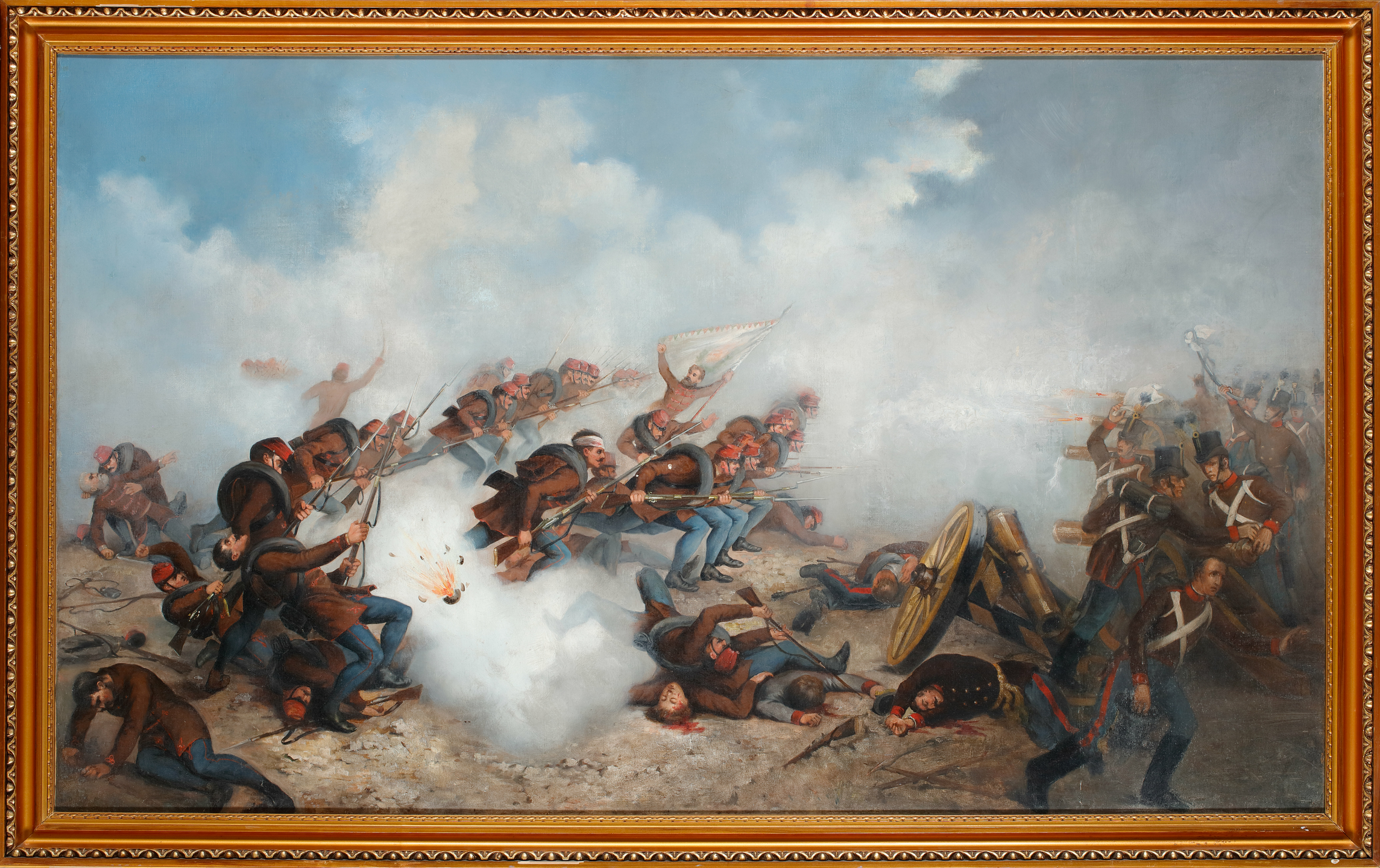
Second Battle of Szolnok on 5 March 1849

The leader of the Austrian garrison of Losonc, Colonel Almásy, reported that he was attacked by a Hungarian army of 6000 men, from which Field Marshal Windisch-Grätz concluded that a huge Hungarian army was from the north advancing towards Komárom. He therefore sent troops northwards to avert this false threat. In this way he weakened the imperial troops in front of Pest shortly before the Hungarian main army attacked.

The first serious clash between the two main armies took place in the Battle of Hatvan on 2 April. Franz Schlik, one of the best generals of the imperial army, was defeated by the VII Corps led by Colonel András Gáspár, creating the belief in the confused Windisch-Grätz that the Hungarian main army would attack Pest frontally.

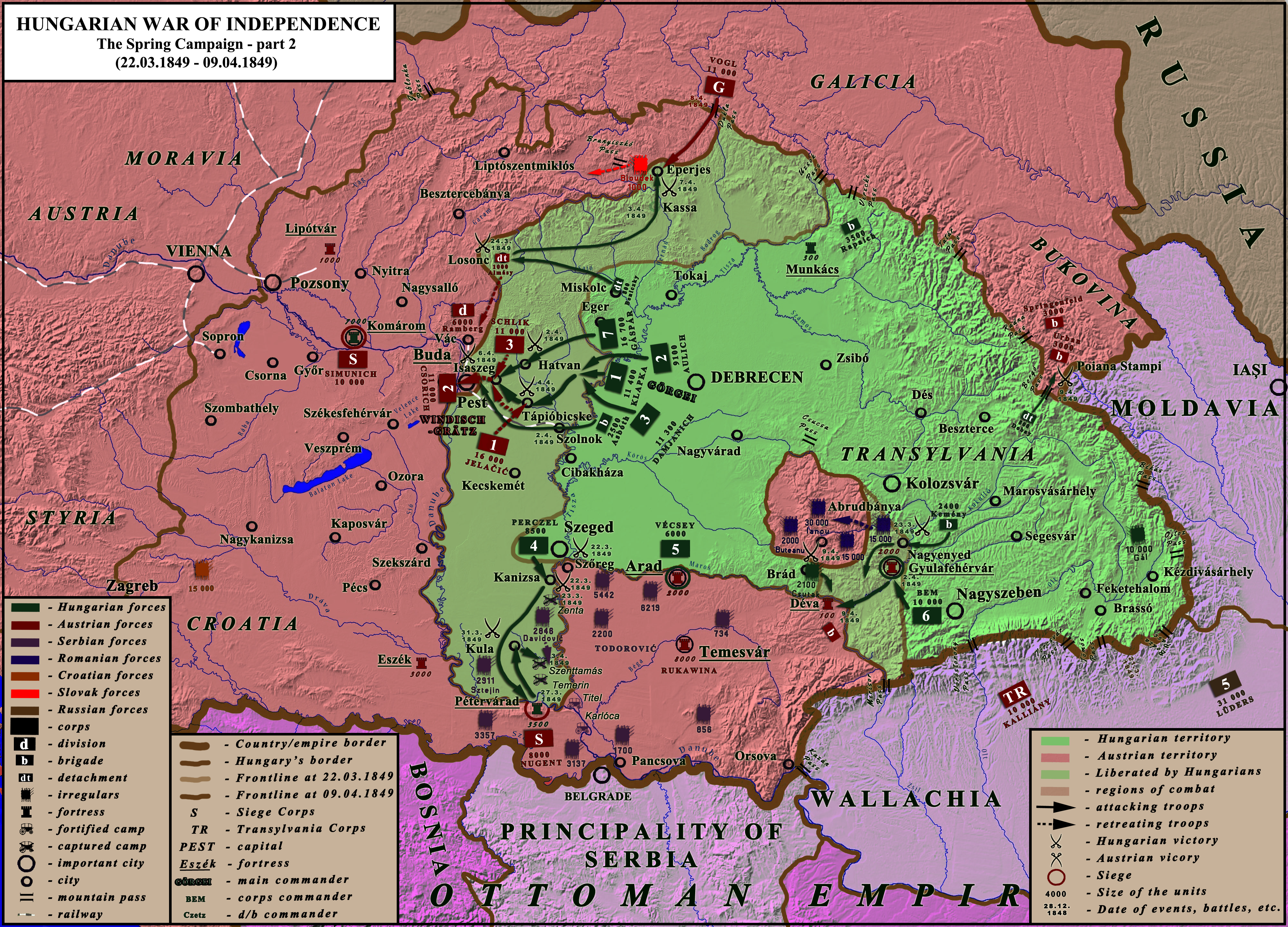
The Military Situation in Hungary between 22.03.1849-09.04.1849

Meanwhile, the corps led by János Damjanich, György Klapka, and Lajos Aulich (I, II, III) moved towards Pest on the detour from the south route through Jászság. On 4 April, Klapka's troops clashed with Jelačić's rearguard in the Battle of Tápióbicske. Klapka's troops fled, but Görgei arrived on the scene and restored order, while Damjanich's corps took back the bridge over the Tápió with a bayonet charge, and then drove the border guards out of the village. With the irresponsible attack against Tápióbicske at the start of the battle, Klapka revealed the intentions of the Hungarian army. Windisch-Grätz, however, was not properly informed about the battle and because of this, he still did not know the whereabouts of the Hungarian main forces.

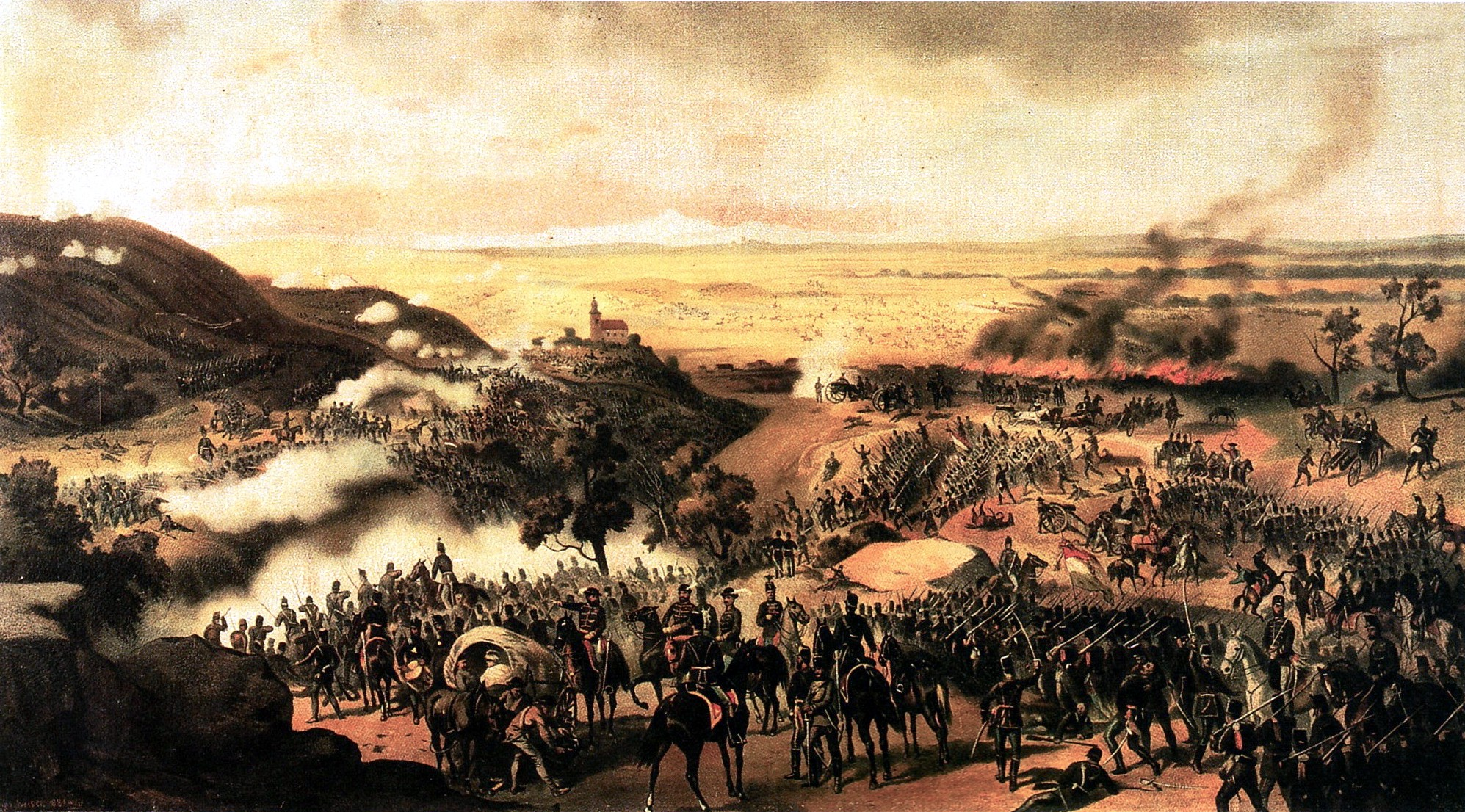
Battle of Isaszeg

For this reason, on 5 April he sent the I. (Jelačić) Corps on a forced reconnaissance in the direction of the Zagyva. The reconnaissance made it certain to him that the Hungarian main force was not at Hatvan, but he still could not find out whether the main force was trying to encircle him from the north or the south. In the former case, he was threatened by the danger of the Hungarian relief attempt of Komárom, and in the latter by the cutting off of the possibility of the K.u.K. army retreat towards Pest. He, therefore, assigned Schlik's corps to Gödöllő, Jelačić's to Isaszeg, and Wrbna's to Vác, and also subordinated to the latter Lieutenant General Georg Heinrich von Ramberg's division stationed at Balassagyarmat. Two brigades stayed in the capital and one occupied Monor. The imperial troops thus stretched over a very large front, some 54 km long and 30 km deep, which made it impossible to concentrate these troops in a single day in the case of an attack of the enemy. So when he faced the Hungarian main army in the Battle of Isaszeg on 6 April, he could only gather there half of his troops. The imperial army still proved to be a serious opponent. Klapka's wavering troops had to be stopped by Görgei again, and it was only through the perseverance of Damjanich's honvéd soldiers and the self-initiated action of Lajos Aulich that the battle between the two main armies brought a Hungarian victory.

=== Relieve of Komárom ===
At Gödöllő on 7 April, the Hungarian command drew up a new operation plan, based, in the same way as the former, on feigning an attack from the front, while bypassing the enemy. The essence of this was to leave Lajos Aulich's II Corps behind in front of Pest

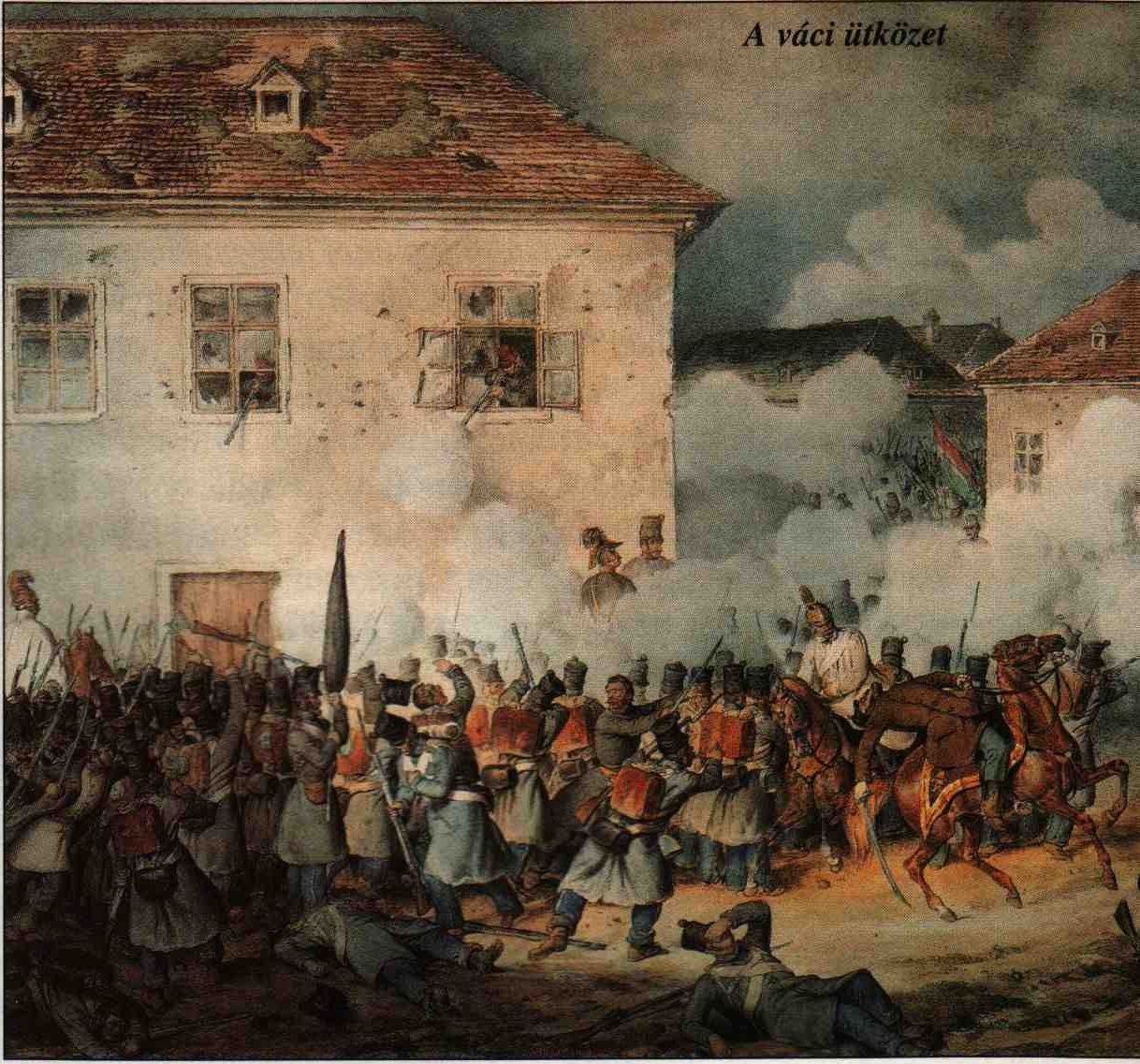
Christian Götz's wounding in the First Battle of Vác

this force had to be soon joined

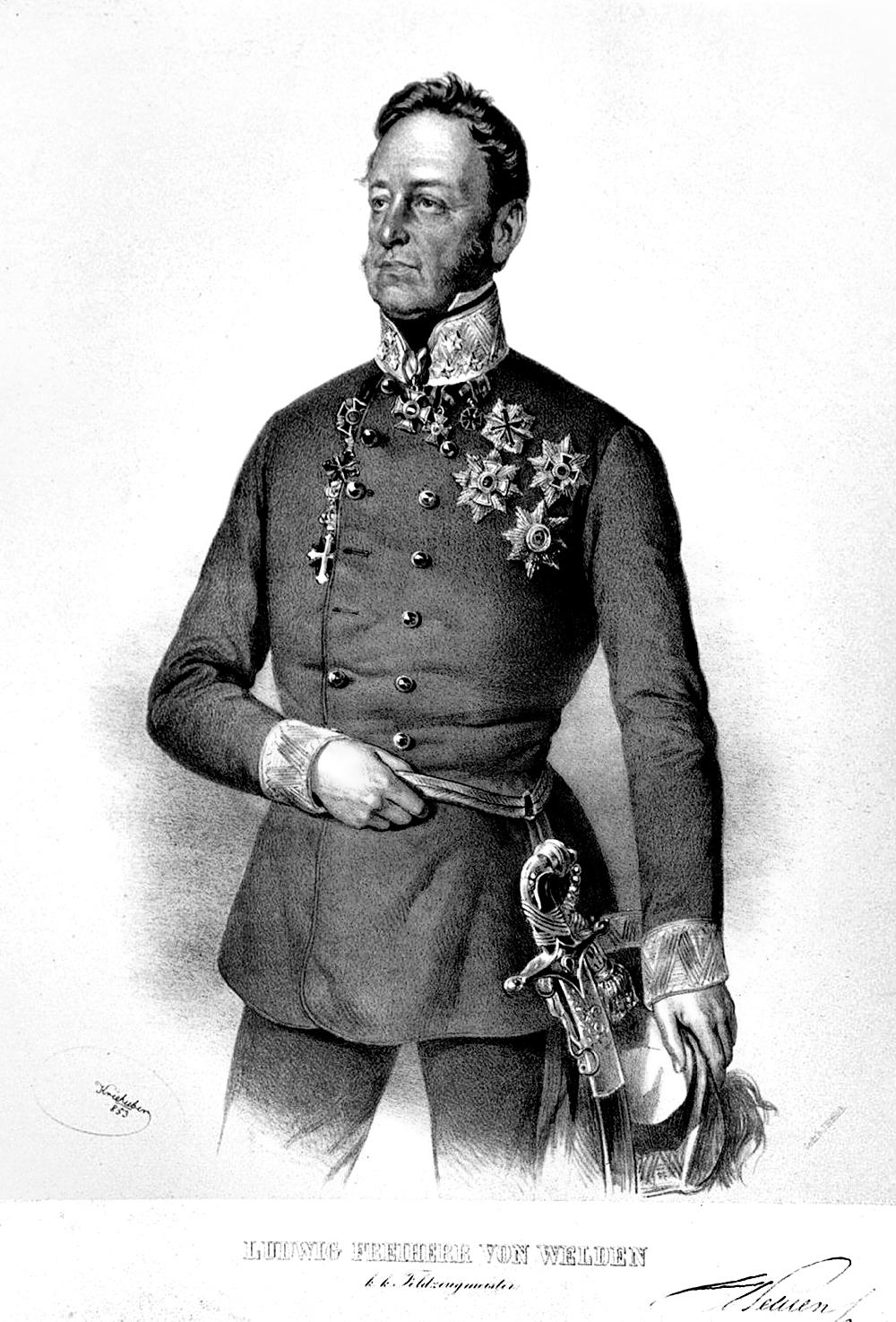
Ludwig von Welden

from the north by the Kmety Division which belonged to the VII Corps, after it covered the departure towards the north, of the I and III Corps and the two remaining divisions of the VII Corps. The I and III Corps had to take Vác, then together with the two remaining divisions of the VII Corps had to march towards the Garam. The task of the II Corps and the 12th Division was then to make it appear that the Hungarian main forces were still in front of Pest by launching deceptive operations. In the meantime, the Hungarian main forces had to cross the Garam and break the siege blockade around Komárom from the left bank of the Danube. Then after crossing to the right bank of the Danube, they had to break the siege blockade also from the south. Then, the enemy would have been left with two choices: either evacuate the capitals and retreat towards Vienna, or risk being surrounded by the Hungarian main army in the vicinity of Buda.

Indeed, in the second phase of the attack, the Hungarian troops in front of the capital, led by General Lajos Aulich, with fake attacks deceived the enemy's main force, making it believe that the Hungarian main forces were at Pest. Meanwhile, the Hungarian main troops led by Görgei was heading north. On 10 April, Damjanich's corps occupied Vác from the Ramberg division. After several hours, the enemy commander himself, General Götz, died from the wounds received in this battle.

On 19 April, in the Battle of Nagysalló, the Hungarians found themselves face to face with a newly organized Imperial corps, which had marched into Hungary from Austria, under the command of Ludwig von Wohlgemuth. But the Honvéds, who had already tasted victory several times, had no obstacle to overcome this, and the enemy was crushed, the Hungarians

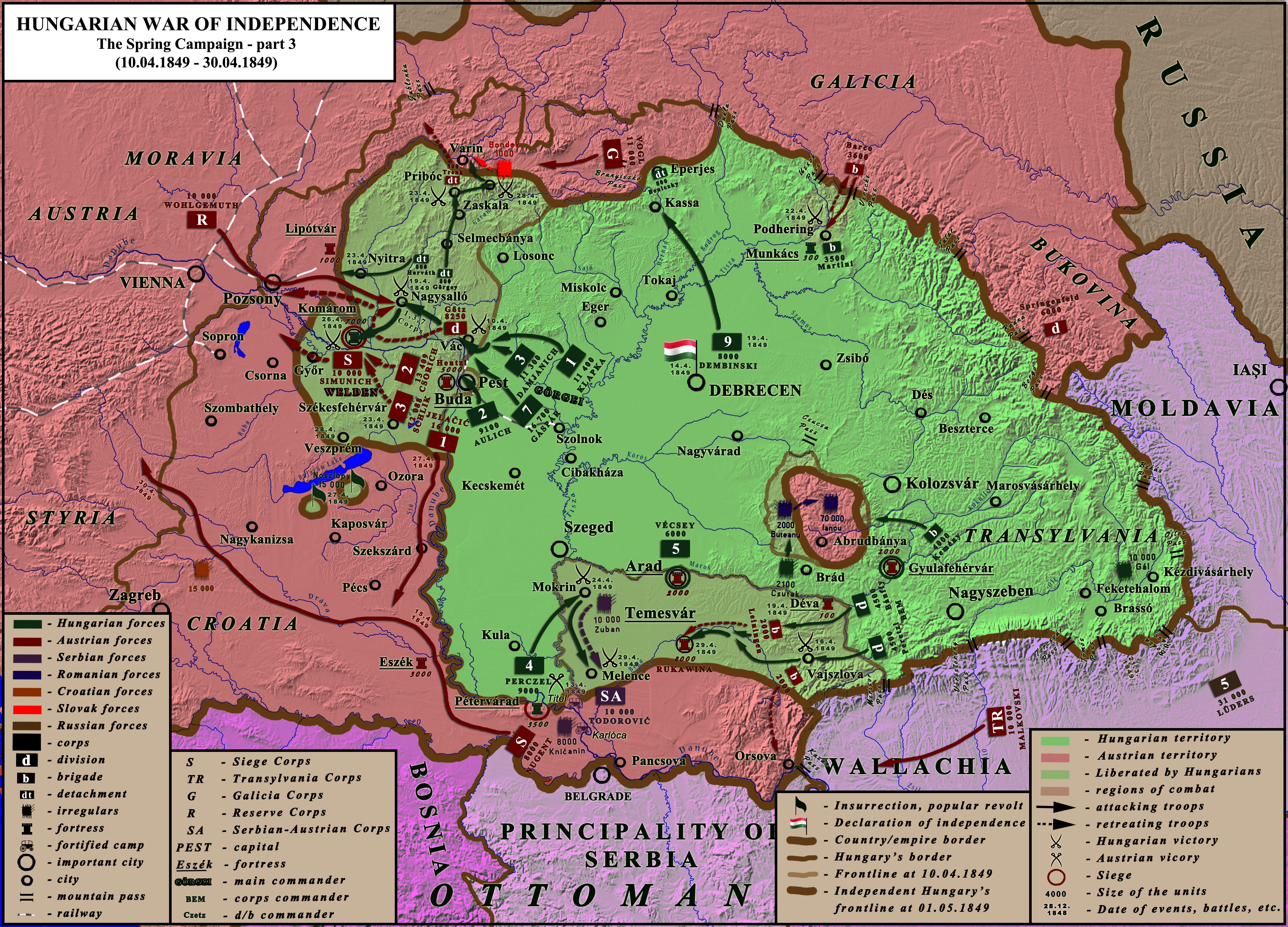
The Military Situation in Hungary between 10.04.1849-30.04.1849

taking more than 1000 prisoners. On the next day, the Hungarian troops won another victory over an imperial brigade in the Battle of Kéménd and then reached Komárom.

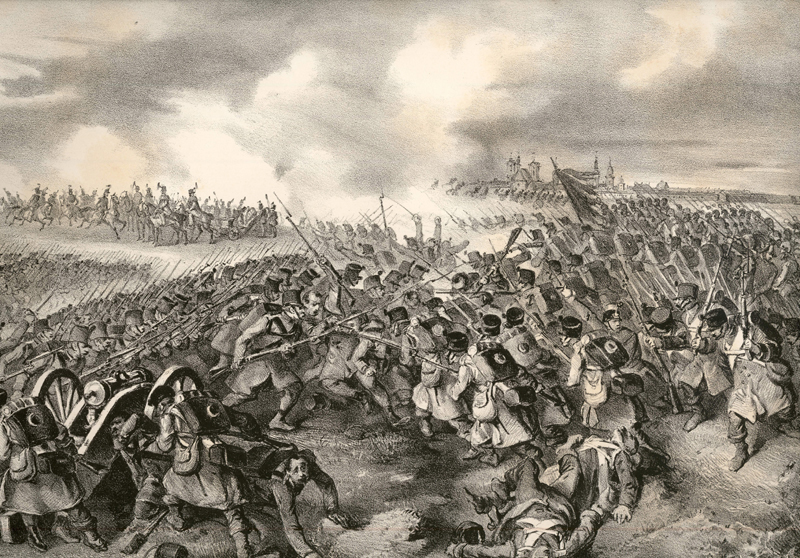
Infantry battle during the Battle of Komárom 26 April 1849

Field Marshal Ludwig von Welden, appointed as Windisch-Grätz's successor, was forced to evacuate Pest, leaving only a garrison to defend the Buda Castle, and Jelačić's corps was sent to the south, while he himself withdrew with the main force to the western border.

Komárom was surrounded in January 1849, and since March it has been constantly besieged and bombarded by imperial troops. Approaching the fortress from the north, Görgei's troops first wiped out the Austrian blockade on the left bank of the Danube, then crossed to the right bank on 26 April on a newly built raft bridge. Thus the First Battle of Komárom begun. In the early hours of the morning, the Hungarians captured the Austrian entrenchments, the siege corps being saved from the total annihilation by Welden’s main army retreating from Pest, which arrived there in the right moment. After the end of the battle, Welden's troops retreated to the western border of Hungary, and Komárom was captured.

=== Proclamation of Hungary's independence ===
After the Hungarian victories in the spring campaign, Kossuth saw the time had come to respond to the Olmütz constitution. On 14 April, the Diet met in Debrecen, and by a public vote, the dethronement of the Habsburg-Lotharingian dynasty and the declaration of Hungary's independence was declared. The Parliament also elected Kossuth as Governor-president, i.e. temporary head of state. The Declaration of Independence formulating these decisions was adopted by Parliament on 19 April.

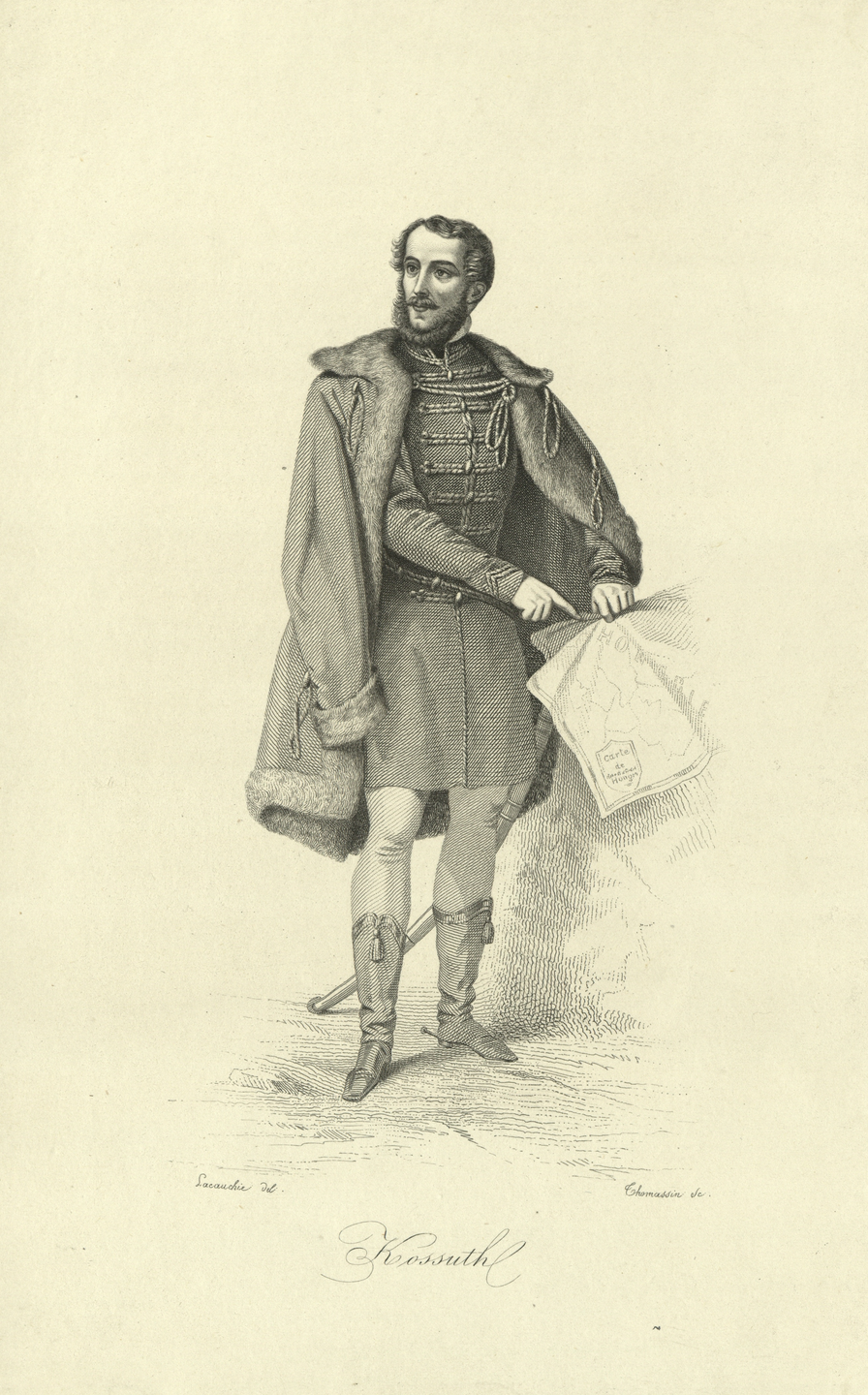
Kossuth as governor of Hungary (Lacauchie, Alexandre)

With this step, Kossuth hoped, among other things, that the Western powers would join Hungary in the war, or at least they would recognize its independence. However, the Western powers saw the Habsburg Empire as more necessary to the European balance of power than accepting an independent Hungary.

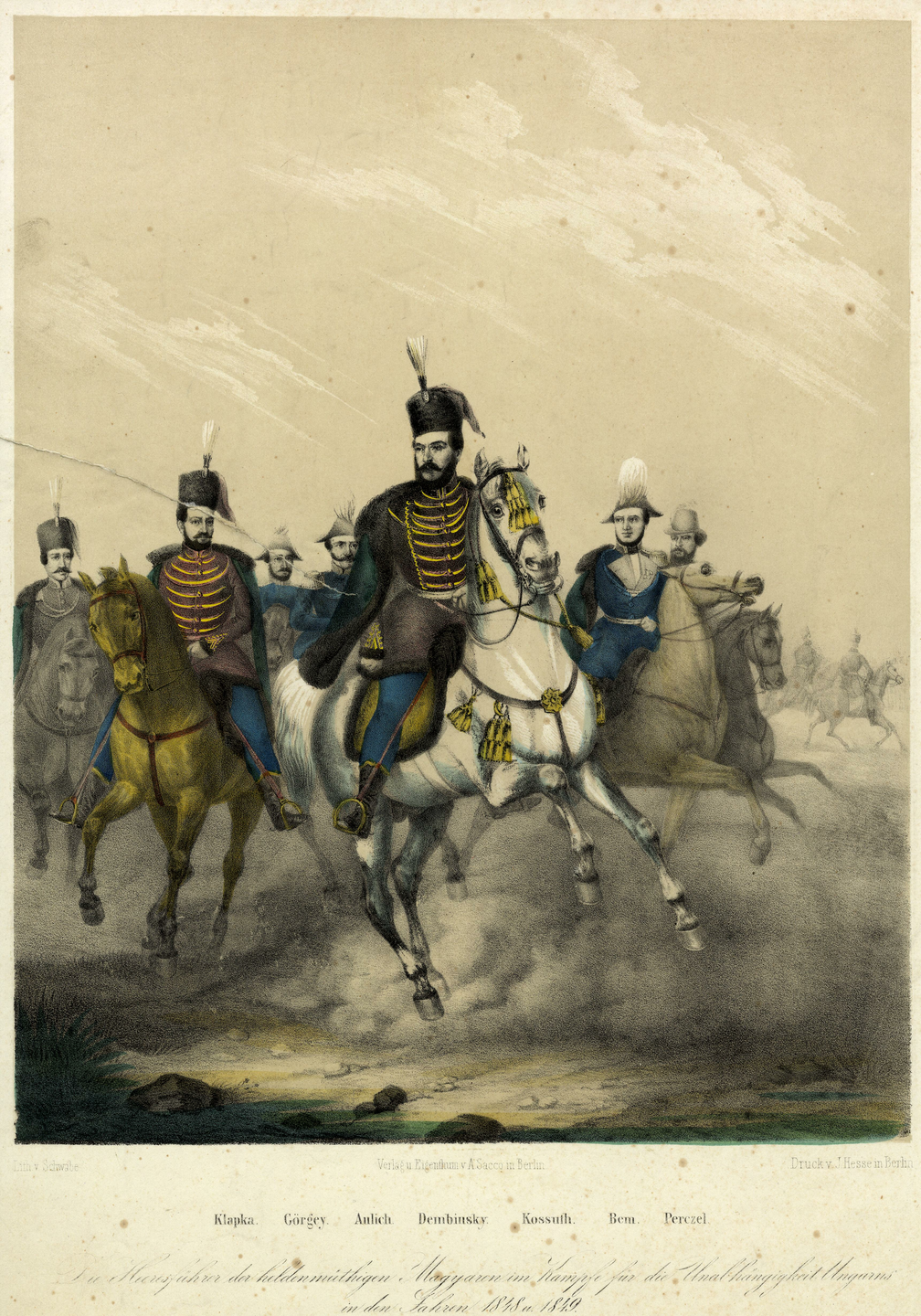
Kossuth (in the forefront) and his Generals (left to rightː Artúr Görgei, György Klapka, Lajos Aulich, Henryk Dembinski, Józef Bem, Mór Perczel

The proclamation of Hungary's independence was disapproved not only by the foreign powers but also by many of the Hungarian generals and other officers. While Józef Bem, the leader of the Army of Transylvania, and Mór Perczel, the commander of the Army of the South, agreed with this, it was greeted with concern and even indignation by some in the Upper Danube Army, the main Hungarian army, which included most foreign-born officers who had only stuck to the Hungarian cause thanks to the Declaration of Vác from 5 January. However, no collective action was taken against the declaration of independence by the dissatisfied officers.

Even so, the fact remains that the declaration's issuance was not fortunate for the unity of the army's officer corps, nor for the unity of those who fought for the Hungarian cause. According to some officers, while Hungary's struggle for the preservation of the Hungarian constitution and the recognition of an independent Hungary within the empire had been legitimate self-defense, with the declaration of independence the war of self-defense lost its legal basis. However, the fact is that since the attack of the Croatian army led by Josip Jelačić in September 1848 and the attack of the imperial army led by General Windisch-Grätz in December 1848, the empire has rejected at least seven public or gestural Hungarian peace offers, and the Olmütz Constitution convinced most loyalist officers that the emperor was not willing to sit down at the negotiating table with the Hungarians at any price, so the declaration of independence was a necessary and legitimate step for which the Hungarians were not to blame.

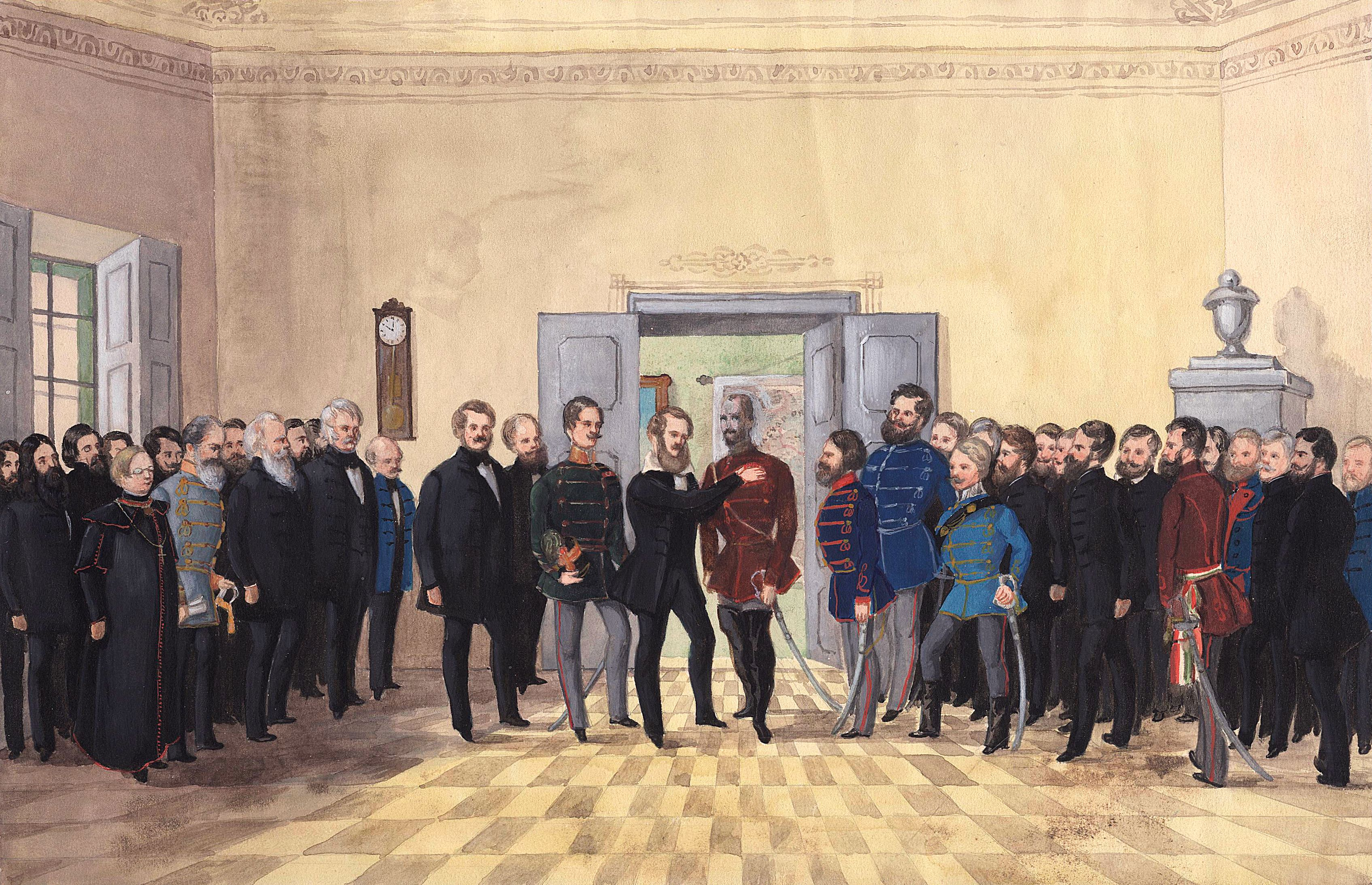
Kossuth decorate Görgei in the Spring of 1849

The Hungarian victories in the spring campaign also prevented mass resignations of the officers, because they created the belief that Hungary could win the war and would dictate the terms of peace. But still there were some important officers who resigned, very probably because of the Declaration of Independence. Among these was one of the talented corps commanders, General András Gáspár.

In the beginning, Artur Görgei's stance towards the Declaration of Independence was uncertain. When, after the Battle of Isaszeg, Kossuth hinted at this plan to him, Görgei expressed only mild disapproval, but did not take a clear stand against it, nor did the other officers. This encouraged Kossuth to take this step. Even after the Declaration of Independence, Görgei did not express himself clearly against it, although in his later writings, he claims to have protested against it. But as early as May, Görgei secretly met members of the Peace Party, which was seeking to overturn the Declaration of Independence, and before them, he showed himself ready to use his troops to restore the situation that existed before the Declaration was proclaimed. However, when, in the summer of 1849, the Russian army invaded Hungary, he openly expressed his opinion that the Russian intervention was caused by Kossuth's proclamation of the Declaration of Independence, and this, starting with June, contributed to the deterioration of their relationship.

=== Fights along the western border ===
After the battle of Komárom on 26 April, the imperial armies retreated to the western border of the country, around Pozsony.

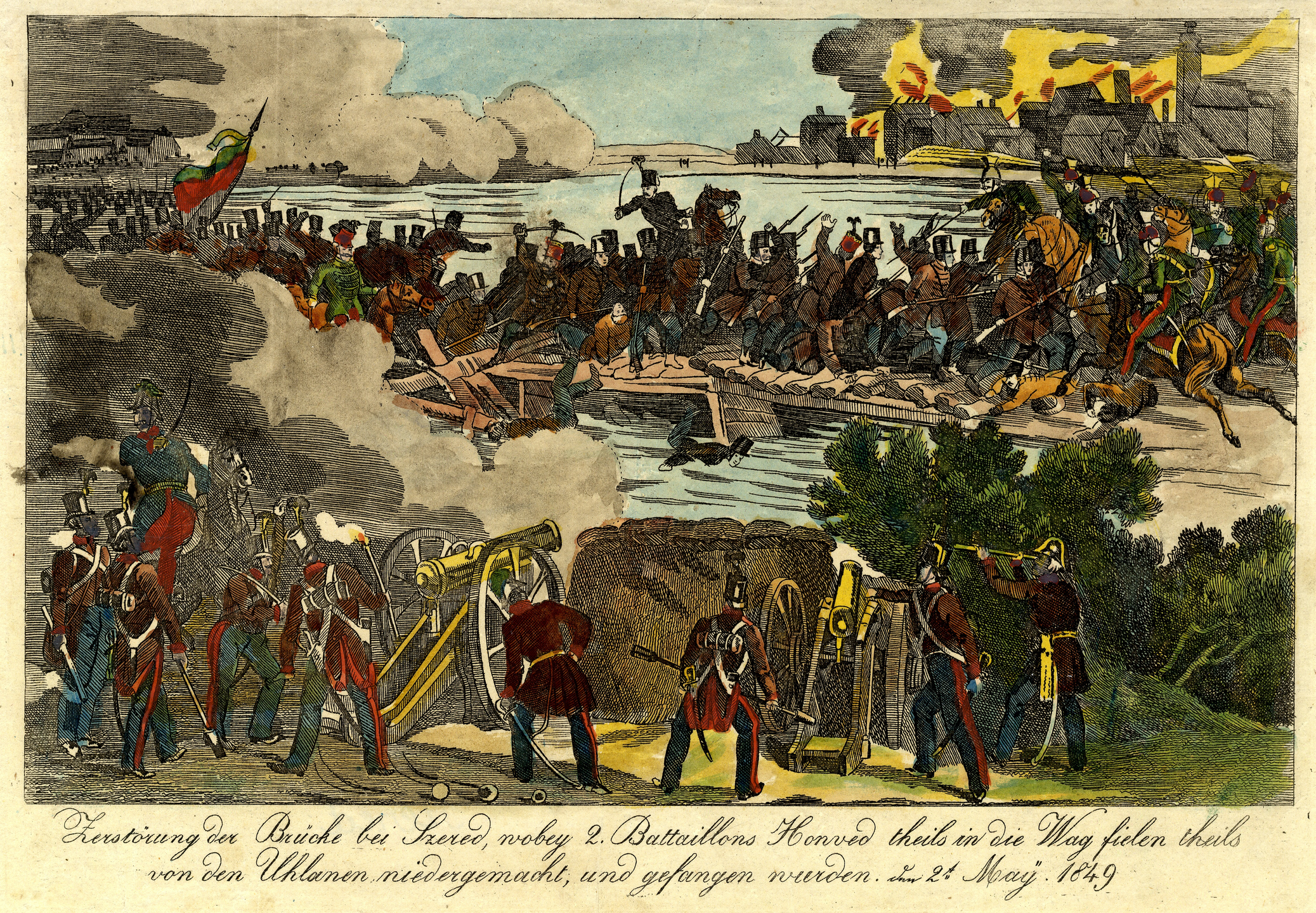
Battle of Szered, 2 May 1849

These troops were pursued by Colonel Ernő Poeltenberg with the VII Corps. During May, the Hungarian troops stationed at Győr and on the Rába line fought some small-scale battles with the K.u.K. troops stationed on the right bank of the Danube. Poeltenberg’s VII Corps of 7632 foot and 1411 mounted soldiers, despite being sporadically supported by the 9000 soldiers of the garrison of Komárom (called the VIII Corps), were hugely outnumbered by the Austrian armies gathered around Pozsony, which had 75 633 personnel, with 54 443 combat-ready soldiers and 237 cannons. Despite their significant numerical disadvantage, in the fights that occurred during the next month between the two sides, the VII Corps was able to hold its positions, and even initiate successful attacks. On 5 May, VII Corps chased the Imperial forces from Enese, as well as the imperial cavalry units that had come to their aid. On 9 May, however, Poeltenberg, on reconnaissance towards Moson, retreated from the overwhelming force of the enemy. On 11 May, Austrian troops led by General Franz Wyss consisting of 6 cavalry companies, 3 infantry battalions, 6 guns, and 2 Congreve rocket launchers (around 2500 men) were repulsed by Poeltenberg's 7 hussar companies, 1-2 infantry companies and 9-11 cannons (in total around 900-1000 men) in the Battle of Lesvár, as were the imperial troops attacking the Csallóköz. Austrian attacks continued in the following days, but the Hungarians repulsed them. On 19 May the imperial troops drove the Hungarian outposts out of Öttevény, but the next day the Hungarians recaptured the settlement. From 24 May until 7 June, however, there were no more clashes between the two sides.

=== Siege of the Buda Castle ===
After the capture of Komárom, the leaders of the Hungarian main army had to decide on the direction of further operations. Görgei and the Chief of the General Staff, Colonel József Bayer, advocated an advance towards the western Hungarian border, while General György Klapka, the man who had drawn up the plan for the Spring Campaign, argued for the capture of Buda. Klapka put forward two main arguments. The first was that without the forces left under Buda, the Hungarian main army was not strong enough to launch a successful attack.

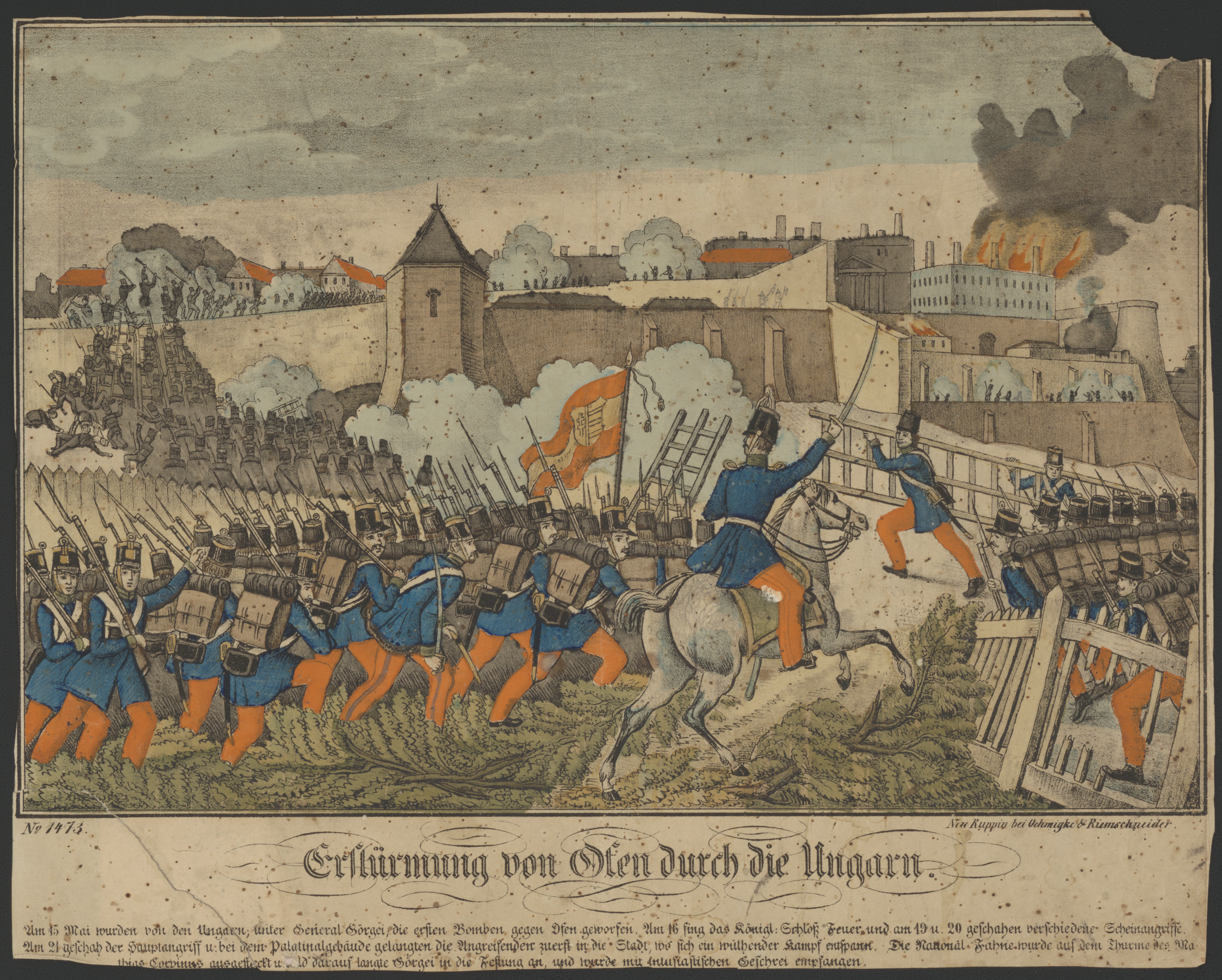
Siege of the Buda Castle - Neuruppiner Bilderbogen

The second was that as long as Buda was in Austrian hands, neither the Danube, the most important waterway, nor the only permanent bridge over the Danube in Hungary, the Chain Bridge, which was right in front of the Buda Castle, could be used by the Hungarian army. So, the control of the Austrian garrison over the Chain Bridge could cause serious disruptions to the transportation of supplies to the armies fighting in Western Hungary.

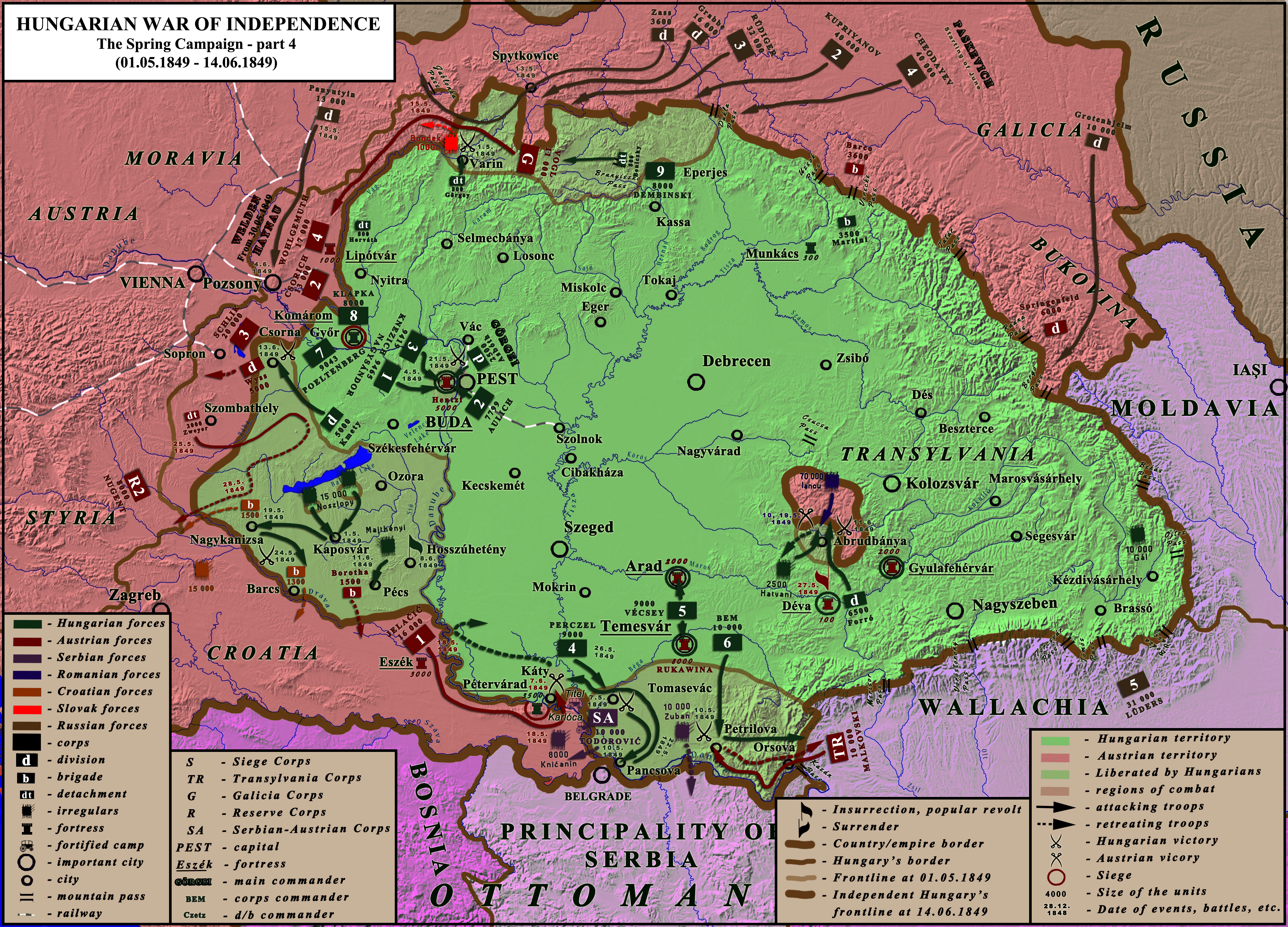
The Military Situation in Hungary between 01.05.1849-14.06.1849

Also, regarding the balance of power, the siege was the best choice, as the imperial army in front of Vienna had almost twice as many soldiers and cannons as the Hungarians had. So Görgei marched to Buda.

On 4 May, he called on General Heinrich Hentzi, who was the commander of the K.u.K. garrison, to surrender. Hentzi refused the offer, and in the following days, he unjustifiably bombarded Pest several times, even though Görgei's troops did not attack the castle from there. So the Siege of Buda begun. The decisive assault was launched in the early hours of 21 May, and by 6 a.m., the Hungarian flag was flying on the walls. Hentzi himself was mortally wounded in the battle. The capture of the castle was one of the shortest and most successful sieges of the Hungarian War of Independence: it lasted only 17 days, the Hungarians took almost 5,000 prisoners, and brought 248 cannons and thousands of rifles into the hands of the Hungarians.

== Capture of Northern Hungary ==
Colonel Lajos Beniczky's detachment of 450 soldiers, who, as seen above, successfully carried out the raid against Losonc on 24 March, in April continued its campaign in the northern Hungarian territories. After capturing Rimaszombat, Beniczky's detachment marched on 5 April to Szepesváralja, and on 7 April it captured Eperjes.

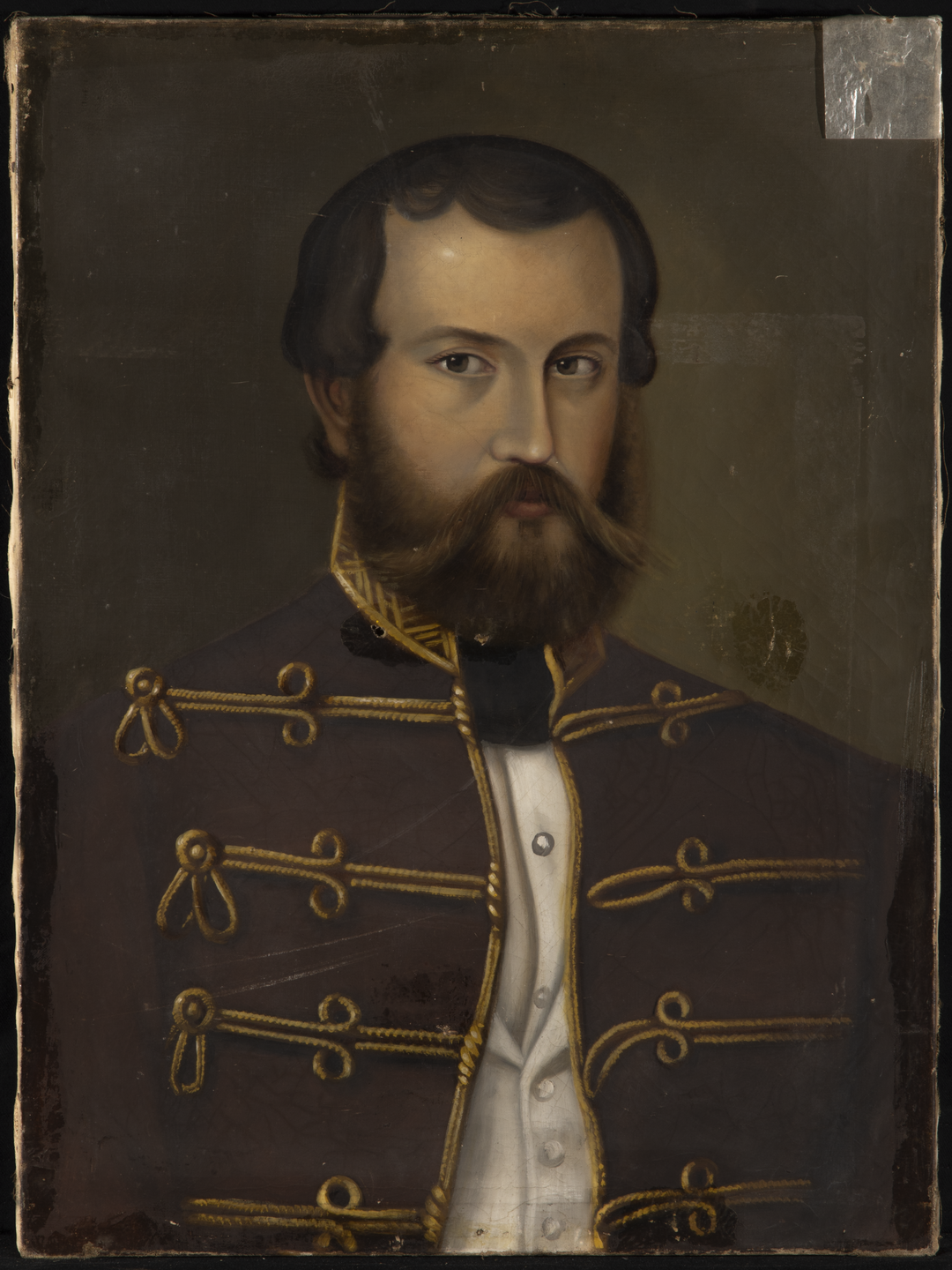
Lajos Beniczky

At the same time, Major Ármin Görgey, sent by his brother Artúr Görgei to secure the rear of the Hungarian main army, set off with a detachment of 6 companies of infantry, 1 company of Nicholas hussars, and 2 six-pounder guns to capture the mining towns of the Central part of Upper Hungary. On 18 April Ármin Görgey drove the Austrians out of Selmecbánya, and on 21 April he took Körmöcbánya. On 23 April, Görgey's vanguard attacked Major Heinrich van der Trenk's 2 infantry companies near Pribóc and chased them to Varin - which he captured a few days later. On 26 April, he routed Friedrich Bondek's Slovak militias at Zaskala, taking 160 prisoners, and successfully completing the capture of the economically important mining towns. As a result of these battles, Lajos Beniczky and Ármin Görgey, with their small detachments, captured the central part of Upper Hungary.

In the easternmost part of Northern Hungary, in the Ung, Bereg, and Máramaros counties, only small Hungarian troops were deployed to defend the Galician border. They were engaged in constant vanguard skirmishes with the imperial troops, which, from time to time, broke into Hungary from the other side of the border. In April, due to the unfavorable development of the military situation in Hungary, the Imperial Command decided to direct the forces that were indispensable in Galicia to the Hungarian theatre of operations under the command of Lieutenant General Gustav Vogel. One brigade, under the command of Major General Joseph Barco, advanced towards Munkács, the other two towards Eperjes and Lőcse. On 22 April in the Battle of Podhering, the Hungarian troops forced Barco to retreat. The other two brigades were supposed to advance towards Miskolc via Kassa, but due to the order of Field Marshal Windisch-Grätz on 10 April they moved towards the west, and in mid-May, they joined the main K.u.K. Army around Pozsony.

The retreaters were pursued by the detachments of Major Ármin Görgey and Major Lajos Beniczky.

To prevent similar break-ins, on 19 April Kossuth named Lieutenant General Henryk Dembiński as the commander of the Hungarian troops in Upper Hungary, which would be later organized as the IX Corps. In early May, various units of the Polish Legion, led by Major General Józef Wysocki, were also directed to this area. At the end of May, Dembiński resigned from the command of these troops, but only on 18 June did he hand over command to Wysocki.

== Capture of the Southern Transdanubia ==
Since the winter of 1848-49, Southern Transdanubia was under Austrian occupation. As the Hungarian military forces had been sent to capture other areas, Kossuth wanted to capture this region through a popular uprising.

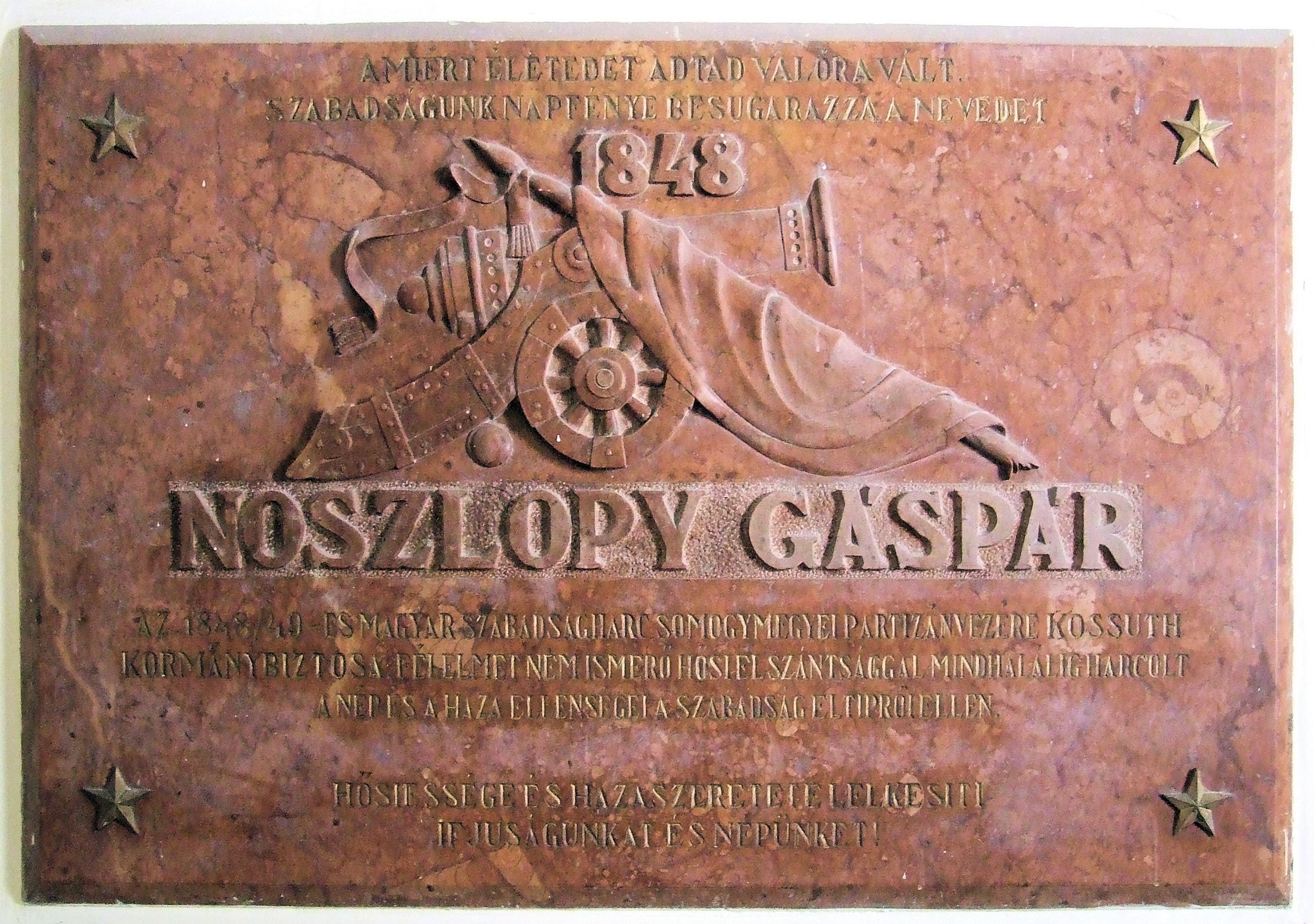
Commemorative plaque about the uprising led by Gáspár Noszlopy in Kaposvár

He therefore authorized Gáspár Noszlopy to organize a popular uprising to capture Somogy county. Noszlopy was a successful guerrilla leader, who, during Jelačić’s campaign in Hungary, on 26 September at Marcali, crushed a Croatian detachment, capturing 200 soldiers. On 19 April, Noszlopy set out from Baja with 35 volunteers, crossed the Danube in secret, arriving in disguise at Marcali after an adventurous journey, where he started a national insurrection, which, by the joining of the masses, quickly grew in a huge popular uprising. On 1 May, Noszlopy marched into Kaposvár, the capital of Somogy County, which had been previously abandoned by the frightened enemy troops. This victory captured most of Somogy county, and 15,000 people joined Noszlopy's movement. On 5 May the enemy garrison fled from Szigetvár to Pécs, and on the 24th, Noszlopy, with his troops, who had hardly any firearms, defeated the Austrian and Croatian troops numbering 1200 soldiers in the Battle of Barcs, and drove them into Slavonia. Then Noszlopy continued his campaign in Zala County, and on 20–21 May he expelled the enemy brigade occupying Nagykanizsa, which fled to Muraköz. Noszlopy then organized his insurgents into military units, constituting the 127th Honvéd Battalion, a Jäger squadron, and a cavalry company, and even had some cannons founded in Kaposvár. Southern Transdanubia was thus captured. The only area where the imperial troops remained in control was Baranya County. This was only due to the arrival there of Lieutenant General Josip Jelačić's imperial corps, sent to southern Hungary, and against which, of course, a popular uprising had no chance of success.

== Results and evaluation of the Spring Campaign ==
At the beginning of March, the Hungarian army held only the eastern part of the country, behind the Tisza- line, while in the south it retreated to the Maros line, holding also the northern half of Transylvania. But during the spring campaign, the Honvéds pushed the Austrian army back to the western border of the country, in the East captured Transylvania almost entirely, in the South they had freed the Banat, Bácska regions and almost all Southern Transdanubia, and except the regions west to the Vág River they captured Northern Hungary.

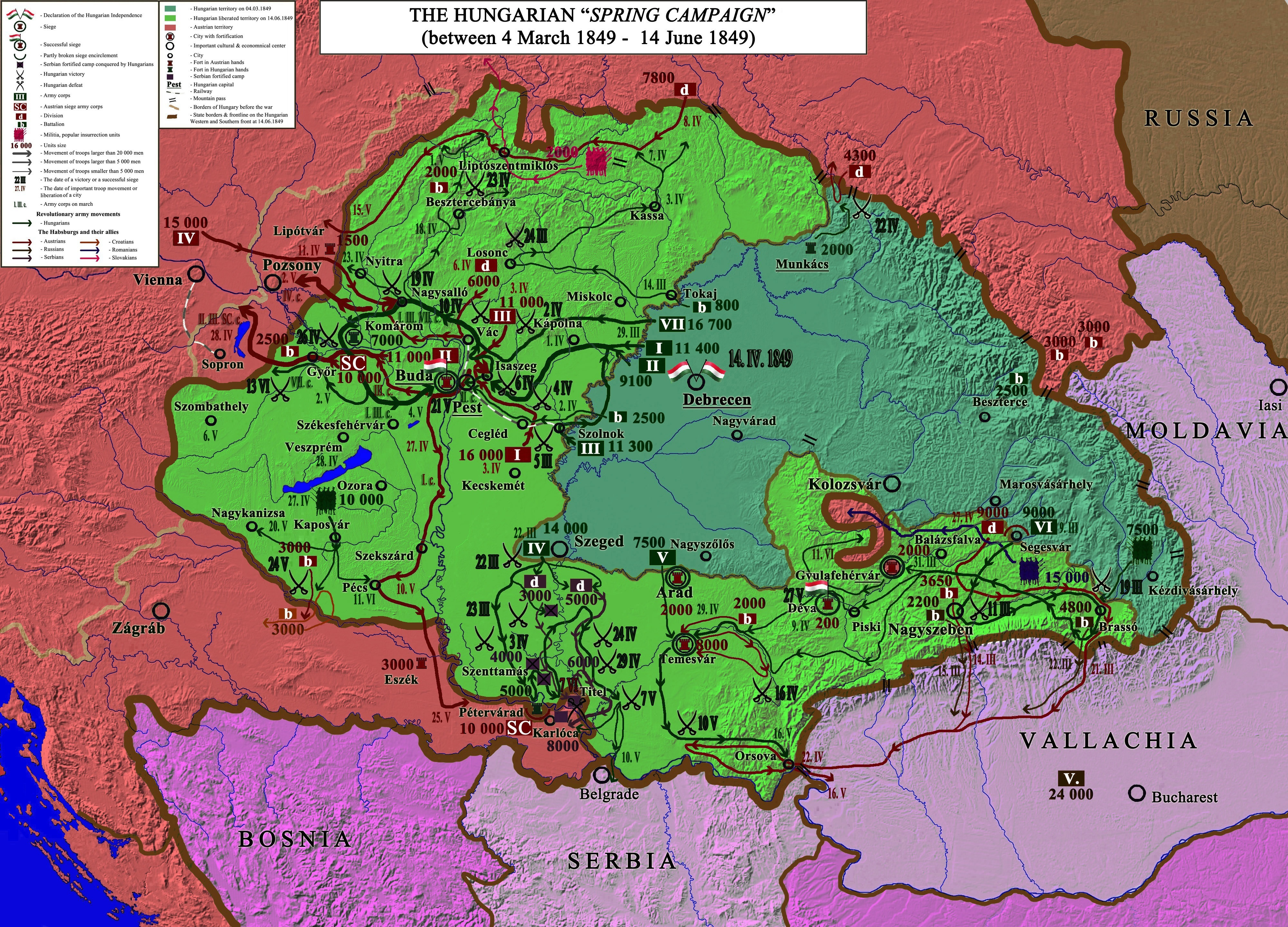
The Hungarian Spring Campaign in 1849, and capture of much of Hungary until 15 June 1849, before the Russian intervention and the Austrian counterattack started

The Hungarian forces, however, were only able to reclaim the territories lost during the autumn and winter campaigns. Strategic locations such as Lipótvár and Eszék remained under imperial control. Although the total area still held by the imperial and allied forces was relatively small in square kilometers, these enclaves posed significant challenges. Each regained region often contained at least one critical point that required constant surveillance or blockade, tying down valuable Hungarian troops. The only notable exception was the successful recapture of Buda, which fully restored control in that area.

During the Spring Campaign, the imperial army had multiple opportunities to inflict major defeats on individual Hungarian corps—early March in Transylvania, and again in early and mid-April on the main front. Yet, it consistently failed to capitalize on these chances. This failure was due not only to the rigidity of the imperial command but equally to the adaptability and agility of Hungarian leadership.

Bem’s offensive against Nagyszeben, Perczel’s operations in the Bácska region, and Görgei’s strategic maneuvers during the spring all demonstrated this Hungarian flexibility. While perfect coordination among the different Hungarian corps was not always achieved, the Hungarian army still outperformed its imperial counterpart in this regard. Remarkably, the Hungarian national army, formed only nine months earlier, defeated the armies of one of Europe's largest empires in an offensive campaign, despite their numerical superiority on all fronts.

Historians differ in opinion regarding whether, in May, the Hungarian forces should have besieged the fortress of Buda or continued the offensive campaign toward Vienna. According to Tamás Csikány, the siege of Buda was a mistake, as the Austrian troops retreating toward Pozsony and the Vienna area should have been attacked and defeated instead. In contrast, Róbert Hermann argues that such a campaign would have stood no real chance of success, as the Austrians had concentrated 76,633 troops around Vienna, of which 54,443 were combat-ready. Meanwhile, due to the need to monitor the Austrian garrison in Buda and detach forces to Upper Hungary, Görgei could count on significantly fewer troops, making the success of such an offensive highly uncertain.

== Sources ==
- Andrássy, Antal (1987), "Noszlopy Gáspár (1820 - 1853)", Somogyi Almanach 43-44. (in Hungarian)
- Babucs, Zoltán (2020), "" A tavaszi hadjárat nyitánya: győztes ütközet Hort–Hatvan térségében 1849. április 2-án" (Start of the Spring Campaign: Victorious Battle in the Hort–Hatvan Area on April 2, 1849)", Magyarságkutató Intézet (1 April 2020) (in Hungarian)
- Babucs, Zoltán (2022), "Batrán! elereé magyár! szurony szegeé! A nagysallói ütközet, 1849. április 19 (Brave! Forvard Hungarian! Bayonet Charge! The Battle of Nagysalló, April 19, 1849)", Magyarságkutató Intézet (18 April 2022) (in Hungarian)
- Babucs, Zoltán (2023), "Beniczky és "száguldó különítménye" (Beniczky and his "flying squad")", Ma7 2023. április 16 (in Hungarian)
- Babucs, Zoltán (2023), "Görgey Ármin őrnagy "száguldó csapatja" a bányavárosokban (Ármin Görgey's "Flying Squad" in the Mining Towns)", Felvidék.ma 2023. április 18 (in Hungarian)
- Babucs, Zoltán (2021), "Ma kell győzni vagy mehetünk vissza a Tisza mögé! (We Must Win Today, or we Can Go Back Behind the Tisza!)", Magyarságkutató Intézet (6 April 2021) (in Hungarian)
- Babucs, Zoltán (2021), ""Százhatvannégy esztendővel ezelőtt volt a losonci rajtaütés" (One Hundred and Sixty-four Years Ago, was the Raid on Losonc)", Magyarságkutató Intézet (24 March 2020) (in Hungarian)
- Babucs, Zoltán (2022), "Utánam fiúk, hiszen mienk ez a haza! - A váci ütközet (1849. április 10.) (After Me Boys, Because this Country is Ours! Battle of Vác. 10 April 1849)", Magyarságkutató Intézet (9 April 2022) (in Hungarian)
- Bánlaky, József (2001). A magyar nemzet hadtörténelme ("The Military History of the Hungarian Nation). Arcanum Adatbázis Kft.
- Bényei, Miklós (1998), "A függetlenség napja: 1849. április 14. (Day of Independence 14 April 1849)", Hajdú-Bihar Megyei Levéltár Évkönyve XXV 143 (in Hungarian)
- Bona, Gábor (2018). Az 1848/49-es szabadságharc tisztikara ("The Officers of the War of Independence of 1848/49). Arcanum Adatbázis Kft.
- Bona, Gábor; Csikány, Tamás; Dobszay, Tamás (1996). 1848-1849 A szabadságharc és forradalom története ("1848-1849 The History of the War of Independence and the Revolution") (in Hungarian). Budapest: Videópont. ISBN 963-8218-207.
- Bona, Gábor (1999). The Hungarian Revolution and War of Independence, 1848-1849. A Military History. New York: Columbia University Press. p. 606. ISBN 0-88033-433-9.
- Csikány, Tamás (2015). A szabadságharc hadművészete 1848-1849 ("The Military Art of the War of Independence 1848-1849") (in Hungarian). Budapest: Zrínyi. ISBN 978--963-327-647-1.
- Csikány, Tamás (2007), "Hadászati vezetés a gödöllői hadjáratban (Military Command in the Gödöllő Campaign)" (PDF), Aetas 22. évf. (2007.) 4. sz.
- Csikány, Tamás (2008). Hadművészet az 1848-49-es magyar szabadságharcban("The Military Art of the Freedom War of 1848-1849") (in Hungarian). Budapest: Zrínyi Miklós Nemzetvédelmi Egyetem Hadtudományi Kar. p. 200.
- Csikány, Tamás; Hermann, Róbert (1998), "Buda ostroma. Egy historiográfiai vita tényei (Siege of Buda. Facts of a historiographical debate)", Életünk, 1998 (36. évfolyam, 1-12. szám)
- Egyed, Ákos (2010). Erdély 1848–1849 ("Transylvania in 1848-1849") (in Hungarian). Csíkszereda: Pallas-Akadémia Könyvkiadó. p. 616. ISBN 978-973-665-312-4.
- Frankl, István (1900), "A kaponyai ütközet (Battle of Kaponya)" (PDF), A Bács-Bodrog Megyei Történelmi Társulat Évkönyve 16.
- Gelich, Richárd (1889). Magyarország függetlenségi harcza III (The Independence War of Hungary vol. III) (in Hungarian). Budapest: Aigner Lajos.
- Gyalókay, Jenő (1931). Az első orosz megszállás és Erdély felszabadítása ("The First Russian Occupation and the Liberation of Transylvania) (in Hungarian). Budapest: Magyar Tudományos Akadémia.
- Hermann, Róbert (2001). 1848-1849. A szabadságharc hadtörténete ("1848–1849. The History of the War of Independence) (in Hungarian). Budapest: Korona Kiadó. p. 424. ISBN 9639376213.
- Hermann, Róbert (2004). Az 1848–1849-es szabadságharc nagy csatái ("Great battles of the Hungarian War of Independence of 1848–1849") (in Hungarian). Budapest: Zrínyi. ISBN 963-327-367-6.
- Hermann, Róbert (1999). Az abrudbányai tragédia ("The Tragedy of Abrudbánya) (in Hungarian). Budapest: Heraldika Kiadó. p. 330. ISBN 963-858-5315.
- Hermann, Róbert (2000). "Buda bevétele, 1849. május 21 (The Capture of Buda on 21 May 1849)". Budapesti Negyed 29–30. Archived from the original on January 23, 2005.
- Hermann, Róbert (1998), "Gyulafehérvár ostroma (Siege of Gyulafehérvár)", Életünk 1998 (36. évfolyam, 1-12. szám)
- Hermann, Róbert (2017), "Interetnikus konfliktusok Magyarországon 1848-1849-ben (Interetnic Conflicts in Hungary in 1848-1849)" (PDF), Délvidéki Szemle 2017/02 (in Hungarian)
- Hermann, Róbert (1998), "Kossuth és Görgei (Kossuth and Görgei)" (PDF), Iskolakultúra 1998. 3.szám (in Hungarian)
- Hermann, Róbert (2009). Magyarország története 14. Forradalom és szabadságharc 1848-1849 ("The history of Hungary 14. The Hungarian Revolution and War of Independence of 1848–1849) (in Hungarian). Budapest: Kossuth Kiadó. p. 112. ISBN 978-963-09-5692-5.
- Hermann, Róbert (2011). A magyar függetlenségi háború [Great Battles 16: The Hungarian Freedom War]. Nagy csaták. 16. (in Hungarian). Budapes t: Duna Könyvklub. ISBN 978-615-5129-00-1.
- Horváth, Gábor (2013), "A lesvári ütközet, 1849. május 11-én (Battle of Lesvár, 11 May 1849)", Hagibal Glogspot 2013. február 16 (in Hungarian)
- Horváth, Gábor (2017). "A tápióbicskei csata – Ezen a napon történt (The Battle of Tápióbicske. This Day Happened)". Győri Szalon. Archived from the original on April 25, 2025.
- Lázár, Balázs (2002), "A Pest alatti harcok 1849. április 10. és 21. között (Battles Under Pest between April 10 and 21, 1849)" (PDF), Hadtörténelmi Közlemények 115. évfolyam
- Lázár, István (1999). An Illustrated History of Hungary (in Hungarian). Budapest: Corvina. ISBN 9789631348873.
- Leczo, Bence (2023), "Ausztria megvívott egy teljesen felesleges háborút – Hermann Róbert történész a szabadságharcról", Kultura.hu 2023. október 6 (in Hungarian)
- Lehoczky, Tivadar (1899). A munkácsi vár 1848-1849-ben (The Munkács Castle in 1848-1849) (PDF) (in Hungarian). Munkács: Kroó Hugó Kiadása.
- Nobili, Johann (1851). Der Winter-Feldzug 1848-1849 in Ungarn (The Winter Campaign in Hungary in 1848-1849) (in German). München: Leopold Sommer.
- Olchváry, Ödön (1902). A magyar függetlenségi harc 1848-1849-ben a Délvidéken (in Hungarian). Budapest: Márkus Samu Könyvnyomdája.
- Romsics, Ignác; Király K., Béla (1996). Geopolitics in the Danube Region. Hungarian Reconciliation Efforts, 1848-1998 (in Hungarian). Budapest: CEUPress. ISBN 978-963-9116-29-0.
- Rubint, Dezső (1925), "A váci ütközet 1849 ápr. 10-én" (PDF), Hadtörténelmi Közlemények (in Hungarian)
- Spira, György (1959). A magyar forradalom 1848–49-ben [The Hungarian Revolution in 1848–1849] (in Hungarian). Budapest: Gondolat Kiadó. p. 676.
- Solymosi, József (2001), "A podheringi ütközet 1849. április 22. (Battle of Podhering. 22 April 1849)", AD ACTA A Hadtörténelmi Levéltár évkönyve (in Hungarian)
- Süli, Attila (2017). "A dévai vár 1848–49-ben (The Déva Castle in 1848-1849)". Művelődés LXXI évfolyam - 2018. Archived from the original on May 14, 2025.
- Tarján M., Tamás, "A komáromi csata (Battle of Komárom)", Rubicon (in Hungarian)
- Tarján M., Tamás, "V. Ferdinánd lemond trónjairól Ferenc József javára (Ferdinand the 5th Renounces to his Trone to Franz Joseph)", Rubicon (in Hungarian)
- Thim, József (1940). A magyarországi 1849-49-iki szerb fölkelés története I (History of the Serb Uprising in Hungary in 1848-49 vol. I) (PDF) (in Hungarian). Budapest: Magyar Történelmi Társulat.
