= Battle of Isaszeg =

There have been two Battles of Isaszeg in history of Hungary:

- Battle of Isaszeg (1265)
- Battle of Isaszeg (1849)
