= Szerafin Thinagl =

Hungarian pharmacist (1880–1956)

- Born: 21 October 1880; Nagyszombat, Kingdom of Hungary
- Died: 2 November 1956 (aged 76); Budapest, Hungary
- Occupation: Pharmacist
- Known for: First woman to obtain a university degree in pharmacy in Hungary
- Spouse: Mihály Pesthy
- Children: István Pesthy, Zsuzsanna Pesthy

Szerafin Thinagl (21 October 1880 – 2 November 1956) was a Hungarian pharmacist who became the first woman to obtain a university degree in pharmacy in Hungary. She graduated from the Royal Hungarian Franz Joseph University in Kolozsvár (now Cluj-Napoca, Romania) in 1903 and subsequently managed and owned pharmacies in both Transylvania and Hungary.

== Early life and education ==
Thinagl was born in Nagyszombat (now Trnava, Slovakia), then part of the Kingdom of Hungary. She completed her pharmaceutical apprenticeship at the Arany Egyszarvú (Golden Unicorn) Pharmacy in her hometown. According to later accounts, she financed her university studies from the income she earned during her apprenticeship.

In 1901, she enrolled in pharmaceutical studies at the Royal Hungarian Franz Joseph University in Kolozsvár. At the time, women were only beginning to gain access to higher education in Hungary. Contemporary accounts describe various restrictions placed upon female students, including limitations on their participation in university life and separate seating arrangements during lectures.

On 18 June 1903, Thinagl graduated with distinction, becoming the first woman to receive a university diploma in pharmacy in Hungary.

== Professional career ==
In 1904 she married pharmacist Mihály Pesthy. The couple acquired the Őrangyal (Guardian Angel) Pharmacy in Déva (now Deva, Romania), where they lived and worked during the first years of their marriage. Their son István was born in 1906 and their daughter Zsuzsanna in 1909.

After the sale of the Déva pharmacy, Thinagl managed the Isteni Gondviselés (Divine Providence) Pharmacy in Sárközújlak (now Livada Mică, Romania) between 1910 and 1915. These years formed an important part of her professional activity in Transylvania.

In 1918, the family moved to Isaszeg in Pest County and purchased the Angyal (Angel) Pharmacy. Following the death of her husband in 1930, Thinagl became the owner and manager of the pharmacy. She continued to operate the business through the interwar period and the Second World War.

In 1947, management of the pharmacy was transferred to her daughter Zsuzsanna. The following year, the pharmacy was nationalised as part of the wider state takeover of private businesses in Hungary.

== Later life and death ==
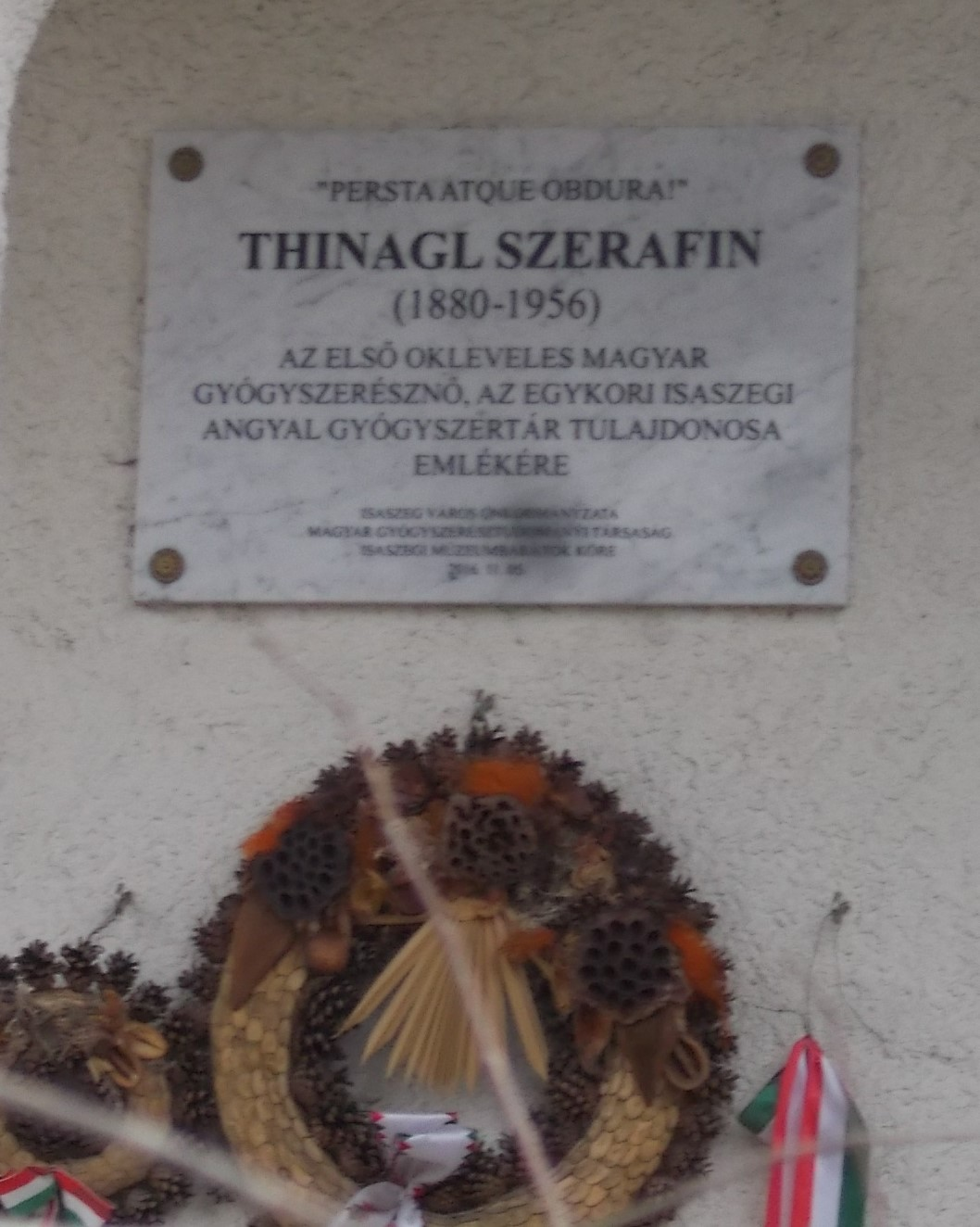
Thinagl's commemorative plaque in Isaszeg

After the nationalisation of the pharmacy, Thinagl moved to Budapest, where she lived with her son, István Pesthy, a dentist. She died on 2 November 1956 during the Hungarian Revolution of 1956.

According to local historical accounts, the circumstances of the revolution complicated burial arrangements in Budapest. Her remains were later reinterred at Farkasréti Cemetery.

== Legacy ==
Thinagl is remembered as a pioneer of women's participation in higher education and the pharmaceutical profession in Hungary. On 21 September 2017, the Isaszeg Local Heritage Committee included her in the Isaszeg Heritage Registry under the category of health and lifestyle heritage.

A commemorative plaque dedicated to Thinagl is located in Budapest, and another memorial plaque in Isaszeg commemorates her achievements as the first female pharmacist to graduate from a Hungarian university.
