= Isaszeg =

Town in Pest county, Hungary

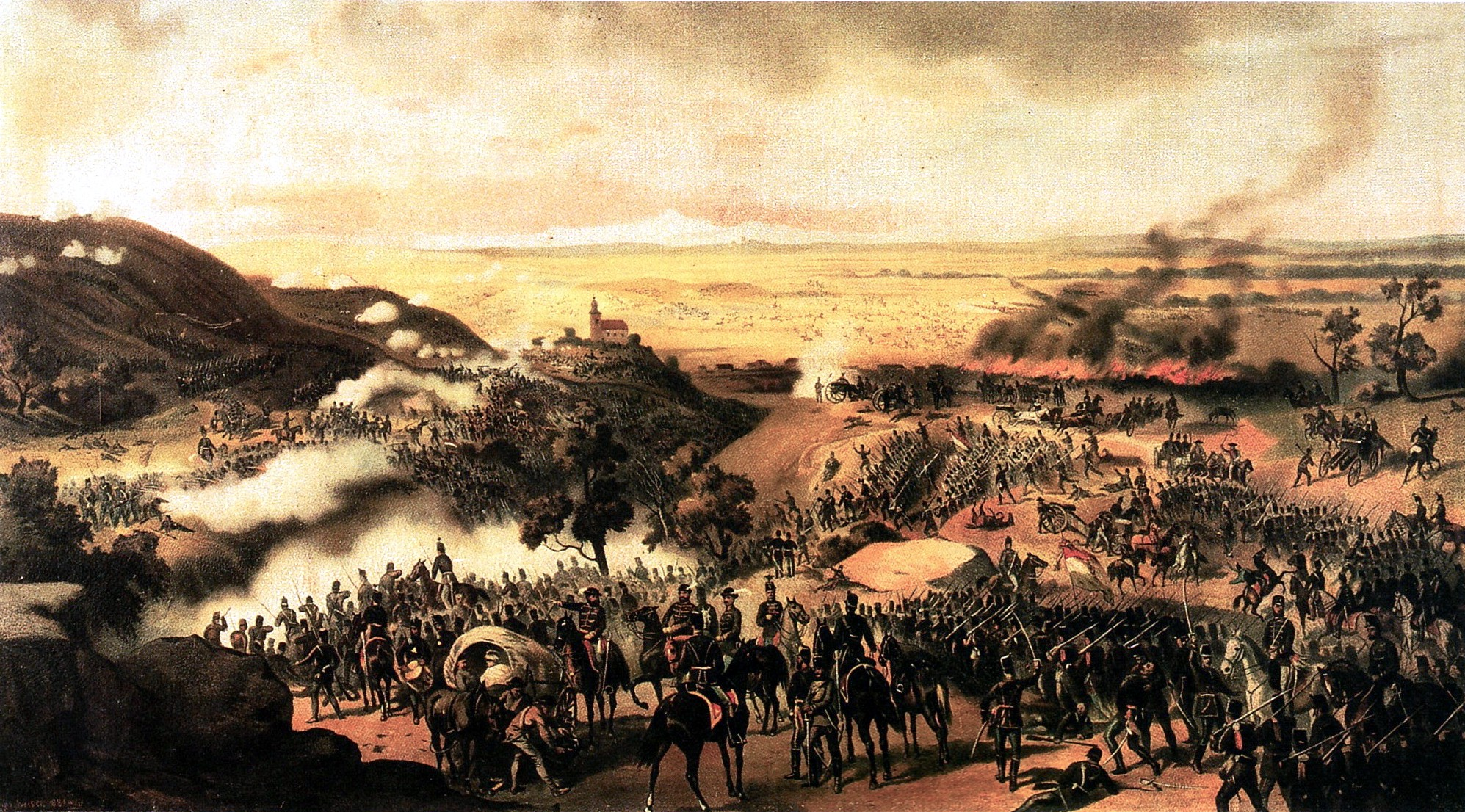
- Battle of Isaszeg

- Flag Coat of arms

- Location of Isaszeg in Hungary
- Coordinates: 47.53005°N 19.39913°E
- Country: Hungary
- Region: Central Hungary
- County: Pest
- Subregion: Gödöllői
- Rank: City

Area
  - Total: 54.83 km^{2} (21.17 sq mi)

Population (2017)
  - Total: 11,402
  - Density: 208.0/km^{2} (538.6/sq mi)
- Time zone: UTC+1 (CET)
  - Summer (DST): UTC+2 (CEST)
- Postal code: 2117
- Area code: +36 28
- KSH code: 07807
- Website: www.isaszeg.hu

Isaszeg is a town in Pest county, Budapest metropolitan area, Hungary. It has a population of 10,979 (2007).

== Sightseeing ==
On the top of the cemetery hill stands the old parochial church of the village. It was last rebuilt in gothic style. However, the foundations of the old rotunda is visible north and south of the nave of the church. The recent church was built by the eastern extension (apsis) and by western extension (nave and choir) of the original rotunda. The church has western tower with rectangular lower part and octagonal upper part, as in many Hungarian old churches (for example: Nagymaros, Csurgó, Aracs, Somogyvámos, Szeged - Dömötör tower, Felsőörs)

== Twin towns – sister cities ==
Isaszeg is twinned with:

- Bojanów, Poland
- Cozmeni, Romania
- Kechnec, Slovakia
- Sânmartin, Romania
- Suza (Kneževi Vinogradi), Croatia
- Trstená, Slovakia

Isaszeg also cooperates with Mali Iđoš, Serbia.

== Notable people ==
- György Lázár (1924–2014), Communist politician
