= Felsőörs =

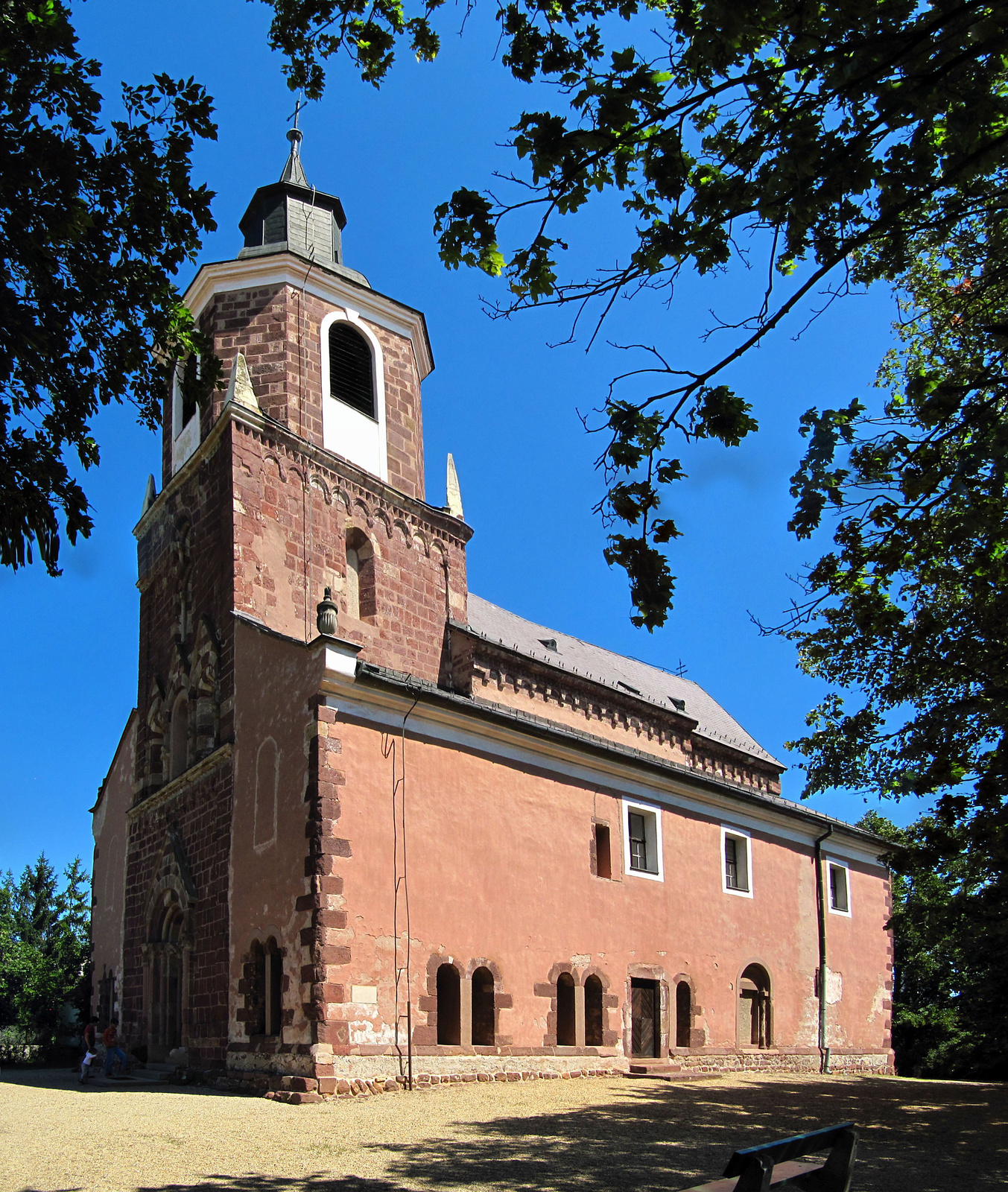

- Flag Coat of arms

- Location of Felsőörs in Hungary
- Coordinates: 47.0144°N 17.9522°E
- Country: Hungary
- Region: Central Transdanubia
- County: Veszprém

Area
  - Total: 17.23 km^{2} (6.65 sq mi)

Population (2018)
  - Total: 1,720
  - Density: 99.8/km^{2} (259/sq mi)
- Time zone: UTC+1 (CET)
  - Summer (DST): UTC+2 (CEST)
- Postal code: 8227
- Area code: +36 87
- Website: http://felsoors.hu/

Felsőörs is a village in Veszprém county, Hungary. It is not far from Veszprém, the ancient royal center for the Hungarian queens.

== Sightseeing ==
The chief monument of the village is the Romanesque church dating from the age of the Árpádian kings. It was founded in the 11th century by a local landowner family for the provostry of priests. The richly carved stones refer, however, to royal donator of the ancient Romanesque church.

The western tower was erected first. The carved stones of the wall reveal that the tower was planned to stand alone and was bordered by walls on three sides. Later the façade surrounded the walls of the tower and the main western façade shows the rich sculptural and architectural details.

The shape of the three-quarter circle of the eastern apse reveals that a rotunda was once standing on the other side of the recent church. A great number of Hungarian churches are characterized by this structure when the rotunda serves as the main apse of the later romanesque church. This hypothesis is confirmed by the fact that the church was surrounded by a cemetery in ancient times.
