= Juraj Bartusz =

Slovak sculptor (1933–2025)

- Bartusz c. 2014
- Born: 23 October 1933; Kamenín, Czechoslovakia
- Died: 25 September 2025 (aged 91); Košice, Slovakia
- Education: Academy of Fine Arts in Prague
- Occupations: Sculptor; Academic teacher
- Organizations: Academy of Fine Arts and Design in Bratislava; Academy of Fine Arts in Prague; Technical University of Košice
- Movement: Abstract art; Concrete art; Computer art
- Spouse(s): Mária Bartuszová (m. 1961; div. 1984) Jana Bodnárová
- Awards: Order of Ľudovít Štúr

Juraj Bartusz (23 October 1933 – 25 September 2025) was a Slovak sculptor and academic teacher. In a non-conventional approach from the mid-1960s, he created time-space statues and began computer art in the 1970s. He co-founded and headed the department of visual arts at the Technical University of Košice.

== Life and career ==
Bartusz was born on 23 October 1933 in the village of Kamenín in the Nové Zámky District. His father was a mason. At the age of twelve, Bartusz narrowly survived the detonation of a land mine during the Second World War. Though gravely injured, he considered himself fortunate as many children from his village were killed in the fighting.

Bartusz studied sculpture at the Academy of Arts, Architecture and Design in Prague from 1954 to 1958 with Josef Wagner and later with Jan Kavan. He studied further at the Academy of Fine Arts in Prague, first with Karel Pokorný and then with Karel Hladík.

In Prague he met the sculptor Mária Bartuszová; they married and settled in Košice after his graduation in 1963, where he remained for life. After arrival to Košice, he briefly worked in the PR department of the East Slovak Ironworks but soon quit as he disliked promotion work and decided to make a living as an independent artist instead. From 1967 he was a member of the Club of Concretists for concrete art, led by art historian Arsen Pohribny. After 1968, Bartusz participated in underground art circles, including clandestine exhibitions and meetings that were subject to surveillance and interrogations by the State Security. In 1973, he was questioned for exhibiting works in Hungary without official approval, as they had not passed the ideological commission. His artistic practice, characterized by action-oriented approaches and experimentation with diverse materials and forms, was guided by the principle: “The principles that are established must be broken. That applies in art as well. If you don’t break them, you remain standing in one place.”

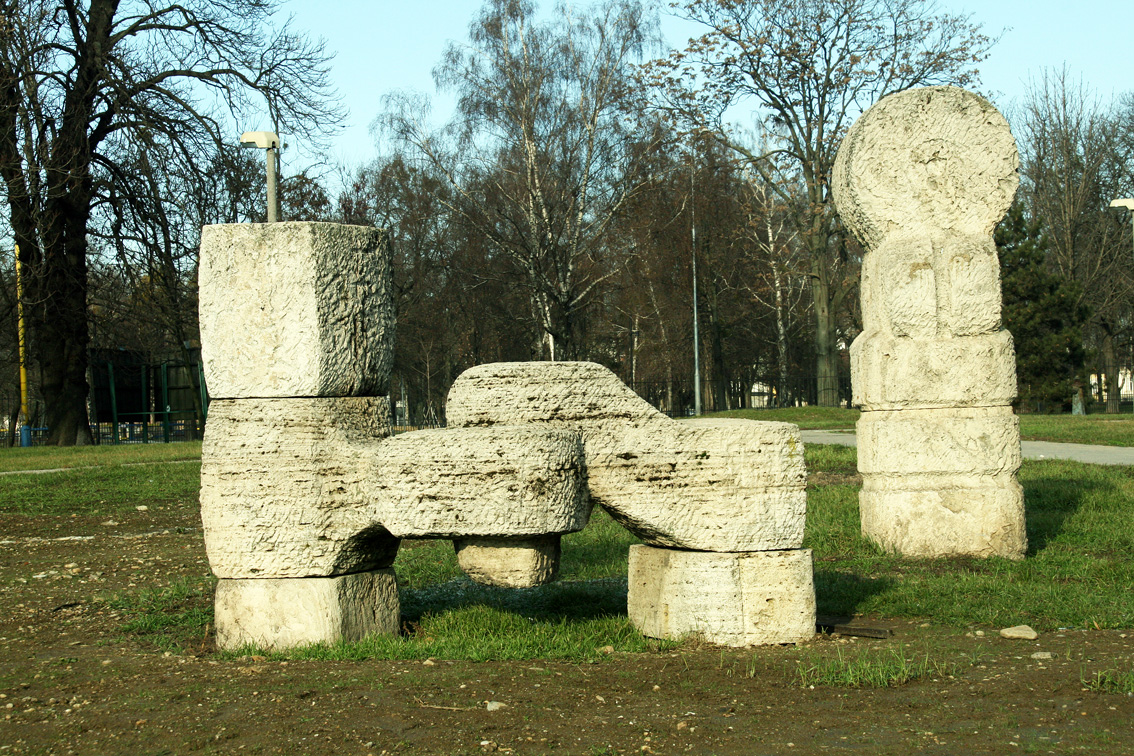
Sculpture in Košice

He started computer art in 1972, in collaboration with programmer Vladimír Haltenberger. They used computer-generated curves as a template for rotational human-like sculptures. The initial designs were chosen from random computer-created series. "The broad spectrum of author’s work includes constructivist sculpture, action and conceptual art, site-specific art, as well as installation. In the nineteen eighties he started working with the time factor and began to create time-limited paintings and drawings, and model his works by forceful hits, e.g. throwing bricks to solidifying plaster or slamming the material with planks or rubber straps, referring to the energy of the author’s gesture."

=== Academic career ===
Bartusz was a professor at the Academy of Fine Arts and Design in Bratislava from 1990 to 1999. In 1992 he was appointed professor at the Academy of Fine Arts in Prague where he had studied. In 1999, Bartusz co-founded the department of visual arts at the Technical University of Košice, He founded a department of visual arts and intermedia at the university, heading the 3D Studio of free Creativity.

=== Personal life ===
Bartusz was married to the sculptor Mária Bartuszová from 1961 to 1984. He later married the poet Jana Bodnárová.

Bartusz died in Košice on 25 September 2025, at the age of 91.

== Recognition ==
Bartusz was awarded the Order of Ľudovít Štúr, 2nd class, by president of Slovakia Zuzana Čaputová in 2024.

== Public collections ==
Bartusz's art is part of public collections, including:

- Slovak National Gallery in Bratislava
- East Slovak Gallery, Košice
- Albertina, Vienna, Austria
- Museum of Fine Arts, Budapest, Hungary
- House of Arts, Olomouc, Czech Republic
- Villa Merkel, Esslingen am Neckar, Germany
- Nitra Gallery, Nitra, Slovak Republic
- L. Kassák Museum, Nové Zámky, Slovak Republic
- The Art Gallery of Považie, Žilina, Slovak Republic
