= Mária Bartuszová =

Slovak sculptor (1936–1996)

- Born: 24 April 1936; Prague, Czechoslovakia
- Died: 22 December 1996 (aged 60); Košice, Slovakia
- Known for: Sculpture, ceramics
- Movement: Abstract art, Concrete art
- Spouse: Juraj Bartusz

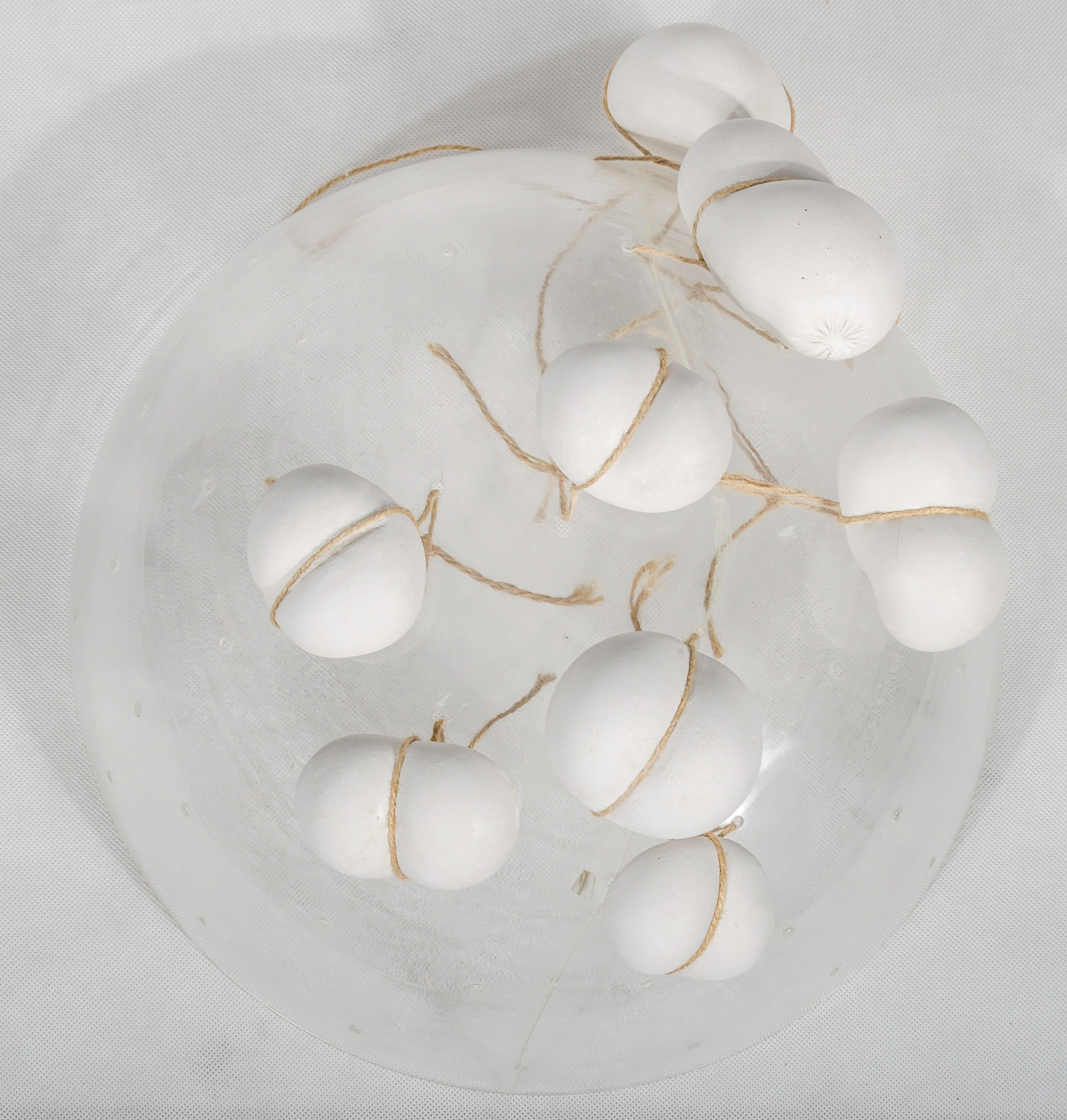
Bez tytułu, 1987

Mária Bartuszová (24 April 1936 – 22 December 1996) was a Slovak sculptor known for her abstract white plaster sculptures. Her work is included in the Centre Pompidou in Paris, the Slovak National Gallery in Bratislava and the Tate in London. Her artwork is part of curated selection of Venice Biennale titled "Milk of Dreams", Arsenale Area (April - November 2022)

== Biography ==
Mária Bartuszová was born on 24 April 1936 in Prague, Czechoslovakia.

From 1951 through 1955 she studied at the Higher School of Applied Arts in Prague. She went on to study at the Academy of Arts, Architecture and Design in Prague from 1956 through 1961. After her graduation she moved from Prague to Košice, Slovakia with her husband, sculptor Juraj Bartusz.

In 1966 Bartuszová was included in the Exhibition of the Young at the House of Arts in Brno, Czech Republic, her first recorded exhibit. She was a member of the Concretists' Club (Klub konkrétistů), a Concrete art organization. She exhibited her art throughout her lifetime, mostly in Czechoslovakia, Slovakia and the Czech Republic.

Bartuszová died on 22 December 1996 in Košice. Her artwork is included in the Centre Pompidou in Paris and the Slovak National Gallery in Bratislava. Her work is also in the collection of the Tate in London and was scheduled to be shown in a solo retrospective there in 2020. Due to COVID pandemic restriction was postponed to September 2022 - April 2023. Opening week of her monograph exhibition entitled "Maria Bartuszová" at TATE Modern Gallery in London 20th Sept. 2022, was accompanied with large press attention. "Her unique biomorphic casts touch on big themes such as belonging, growth and infinity. Bartuszová worked outside the traditional centres of contemporary art, yet her pieces are far from marginal. A retrospective at Tate Modern will offer a comprehensive take on her vision and resourcefulness,"Guardian wrote.

== Characteristics of her artworks ==
While Bartuszová remains a relatively unknown Slovak sculptor, her artwork was presented to the general public during documenta in Kassel in 2007 (curated by Roger M. Buergel, Ruth Noack). Following this, her works appeared occasionally in international exhibitions with some becoming part of prestigious collections of contemporary art. Her artworks have been exhibited individually, without a broader context and with no reference to the broader dynamics within her practice.

Bartuszová's important exhibitions are: Path to the Organic Sculpture, and Mária Bartuszová: Provisional Forms. A majority of her sculptures are made of plaster, a material that is preparatory and impermanent by nature. For this reason her sculptures are, by design, tentative, unfinished and transitory. On occasion, when "Bartuszová succumbed to the temptations of using aluminium or bronze, she would immediately undermine their material weight, through either form or subject matter: softening the material, putting it in motion, altering its proportions, and mocking gravity."

Her artworks in the second half of the 1960s were influenced by her individual vision of constructive geometric tendencies connected with new materials such as cut aluminium. In 1976 and 1983, together with art historian G. Kladek, she ran workshops for disabled and visually impaired children. She created sculptures that enabled those unable to see to get to know various forms and textures, to differentiate between geometric and organic forms, to recognise their emotional significance, and to develop an alternative usage of art, with an emphasis on the haptic characteristics of sculpture.

From the 1980s, her work was dominated by pure, ovoid forms, such as hollowed eggs and shells, and idealized shapes that had been subjected to deformation – crushing, squeezing, breaking, and tying, such as oval forms of fragile plaster matter, constrained with string, and sometimes weighted with small stones. In her works produced after the mid-1980s, Bartuszová began to employ a singular method of obtaining plaster casts by means of a signature technique, called "pneumatic shaping".

== Public collections ==
- Slovak National Gallery in Bratislava, Slovak Republic
- East Slovak Gallery, Košice, Slovak Republic
- Tate Gallery, London
- Muzeum Sztuki Nowoczesnej w Warszawie / Museum of Modern Art Warszava, Poland
- Centre Pompidou / Museé d´ Art Moderne, Paris, France
- Kontakt. The Art Collection of Erste Group and Erste Foundation, Vienna, Austria
- The First Slovak Investment Group's Collection (PSIS), Slovakia
- Pinault Collection, Venice, Italy
- Goetz Collection, Munich, Germany
- Museum Susch, Switzerland
- ISelf Collection, United Kingdom
- Prokesz Family Collection, Poland

== Bibliography ==
- Bažantová, Viera – Kvasnička, Marián. Mária Bartuszová. Trenčín : M. A. Bazovský Gallery, 1983
- Beskid, Vladimír. Mária Bartuszová - Cesta k organickej plastike / The Path to Organic Sculpture (1962-1966): Bratislava: Slovak National Gallery, 2005. ISBN 8080590990.
- Dziewańska, Marta (ed.). Provisional Forms. Warsaw : Museum of Modern Art in Warsaw, 2015. ISBN 9788364177262. (including essays by Gabriela Garlatyová, Martina Pachmanová, Anke Kempes, Agata Jakubowska, Briony Fer, Claudia Calirman, Christine Macel, Amanda Sarroff)
- Garlatyová, Gabriela. Lives of the Artists: Maria Bartuszová. In. Tate Etc., Issue 40 — Summer 2017, Publisher Tate Gallery, London.
- Mária Bartuszová - Sculpture Works 1:1962/1987: exhibition catalogue: Exhibition Hall ZSVU Košice - January 1987. Košice: ZSVU, 1988. 63 s.
- Bingham Juliet (ed.). Maria Bartuszová. London : Tate Publishing, 2022. Hardcover, 192 p. ISBN 9781849766777. (including texts by Frances Morris, Juliet Bingham, Gabriela Garlatyová)
