= Jakubovany, Liptovský Mikuláš District =

Jakubovany
- Municipality
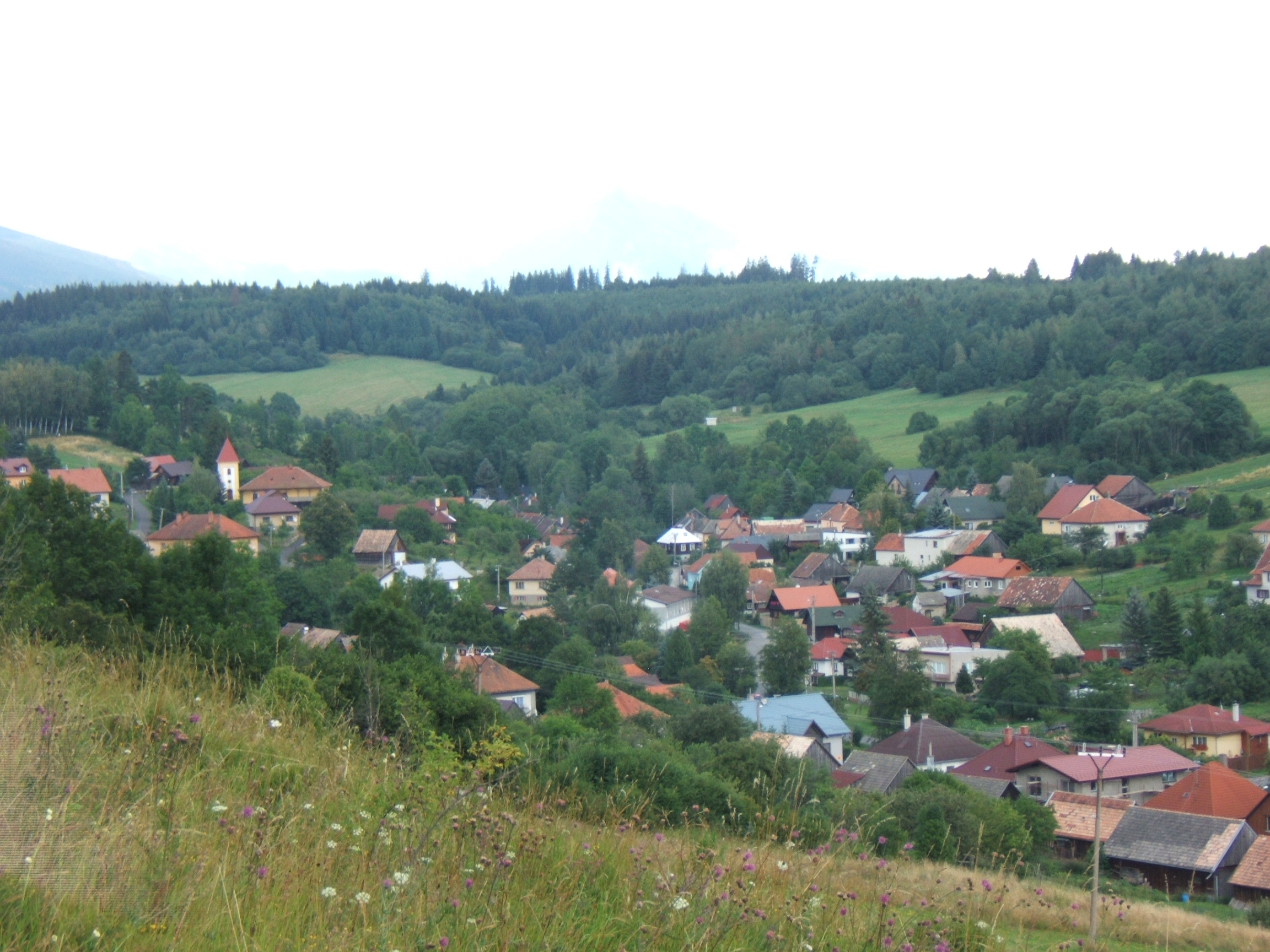

- Flag

- Location of Jakubovany in the Žilina Region Location of Jakubovany in Slovakia
- Coordinates: 49°06′10″N 19°43′25″E
- Country: Slovakia
- Region: Žilina Region
- District: Liptovský Mikuláš District
- First mentioned: 1286

Area
  - Total: 9.10 km^{2} (3.51 sq mi)
- Elevation: 709 m (2,326 ft)

Population (2025)
  - Total: 375
- Time zone: UTC+1 (CET)
  - Summer (DST): UTC+2 (CEST)
- Postal code: 310 4
- Area code: +421 44
- Vehicle registration plate (until 2022): LM
- Website: www.jakubovany.sk

Liptovský Jakubovany (Hungarian: Jakabfalu) is a village and municipality in Liptovský Mikuláš District in the Žilina Region of northern Slovakia.

== History ==
In historical records the village was first mentioned in 1286. Before the establishment of independent Czechoslovakia in 1918, it was part of Liptó County within the Kingdom of Hungary. From 1939 to 1945, it was part of the Slovak Republic.

== Geography ==
The municipality lies at an altitude of 709 metres (2,326 ft) and covers an area of 9.10 km^{2} (3.51 sq mi) (2025).

== Population ==
Population statistic (10 years)
Year	1995	2005	2015	2025
Count	534	427	388	375
Difference		−20.03%	−9.13%	−3.35%

Population statistic
Year	2024	2025
Count	366	375
Difference		+2.45%

It has a population of 375 people (31 December 2025).

=== Ethnicity ===
Census 2021 (1+ %)
Ethnicity	Number	Fraction
Slovak	356	96.21%
Not found out	12	3.24%
Total	370	

In year 2021 was 370 people by ethnicity 356 as Slovak, 12 as Not found out, 1 as Jewish, 1 as Czech, 1 as Rusyn, 1 as Other and 1 as English.

Note on population: The difference values of population numbers in the table "Population statistic" and in the sections "Ethnicity" & "Religion" is caused by the use of various statistical methods.

=== Religion ===
Census 2021 (1+ %)
Religion	Number	Fraction
Evangelical Church	203	54.86%
None	91	24.59%
Roman Catholic Church	50	13.51%
Not found out	13	3.51%
Other	4	1.08%
Total	370	

In year 2021 was 370 people by religion 203 from Evangelical Church, 91 from None, 50 from Roman Catholic Church, 13 from Not found out, 4 from Other, 3 from Greek Catholic Church, 2 from Other and not ascertained christian church, 1 from Jewish community, 1 from Calvinist Church, 1 from Eastern Orthodox Church and 1 from Ad hoc movements.

== Genealogical resources ==
The records for genealogical research are available at the state archive "Statny Archiv in Bytca, Slovakia"

- Roman Catholic church records (births/marriages/deaths): 1729-1895 (parish B)
- Lutheran church records (births/marriages/deaths): 1784-1926 (parish B)

== Notable people ==
- Jana Bodnárová (born 1950), writer

== See also ==
- List of municipalities and towns in Slovakia
