= Jana Bodnárová =

Slovak writer (born 1950)

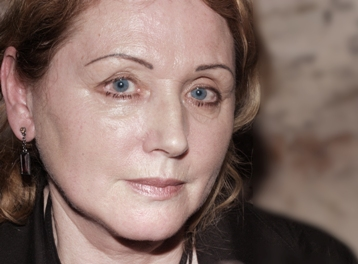
- Born: 21 June 1950 (age 76); Jakubovany, Czechoslovak Socialist Republic
- Education: Comenius University
- Occupations: Writer, art historian
- Spouse: Juraj Bartusz
- Writing career
- Language: Slovak

Jana Bodnárová (born 21 June 1950) is a Slovak writer and art historian.

== Biography ==
Jana Bodnárová was born on 21 June 1950 in the village of Jakubovany to a farming family. Her father operated a small store in the village and was an avid reader of every book he ordered in order to sell in his shop.

She was educated in Liptovský Mikuláš and studied art history, library science and Latin at the Comenius University, graduating in 1976. After graduation she worked as an archivist in Prešov. Gradually, she became established as an important personality of underground culture in eastern Slovakia.

After the Velvet Revolution, Bodnárová began writing full time. Her first notable publication was the 1990 short stories collection Aféra Rozumum (Brain Affair), which won the Ivan Krasko prize. Building on the successful debut, published 22 books for adults and children, winning several national literary acclaims, including three nominations for the Anasoft litera prize (2009, 2019 and 2020). Her books were translated into 8 languages.

According to the philosopher and writer Etela Farkašová, Bodnárová’s prose exhibits certain external features of postmodernism, characterized by fragmentation, the blending of temporal layers, the incorporation of foreign and multilingual subtexts, non-linearity, and kaleidoscopic narration. However, Farkašová notes that Bodnárová’s characters also carry a longing for a hidden, greater whole—seeking harmony, order, and stability—while the boundaries between illusion, fiction, imagination, and "real" life are so blurred that characters often perceive their own (or others’) lives as filmic, and at times find film more real than reality itself.

== Personal life ==
Bodnárová was married to the sculptor Juraj Bartusz. She lives in Košice.
