= Kamenín =

Kamenín Kéménd
- Municipality
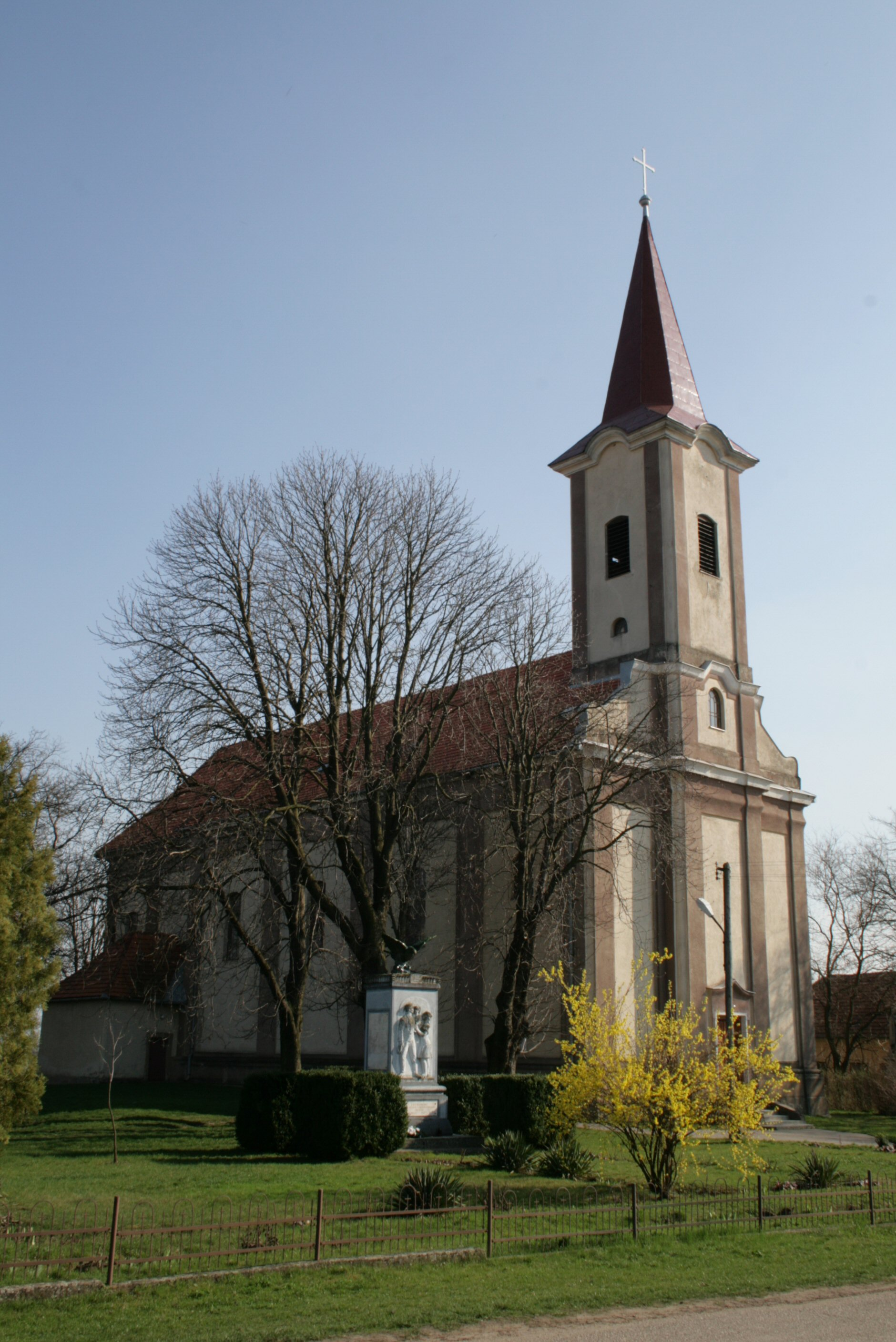

- Flag

- Location of Kamenín in the Nitra Region Location of Kamenín in Slovakia
- Coordinates: 47.89°N 18.64°E
- Country: Slovakia
- Region: Nitra Region
- District: Nové Zámky District
- First mentioned: 1183

Government
  - Mayor: Jozef Grman

Area
  - Total: 28.05 km^{2} (10.83 sq mi)
- Elevation: 125 m (410 ft)

Population (2025)
  - Total: 1,434
- Time zone: UTC+1 (CET)
  - Summer (DST): UTC+2 (CEST)
- Postal code: 943 57
- Area code: +421 36
- Vehicle registration plate (until 2022): NZ
- Website: www.kamenin.sk

Kamenín (Hungarian: Kéménd) is a village and municipality in the Nové Zámky District in the Nitra Region of south-west Slovakia.

== Geography ==
The municipality lies at an altitude of 125 metres (410 ft) and covers an area of 28.05 km^{2} (10.83 sq mi) (2025).

== History ==
In historical records the village was first mentioned in 1183. After the Austro-Hungarian army disintegrated in November 1918, Czechoslovak troops occupied the area, later acknowledged internationally by the Treaty of Trianon. Between 1938 and 1945 Kamenín once more became part of Miklós Horthy's Hungary through the First Vienna Award. From 1945 until the Velvet Divorce, it was part of Czechoslovakia. Since then it has been part of Slovakia.

== Population ==
Population statistic (10 years)
Year	1995	2005	2015	2025
Count	1522	1530	1481	1434
Difference		+0.52%	−3.20%	−3.17%

Population statistic
Year	2024	2025
Count	1438	1434
Difference		−0.27%

It has a population of 1434 people (31 December 2025).

=== Ethnicity ===
Census 2021 (1+ %)
Ethnicity	Number	Fraction
Hungarian	1067	72.14%
Slovak	294	19.87%
Not found out	181	12.23%
Czech	17	1.14%
Total	1479	

In year 2021 was 1479 people by ethnicity 1067 as Hungarian, 294 as Slovak, 181 as Not found out, 17 as Czech, 9 as Romani, 3 as German, 3 as Other, 3 as Albanian and 2 as Ukrainian.

Note on population: The difference values of population numbers in the table "Population statistic" and in the sections "Ethnicity" & "Religion" is caused by the use of various statistical methods.

=== Religion ===
Census 2021 (1+ %)
Religion	Number	Fraction
Roman Catholic Church	1034	69.91%
None	202	13.66%
Not found out	171	11.56%
Calvinist Church	30	2.03%
Total	1479	

In year 2021 was 1479 people by religion 1034 from Roman Catholic Church, 202 from None, 171 from Not found out, 30 from Calvinist Church, 8 from Evangelical Church, 7 from Jehovah's Witnesses, 6 from Christian Congregations in Slovakia, 6 from Greek Catholic Church, 4 from Islam, 3 from Other, 2 from Other and not ascertained christian church, 2 from Czechoslovak Hussite Church, 1 from Eastern Orthodox Church, 1 from Hinduism, 1 from Church of Jesus Christ of Latter-day Saints and 1 from Baptists Church.

The population is about 1179 Hungarian, 250 Slovak and has 29 Romany and 19 Czech minorities.

== Facilities ==
The village has a Hungarian kindergarten and primary school and a DVD rental store.

== Genealogical resources ==
The records for genealogy are available at the state archive "Statny Archiv in Nitra, Slovakia":

- Roman Catholic Church records (births/marriages/deaths): 1724–1895 (parish A)
- Reformed Church records (births/marriages/deaths): 1784–1953 (parish B)

== Notable people ==
- Juraj Bartusz (1933–2025), sculptor

== See also ==
- List of municipalities and towns in Slovakia
