= East Slovak Gallery =

Coordinates: 48°43′11.8″N 21°15′32.7″E

- Východoslovenská galéria
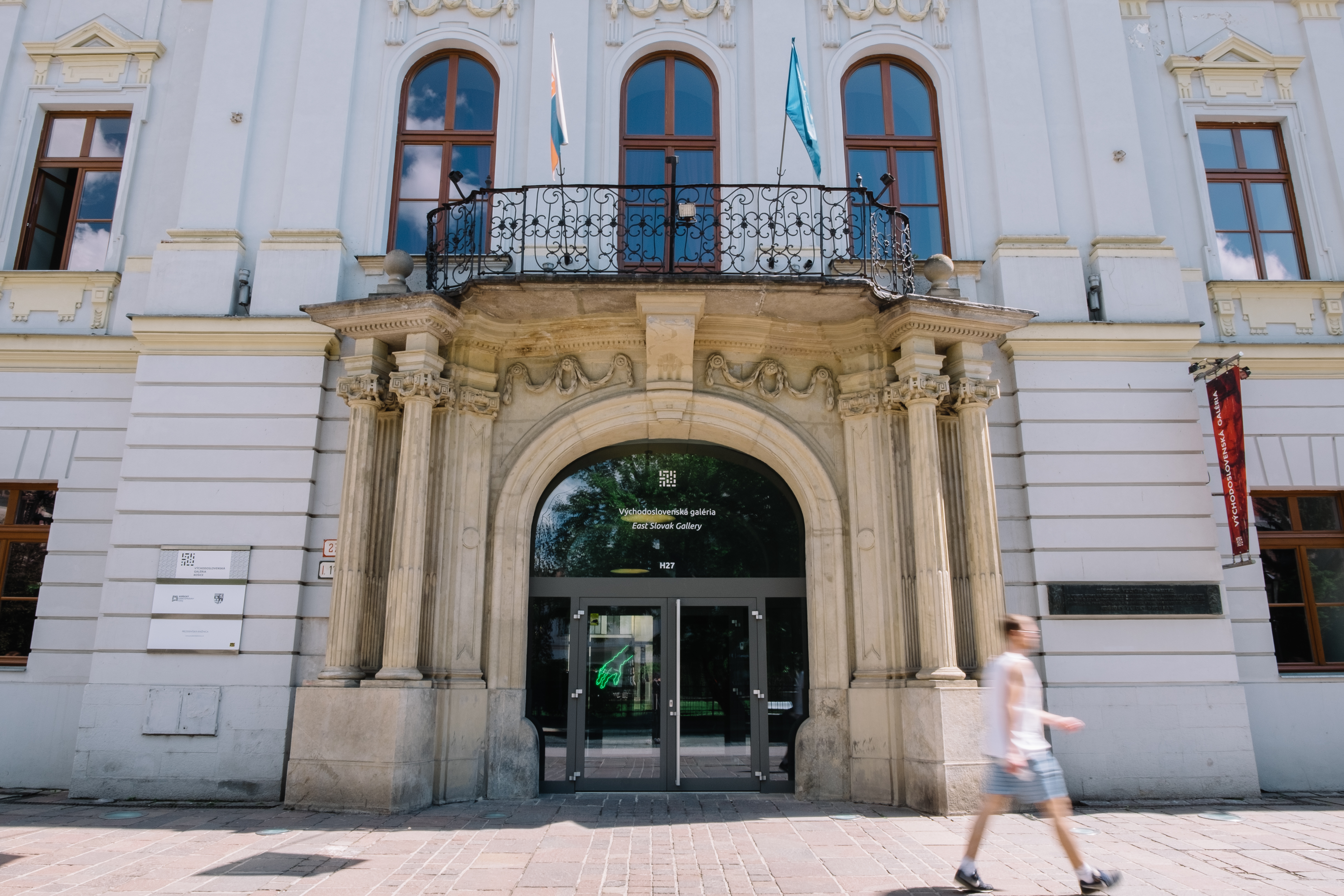
- Východoslovenská galéria
- Location: Východoslovenská galéria Košice, Hlavná 27, 040 01 Košice
- Directors: Mgr. art. Dorota Kenderová, ArtD.
- Website: www.vsg.sk

The East Slovak Gallery, (Slovak: Východoslovenská galéria) established in 1951, was the first regional gallery in Slovakia. The mission of the Gallery is the protection and presentation of the collection and documentation of the art scene and artistic life in the region of Eastern Slovakia.

== Commission ==
Today the Gallery houses over 7,000 works of art. Apart from a representative collection of nineteenth and twentieth century art from the region of Eastern Slovakia, the collection also provides an overview of modern and contemporary Slovak art. In addition to its extensive exhibition activities the Gallery also focuses on research and exploration of art scene in Eastern Slovakia, and especially of Košice modernism, the phenomenon associated with the 1920s characterised by the unusual development of modern art. In its vast premises, the Gallery presents a wide range of Slovak and international art. The accompanying activities such as guided tours, children's workshops or lectures and Library with professional art literature offer great possibilities of spending leisure time directly at the gallery premises.

== Fire ==
The day 12 January 1985 wrote the history of the East Slovak Gallery as an unfortunate event. On that day an extensive fire broke out in its storerooms and destructive flames suddenly transformed hundreds of works of art into cinders and ruin. The fire was caused by leak from a damaged street gas pipe. The fire irreversibly destroyed 1030 works of art.

== The former County House / Hlavná 27 ==
Since 1992 the Gallery has a seat in the building of the former County House. The building in a Baroque and Classicist style, designed by a Vienna-based builder, J. Langer, was completed in 1779. In the period of 1888-1889 the building underwent several alterations: the front part of the house was adjusted, courtly wings were added and the rear wing was modified. On the facade one can see the coat of arms of the Abaúj-Torna County of 1558. Upstairs, there is the assembly hall, the so-called historic hall, with illusive arcades showing the coat of arms of former Abaúj-Torna County as well as some of its towns and villages. It was here that the first cabinet meeting of the National Front of Czechs and Slovaks was held on 5 April 1945, which proclaimed the Košice government programme.

== EHMK 2013 ==
As part of the European Capital of Culture, a section of the gallery was rebuilt in 2013 and a new underground exhibition space was created to serve primarily for the presentation of contemporary art.

== Alžbetina Street 22 ==
Under the administration of the East Slovak Gallery there is also an exhibition space in the building on Alžbetina Street 22 in addition to the space on Hlavná Street 27. A baroque building from the early eighteenth century was modified in a pseudohistorical style towards the end of the nineteenth century.
