= Battle of Piski =

Coordinates: 45°51′09.3″N 23°01′28.4″E

- Part of the Hungarian Revolution of 1848
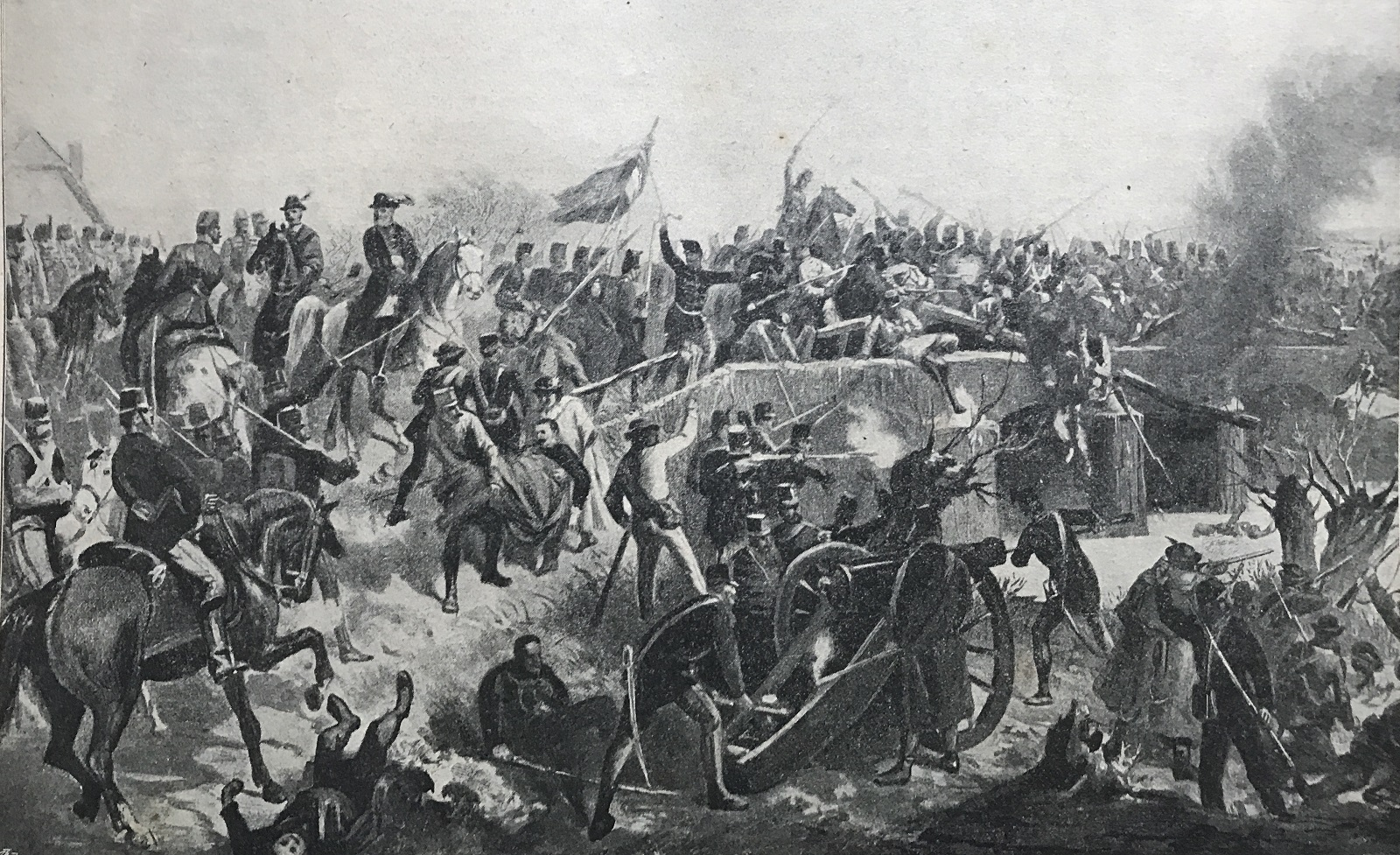
- Battle of Piski - Theodor Breitwieser
Date	9 February 1849
Location	Piski, Hunyad County, Transylvania Kingdom of Hungary (now Simeria, Romania)
Result	Hungarian victory

Belligerents
Hungarian Revolutionary Army	Austrian Empire

Commanders and leaders
Józef Bem	Anton Puchner

Strength
Total: 7,500; 26 cannons Did not participate: 356; 2 cannons	4,035; 24 cannons Did not participate: 4,710; 10 cannons

Casualties and losses
Total: 600–700 men	Total: 705 men 29 horses, 1 cannon

The Battle of Piski was a battle in the Hungarian war of Independence of 1848-1849 fought on 9 February 1849 between the Hungarian army led by the Polish General Józef Bem and the Austrian army of the Habsburg Commander-in-Chief of Transylvania, Lieutenant General Anton Puchner. As a result of the defeats suffered by Bem against the much superior Austrian army, supported also by Romanian and Saxon militias, and a Russian army of several thousand soldiers, the Hungarian army was about to be pushed out of Transylvania. This is why this battle was a crucial one for Bem. And thanks to the reinforcements sent from Hungary, he could stop the Austrian attack at Piski, defeat Puchner, and restart the fight for the province.

== Background ==
On January 21, after a series of victories that liberated much of Transylvania from the Austrian troops except its southern part, Polish General Józef Bem, leader of the Hungarian army of Transylvania, launched an attack on the enemy's headquarters at Nagyszeben but was repulsed by the Imperial troops under Lieutenant General Anton Puchner. Bem was not discouraged by this unsuccess, and on 24 January he repulsed Puchner's troops in the Battle of Szelindek, then retreated to the more defensible Vízakna. Meanwhile, he sent one brigade to cover Székely Land and another to Déva. The Battle of Vízakna was fought on 4 February. Bem first repulsed the attack of the K.u.K. troops, but then began to attack himself. In so doing, he revealed the smallness of his forces and suffered a terrible defeat. He lost 15 guns and all his baggage. With his army reduced to barely 1,500 men, he headed west to contact reinforcements expected from Hungary.

In the meantime, the situation in the other theatres of war was also becoming critical. Therefore, the military council held in Pest on 2 January 1849 decided to concentrate the main forces in the region of the Middle and Upper Tisza for a Spring Campaign, and in order to maximize its chance of success, it concluded, that Bácska and Bánság should be evacuated by the Hungarian troops. The commander of the troops withdrawing from Bánság, General János Damjanich, learned of Bem's defeat at Nagyszeben in Arad, and decided to send part of his army, 3 infantry battalions, 2 cavalry regiments and 12 guns to reinforce Bem. At the beginning of February, the Committee of National Defence (which was acting as a Hungarian government), headed by Lajos Kossuth and based in Debrecen, sent a part of the forces from Zaránd County led by Lieutenant Colonel József Beke to Bem's aid.

However, making contact with these troops was far from easy, as Puchner was pursuing Bem, while the Austrian garrison of Gyulafehérvár and the Romanian popular uprising did everything in their power to put obstacles in Bem's way towards the west. On 6 February, there were further battles at Szászsebes, and on 7 February at Szászváros, in which Bem's troops suffered further losses. In the meantime, at Puchner's request, 4,800 Russian troops came and assured the defense of Brassó and 2,200 in Nagyszeben. Puchner was thus able to use all his expendable forces against Bem.

In addition to these developments, Bem's northern Transylvanian rear was also attacked by Austrian troops when, on 6 February, Colonel Karl von Urban made a lighting raid from Bukovina and took by surprise an advanced Hungarian outpost between Borgóprund and Marossény, capturing without a shot three infantry companies, a platoon of hussars, two cannons and all supplies before retreating back to Bukovina. Urban returned on 12 February with larger troops. At the Battle of Király-németi that followed, the Austrian defeated the Hungarian army under Major Ignác Riczkó, who died during the battle, and occupied the area from Beszterce to Naszód.

== Prelude ==
The last defensible position on the road from Transylvania to Hungary in the valley of the Maros was at the village of Piski in Hunyad County. Here, about half an hour away from the village, the rapids of the river Sztrigy flow into the Mures. The Sztrigy is a river with very inclined banks, which, although not very wide, is difficult to cross. The bridge over the river east of Piski was therefore crucial. A 40-meter-long strong, two-legged wooden bridge, so wide that two carriages could go across it next to each other, crossed the Sztrigy. A wooden bulkhead was placed in the middle of the bridge, with a carriage road running alongside it on both sides.

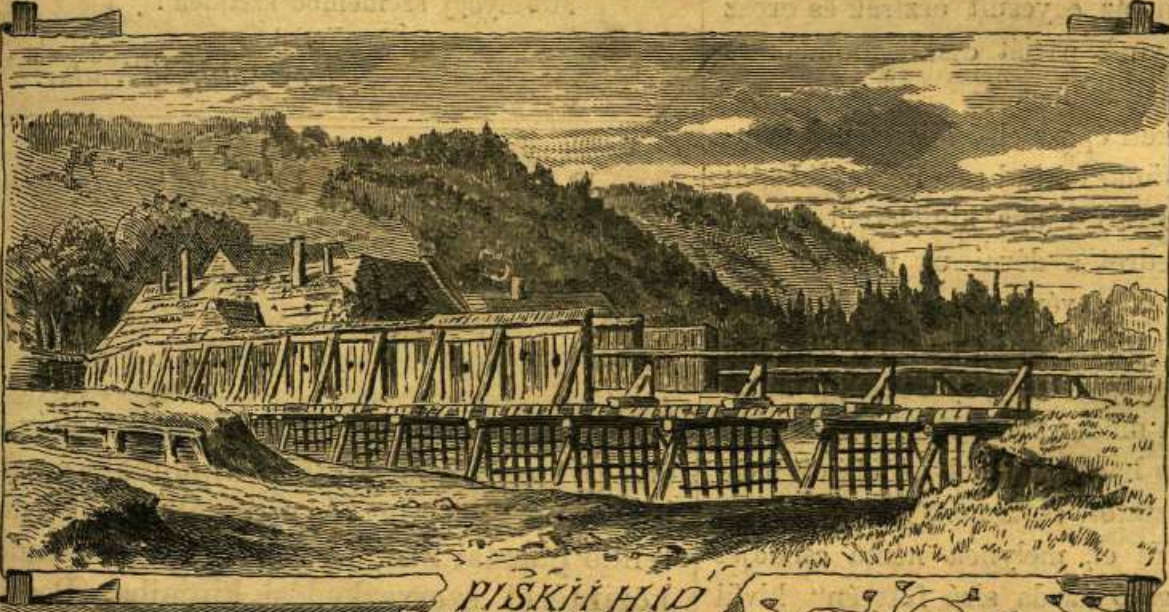
The bridge at Piski (1878)

The village of Piski lies on the right bank of the river, about 100 paces from the bridge. A short distance from the village, on the north side of the highway, stood a spacious stone customs house and a tavern. The road from Szászváros through Pád to Piski runs westwards along the southern slopes of Mount Staramare, but just before the village of Piski, a few steps next to the hill it turns southwards so that the bridge is only visible when the road turns into it. On the right bank, north of the highway, the terrain is all flat, and to the south are the foothills of Mount Magura. The part of the highway, i.e. the part towards the Maros river, rises gently, while the part towards Strigy, i.e. the village, was steep and covered with forest. This mountain dominated the village of Piski and the bridge. Thus, the position was difficult to get around from the north, while to the south - to Vajdahunyad - it was covered by mountains.

The open area north of the highway, about 2,000 paces, was suitable for cavalry charges. There were no houses on the left bank of the river, and here for a width of 600 paces near the bridge, only the willows and bushes provided some cover for the Hungarian side. Most of the left bank was also flat, crisscrossed by ditches, with a mill and a farmstead here and there. Between the villages of Piski and Dédács there were a few gentle slopes towards the Maros.

Near the bridge, the plain on either side of the road was overgrown with willows and scrub for several hundred paces, and there was a farm on either side of the road. The road led through a tree line towards Déva, about an hour and a half away. The elevation on the left bank offered a good position for the Hungarian guns, while the high ground on the opposite bank offered an even better position for the Austrian artillery, being higher than the left bank. The ice was drifting on the Strigy, and, excepting the bridge mentioned above, only at a mill dam south of the bridge was it possible to cross it with both infantry and cavalry.

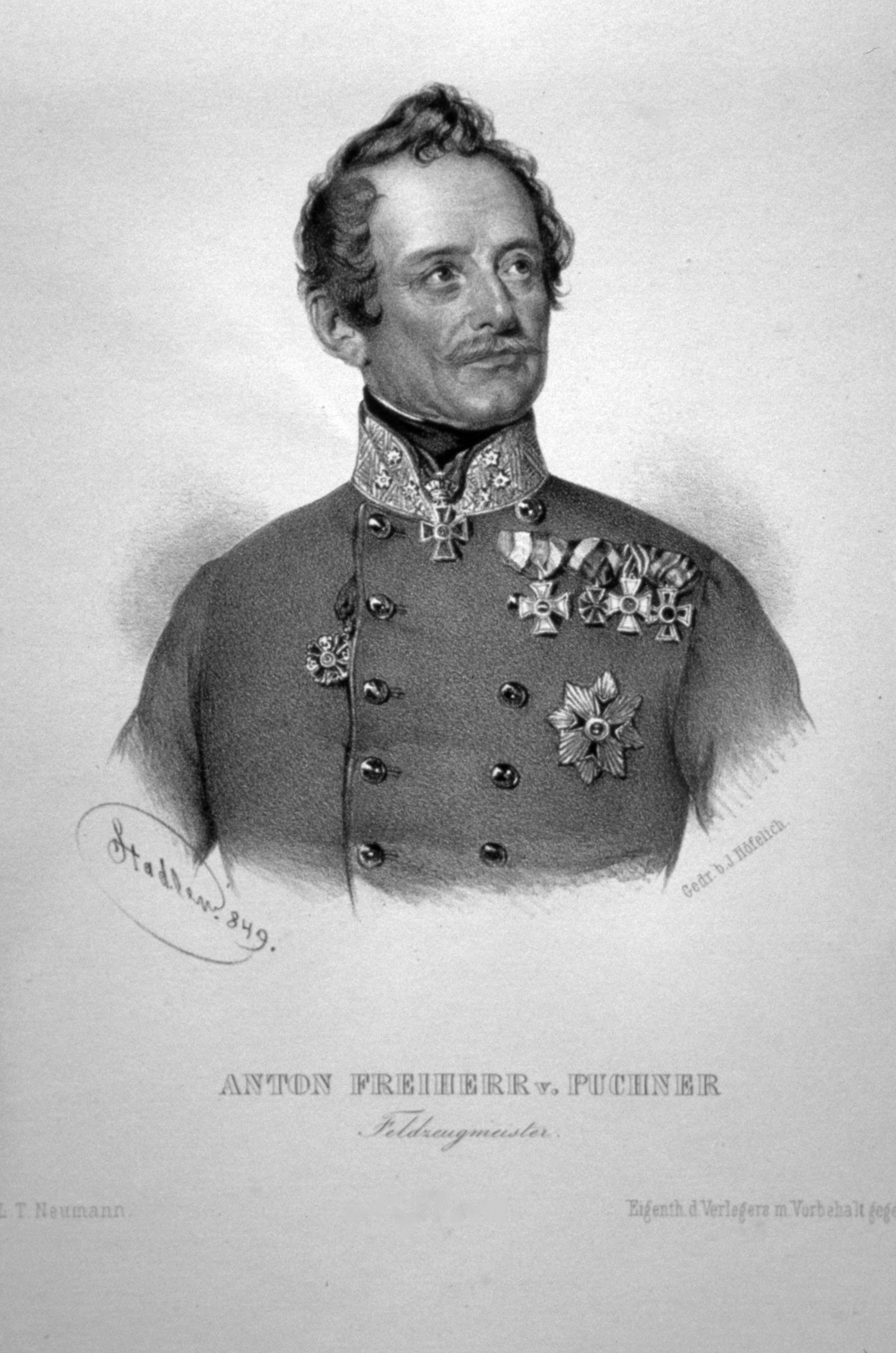
Anton Freiherr von Puchner Litho

Puchner's plan was to encircle Bem's troops between Piski and Déva. To this end, he sent one battalion to Zaránd County to convince the Romanians living there to start an uprising against the Hungarians, and another to bypass Bem's position on the right bank of the Maros. He left a brigade behind in Szászsebes, so that after the destruction of Bem's army, about which he thought that he will achieve it very soon, he could immediately launch it against the Hungarian reinforcements gathering in the area of Medgyes. Puchner was also counting on the detachment led by the Captain of a border guard regiment Czernoević stationing between Déva and Vajdahunyad, as well as the detachment of the Temesvár garrison. However, Puchner was unlucky, because the Temesvár garrison was busy breaking the Hungarian siege of Arad these days.

On the evening of 6 February, after the unsuccessful battle of Vízakna, Bem arrived with his badly battered army in Szászváros, where the next day, attacked again by the pursuing Imperial troops, losing the middle finger of his right hand in the battle, causing him to fall to bed, while the remnants of his army were led to Déva by Lieutenant-Colonel János Czetz, where the relief troops from Bánság had arrived under Major Hrabovszky.

Because Puchner's troops overwhelmingly outnumbered the Hungarians, in the following days the Honvéds performed almost superhumanly, fighting a bloody rearguard action against the Imperials during the retreat, while the Polish commander-in-chief lay virtually incapacitated by his wounds. However, Colonel János Czetz, who temporarily replaced Józef Bem, did an excellent job, and after a few days, the Honvéds were able to join with the auxiliary forces sent by Damjanich, thus increasing the Transylvanian army to 7,000. After that, only one, but more serious task remained: to stop Puchner's troops before they reached the Great Hungarian Plain. This had to be done at a battle fought at Piski.

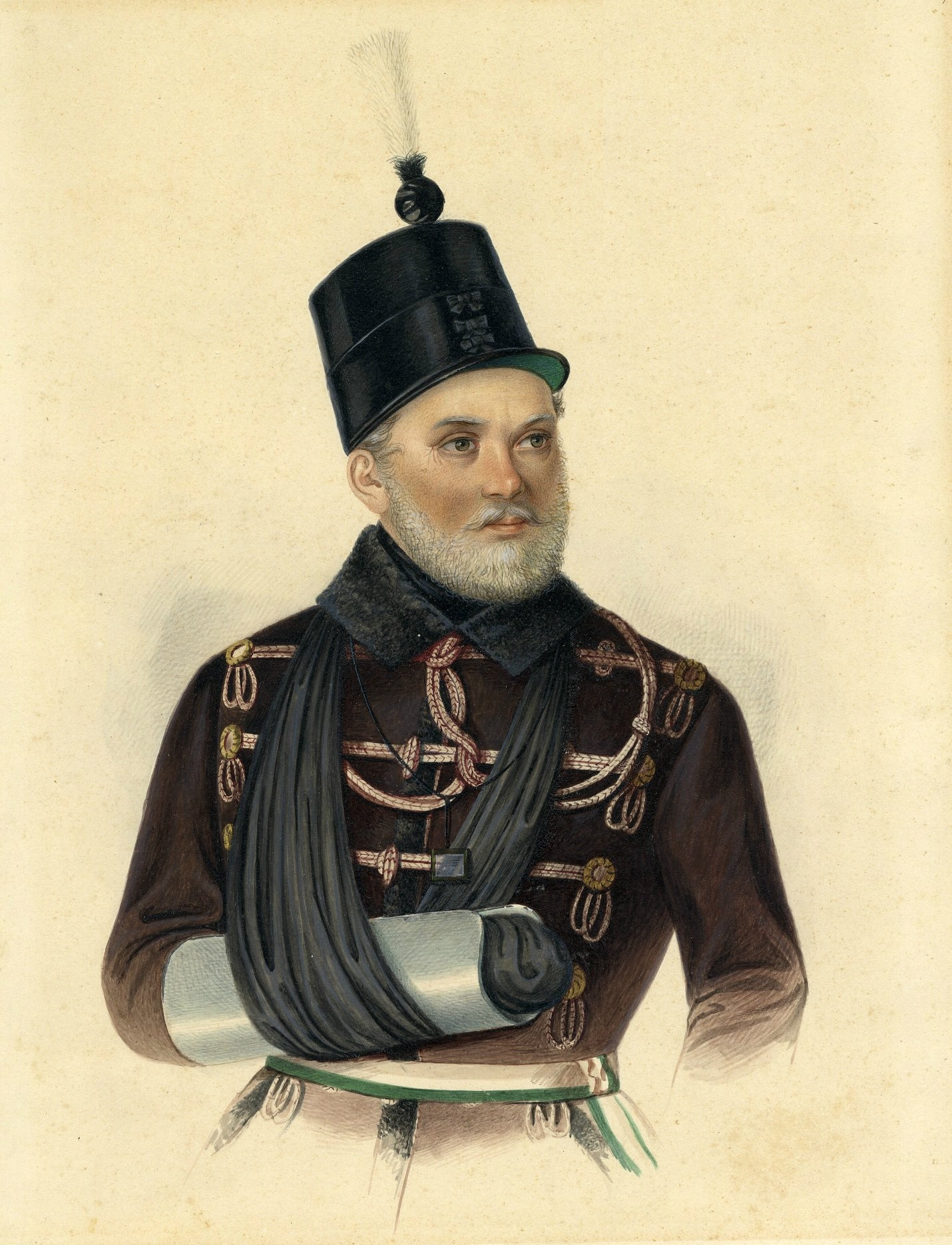
Józef Bem with his bandaged wounds received in the battles of Vízakna and Szászváros (4-6 February 1849)

Bem's retreating army passed through Piski and joined the reinforcements from Hungary at Déva. At the bridge in Piski, he left behind Lieutenant-Colonel Farkas Kemény with the 11th Battalion, two companies of the 15th (Mátyás) Hussars, and 4 guns, who were entrenched in the woods behind the Sztrigy. With this team, he covered Déva, where Bem had retreated. Together with these, and the relief troops from Bánság, Bem's army had now increased again to 10 battalions, 5 regular and 2 irregular cavalry companies and 28 guns. From these, more than 356 men and two cannons had left away before the battle.

When Captain Czernoević heard of the approach of Kemény Farkas on 4 February, he immediately went with his column to Vajdahunyad and from there to Hátszeg, and ordered Prefect Salomon, who was leading the Romanian insurgents remaining at the aforementioned place, to surprise the Hungarians who had marched to Déva with a night raid. This was carried out on the night of 5 to 6 February but was brilliantly repulsed by the Hungarians, who did not enter in panic, and repulsed the attack, so that towards dawn Salomon retreated again to Vajdahunyad, after suffering 180 casualties in the night battle.

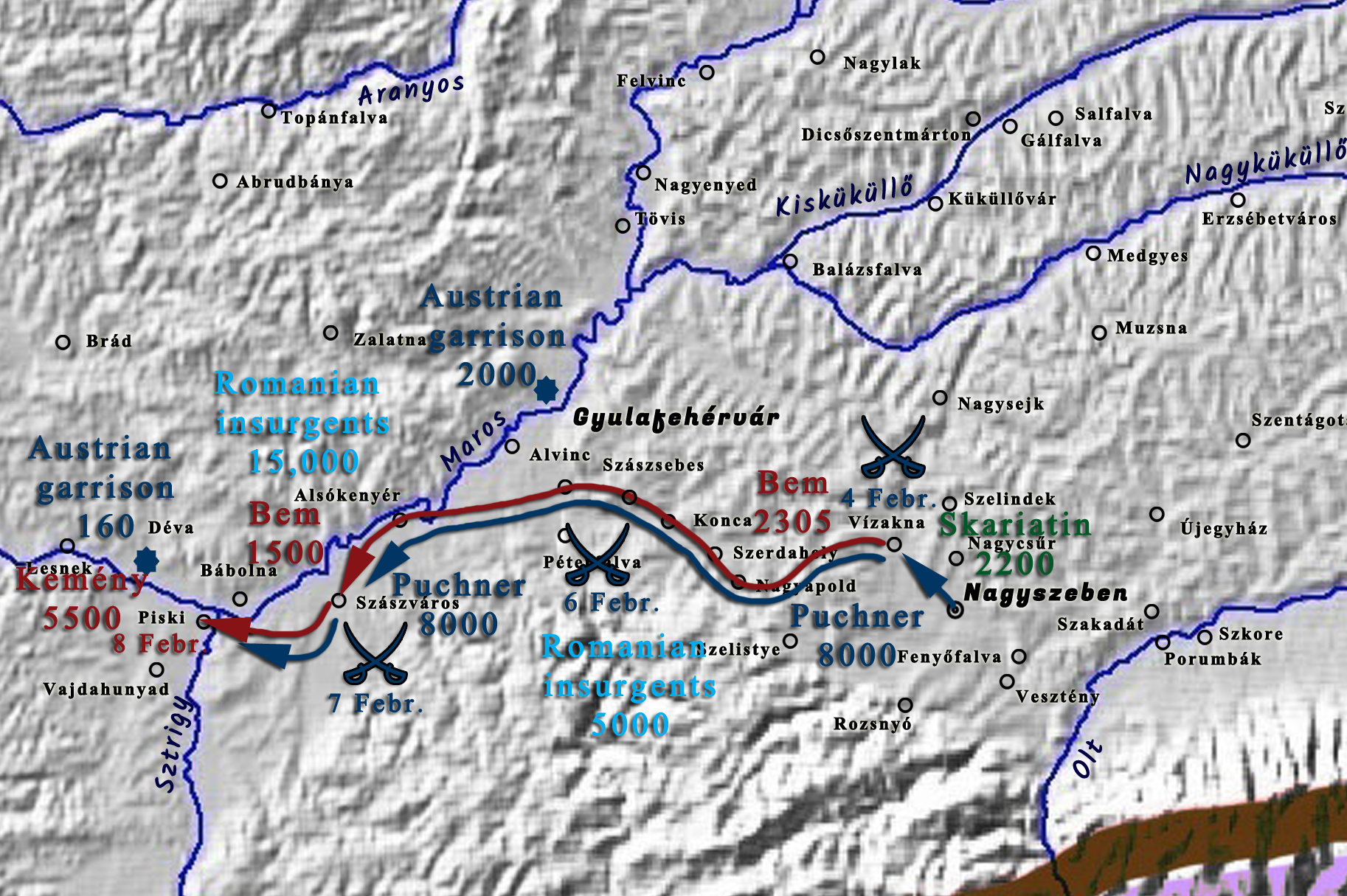
The retreat of the Hungarian army led by Józef Bem from Vízakna to Déva (4 - 7 February 1849)

On 8 February, from the Imperial headquarters in Szászváros, Lieutenant-Colonel Baron Buseck, with the 3rd Battalion of the Sivkovich Regiment, 2 squadrons of chevau-légers, 1 squadron of pro-Austrian Székely Hussars, and 1 battery of three-pounder cannons was sent in reconnaissance against the Hungarian position at Piski, on which occasion Buseck became convinced that the Sztrigy line was very strongly fortified around Piski and that the Hungarians intended to put up a stubborn resistance there. Puchner then decided to attack the next day and entrusted Kalliányi with the task of carrying it through; the detachment of Czernoević and the Karl Ferdinand combined battalion were ordered to participate in the attack at the same time, for which the latter battalion had to cross the frozen Maros at Bábolna to its left bank.

Kalliány had drawn up at the said place 18 guns north of the highway and 1/2 three-pounder batteries south of it, commanded by artillery-captain Herle, and under cover of the 3rd Battalion, Parma Regiment, and 1 division of chevau-légers. The infantry of the Kalliány and Stutterheim brigades were placed in readiness on the heights south of the highway, and ordered to occupy the Piski bridge after a sustained artillery preparation. Major Kunics commanded the left wing of the Austrian battle formation, and Colonel Baron Stutterheim the center. As a reserve, the cavalry under Colonel Losenau was deployed with a 1/2 three-pounder battery at the eastern exit of Pád. On the right bank of the Maros, a large Romanian mass of insurgents and an Austrian cavalry detachment took up position.

Captain Czernoević left Vajdahunyad with his column only at 9 o'clock in the morning, and at noon, arriving at Alsópestes, instead of trying to attack the left flank and rear of the Hungarians, he took up a "lookout position" along the northern edge of the woods to the south-east of the village, and only sent some patrols forward towards the Maros valley; thus in this way he could not influence at all the course of the battle.

The K.u.K. outposts arrived in Pád on 7 February, and the next day they engaged in a skirmish with Kemény's soldiers at the Piski bridge. On 8 February, Kemény, somewhat misjudging the situation, asked Bem for urgent help, saying that the enemy had bypassed his left flank on the other side of the Maros and could surround him at any moment. Bem, lying in bed with a septic fever caused by his recent battle-wounds and by the exhaustion of the past few days, ordered Kemény to defend the position to the last man, saying: If this bridge is lost, all Transylvania will be lost. He was aware that the fate of his army depended on the victory or defeat in this battle, but at the same time, in the event of failure and thus of being driven out from Transylvania, it would have been very difficult to liberate the province again against the superior strength of Puchner's imperial forces, the Russian support troops and the Romanian popular insurgents. At the same time, Kemény sent Colonel János Czetz with a battalion, two cavalry companies, and six guns to Kemény's aid. Czetz positioned his battalion at Dédács, so that the cavalry and the battery were directed against the enemy positions on the right bank of the Maros.

=== Opposing forces ===
The main Austrian force in Transylvania pursuing Bem was commanded, because of Puchner's illness, by General Kalliány. This army encompassed 6 1/2 battalions, 7 companies of cavalry and 4 batteries, about 4,500 infantry, 1,000 cavalry, and 24 artillery. They were supported on the right bank of the Maros by a mass of several thousand Romanian insurgents and a cavalry detachment. In addition, as we have seen above, Puchner could not count on the detachment of 1,700 infantrymen and 40 Seressaners, and 2 cannons, sent in the Maros valley to Déva under Captain Czernoević, or on the combined battalion of Karl Ferdinand' regiment of about 700 men, stationed on the right bank of the Maros opposite Sztrigy's inflow at Arany (today Uroi, part of Piski). At the same time, the large number of Romanian insurgents of several thousand standing at Akmár (near Borberek), Vajdahunyad and Brád also could not be taken into account. With these troops, Puchner wanted to surround Bem between Déva and Piski, but it seems that he underestimated the number of the support troops sent from Hungary, which is why he weakened the attacking column led by Kalliány.

Between Déva and Piski finally the scattered Hungarian troops, retreating from different directions, and the reinforcements sent from Arad and Zaránd county finally could join in an army. These troops formed Bem's army before the crucial battle:

- the garrison of the bridge from Piski under Lieutenant-Colonel Kemény: 900 soldiers, 4 cannons;
- Bem's troops which retreated from Vízakna: 2,100 (+ ?), 4 cannons;
- reinforcements from Zaránd County: 2,150, 7 cannons;
- reinforcements from Arad: 3,000, 13 cannons;

Total: 8150 (+ ?), 28 cannons.
Departed before the battle: 356 (+ ?), 2 cannons. Remained: cc. 7,500 soldiers and 26 cannons.

According to a source, the numerical composition of the different battalions of the Hungarian army was as it follows:

The infantry:

- 11th Honvéd Battalion: 800 soldiers;
- 4th Honvéd Battalion: 700 soldiers;
- 31th Honvéd Battalion: 400 soldiers;
- 55th Honvéd Battalion: 600 soldiers;
- 24th (White Hatted) Honvéd Battalion: 600 soldiers;
- 1st Székely Battalion: 900 soldiers;
- 3d Máriássy Battalion: 800 soldiers;
- Kemény's Battalion: 200 soldiers;
- Torontál national guards: 100 soldiers;
- Arad mobile national guards: 200 soldiers.

Total: 5,600 soldiers.

The cavalry:

- a squadron of Württenberg hussars: 300 soldiers;
- 3 squadrons of Mátyás hussars: 300 soldiers;
- a squadron of the Bihar counted national guards: 400 soldiers;

The artillery:

- 28 cannons of different quality.

== Battle ==
At the beginning of the battle, on 9 February, from 8 o'clock in the morning, the artillery of the two sides shot at each other, and soon the imperial batteries hit two Hungarian guns. Kemény then withdrew his troops further back, leaving only one company at the bridgehead. Then some of the infantry units of the Kalliány brigade started a bayonet attack against the bridge but they were repulsed. Then the 11th Honvéd Battalion counter-attacked, crossing the bridge, some of them went through the icy water, which was almost up to the waist of the soldiers, and started to chase the retreating Imperials. The advancing Honvéds soon took control of 2 cannons, which had been captured by the enemy from them in the battle of Nagyszeben. Soon, however, the infantry of the Kalliány Brigade went on the counter-attack, with a 1/2 Transylvanian kaiserjäger and one Bianchi battalion in the first line of battle and the other Bianchi battalion in the second, causing to the Hungarian defenders who tried a stubborn resistance at the mouth of the bridge heavy losses, forcing them to withdraw behind the Sztrigy, whereupon Captain Herle, sending his artillery forward, deployed one battery on the river bank to the right of the bridge and the other to the left. The remainder of the two brigades moved forward in a similar manner, with the cavalry on the right flank deploying along the Maros. Kemény was therefore forced to move the infantry back. However, after realising that he had made a mistake in pulling his troops back, he decided to try to retake his original position. To relieve the pressure, he sent a company of Hussars to attack the bridge. This went against all military considerations, and the company's commander, Captain Miklós Horváth, died a heroic death, but the imperial advance was stopped. The cavalry stampeded the enemy on the bridge, which made it possible for the 11th Battalion to break through the bridge with a bayonet charge, pushing back the Austrians, and then returned to the Hungarian side of the river. Meanwhile, the Imperial Infantry tried to cross the river at the mill dam but was prevented by a company of Honvéds.

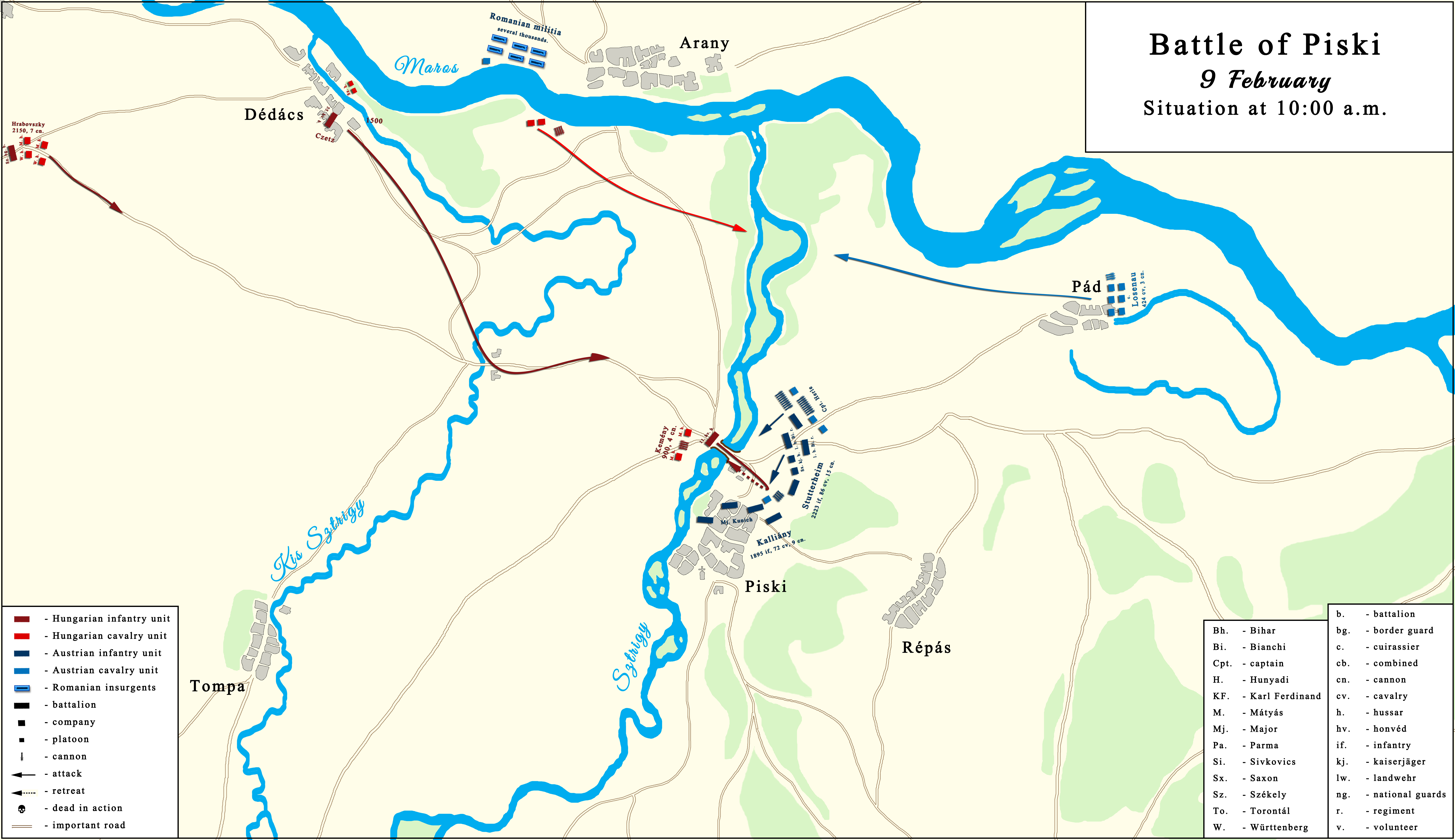
Battle of Piski 9 February 1849. Situation at 10 a.m

At this critical moment, arrived Czetz with his relief troops from Dédács on the battlefield and immediately led them towards the bridge. The first who arrived on the battlefield was the partly inexperienced 55th Battalion, with only two companies that had so far taken part in a serious combat. The battalion arrived just in time, as the reinforced enemy infantry launched another attack across the bridge. According to Miklós Szigethy's memoirs, the companies of the 11th Battalion near the bridge immediately charged the advancing enemy infantry. Already on the march, the 55th Battalion split into a skirmish line, and they advanced to the river bank from the cornfield which was right to the 11th Battalion. At the same time, or shortly afterward, the 3rd Battalion of the 37th (Máriássy) Infantry Regiment, the Torontál Volunteer Mobile National Guard Battalion, and the 24th Honvéd Battalion, which had been deployed to the left of the bridge, arrived on the battlefield under the command of Major György Hrabovszky. Left from them, in the extreme left flank were deployed 2 or 3 companies of the Mátyás Hussars, 2 companies of the Württemberg hussars, as well as a unit of Székely border guards.

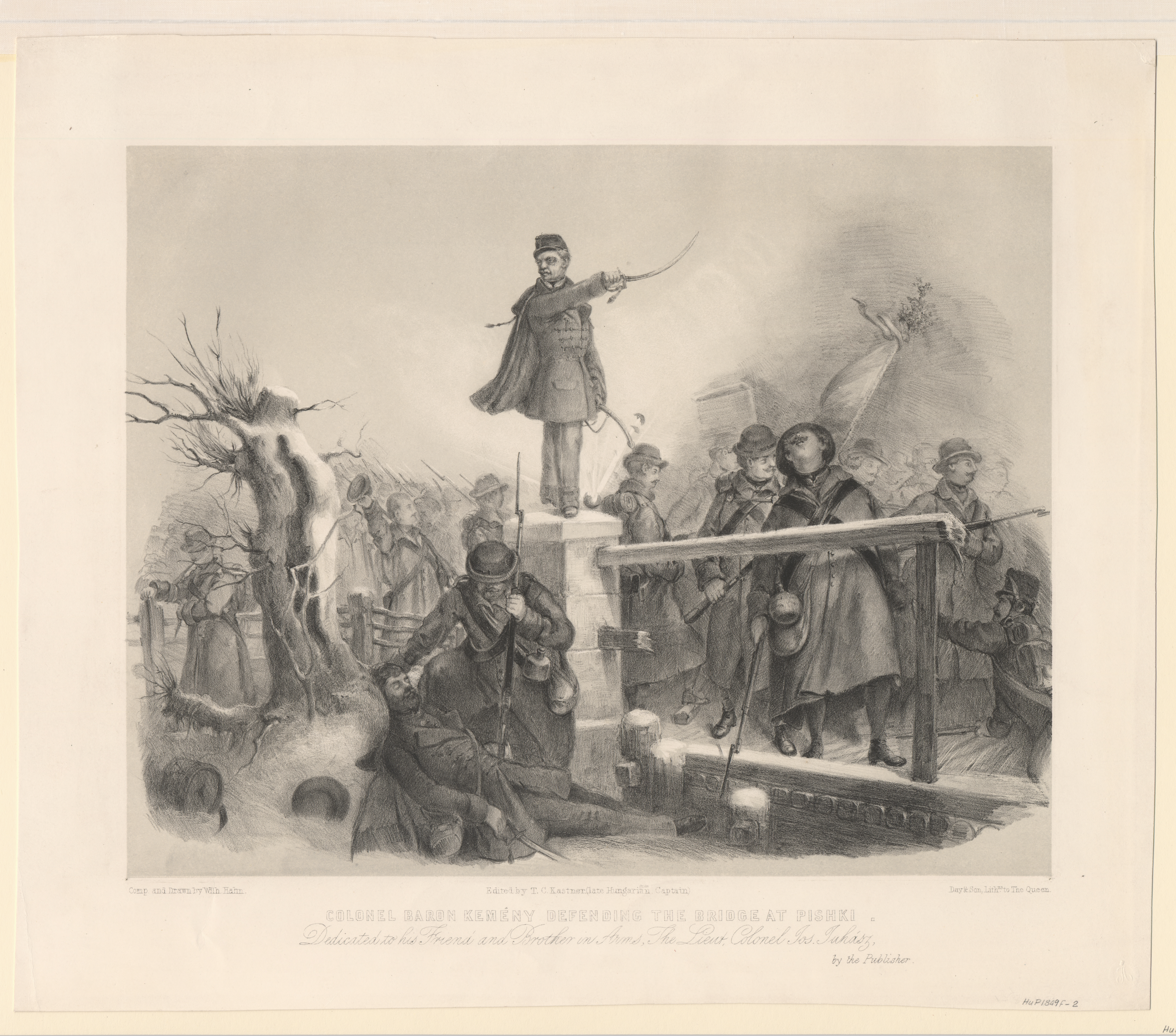
Colonel Baron Kemény defending the bridge at Pishki (1852)

Since the Hungarians now had five battalions on the battlefield, the opposing imperial troops were subjected to heavy pressure. The 11th and the Máriássy Battalion together stormed the enemy which was crossing the bridge, and after a close fight, they started to push the enemy across the bridge again. The K.u.K. Bianchi Infantry Battalion which was on the bridge was surprised by the sudden attack and, unable to escape (half of the bridge being dismantled), it mixed up with the attackers. At this moment took place the most controversial episode of the battle, for which each side accused the other of oathbreaking.

Some soldiers of the enemy battalions began to wave white bandanas and fraternize with the soldiers of the Máriássy battalion, who still wore the white uniforms of the Imperial Regiments. In addition to this, neither the soldiers of the Austrian Bianchi infantry regiment from Puchner's army fought against the Hungarians, nor the Máriássy battalion, which had fought against the Serbs in Southern Hungary, fought against the Austrians before. One of the K.u.K. battalions was made up of Poles from Galicia, and the Máriássy family served in this province for a long time. As Polish soldiers and units had joined the Hungarians before, the latter must have thought that a similar situation was developing again.

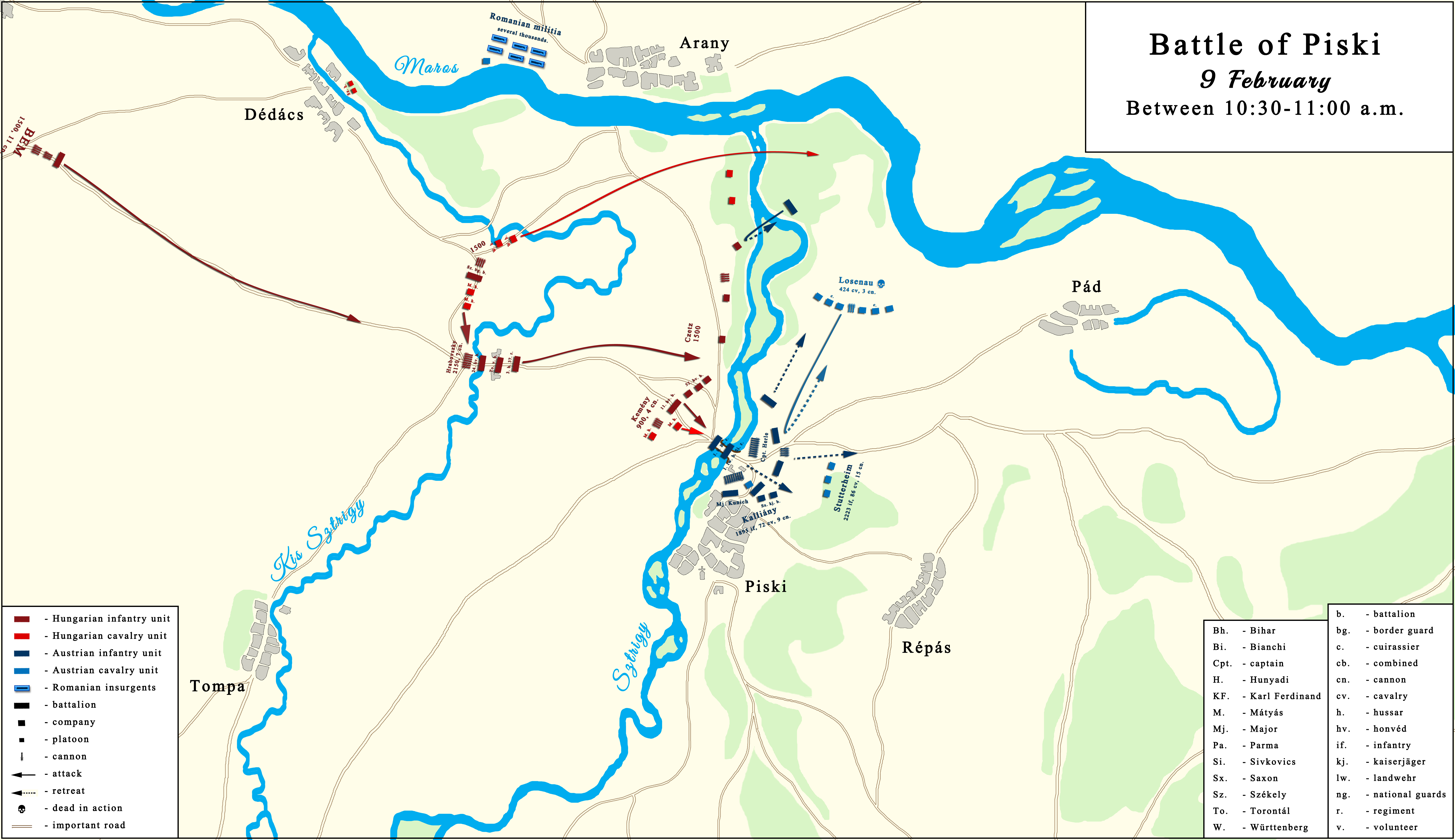
Battle of Piski 9 February 1849. Situation between 10.30 and 11.00 a.m

They must have believed this, if only because after the battle of Vízakna, when the Austrians captured the documents found in General Bem's private carriage, they also found a daily order about the fraternization of the Bianchi infantry regiment to the Hungarians. In this general order it was written: If during the battle people from the enemy approach with a white flag, they must be received in a friendly manner. The privates who had defected from the Polish soldiers of the Bianchi regiment, as well as those captured in battle, claimed that the whole Bianchi regiment wanted to fraternize with the Hungarians, but that there was no opportunity for it; and during a battle, it was difficult, because the Hungarians could not know that they were approaching with friendly intentions, and because of this they could kill them. At this favorable news, Bem sent back to the Imperials some Polish soldiers who earlier deserted to the Hungarian side from the Bianchi regiment, to act as they had fled back from the Hungarians, but with instructions to inform, in secret, their comrades from the Bianchi regiment that the Hungarian honvéds would respect the white badge if, during the battle, they would try to defect to them. In the aforementioned general order, Bem advised his soldiers to not harm those enemy soldiers who .show them white flags. So when the soldiers of the Bianchi regiment rose the white shawls, the Hungarians on the bridge thought that the Polish soldiers of the Bianchi battalion wanted to defect, but this was probably a ruse on Puchner's part, who wanted to use Bem's plan, of which he had learn from his captured documents, to confuse the Hungarians and capture their officers.

Lieutenant Colonel Farkas Kemény and Colonel Czetz, noticing the pause in the fighting and the soldiers waving white flags, went among them. They saw that Hungarian and imperial officers shook hands, some of them approached Kemény, said that they were not enemies but comrades, grabbed his horse's bridle and asked him if he was Bem? Then he became suspicious, and with great difficulty he slipped out from among them and went back to his soldiers. They also tried to catch Czetz also. According to the Imperials, the Hungarians tried to capture the Imperial officers. In the meantime, the 24th Honvéd Battalion arrived on the battlefield, which did not know what to think of the cessation of fighting among the white-coated crowd on the bridge (as mentioned above both the Bianchis and the soldiers of the Hungarian Máriássy regiment wore white coats), and fired into them. This caused a disturbance among the Máriássy, surprised that they received fire from their comrades, and this was used by the enemy Infantry to push them off the bridge. Soon, however, the Hungarian superiority in numbers prevailed. A few companies of the 11th Battalion, a battalion of the Máriássy Regiment and the first company of the Mátyás Hussars took back the bridge from the soldiers of the Bianchi and Sivkovich Regiments. After a firefight lasting a few minutes and a short hand-to-hand fight, which cost the enemy 10 officers dead and wounded, among them Colonel Losenau, who rushed forward from the reserve, but he was mortally wounded. Of the imperial soldiers, 200 were killed or wounded, and the Austrians lost 1 gun. The cannon in question had been lost by the Hungarians in the battle of Vízakna and was now recovered. The fight continued also on the other bank of the river, the Hungarians storming and capturing the inn from Piski.

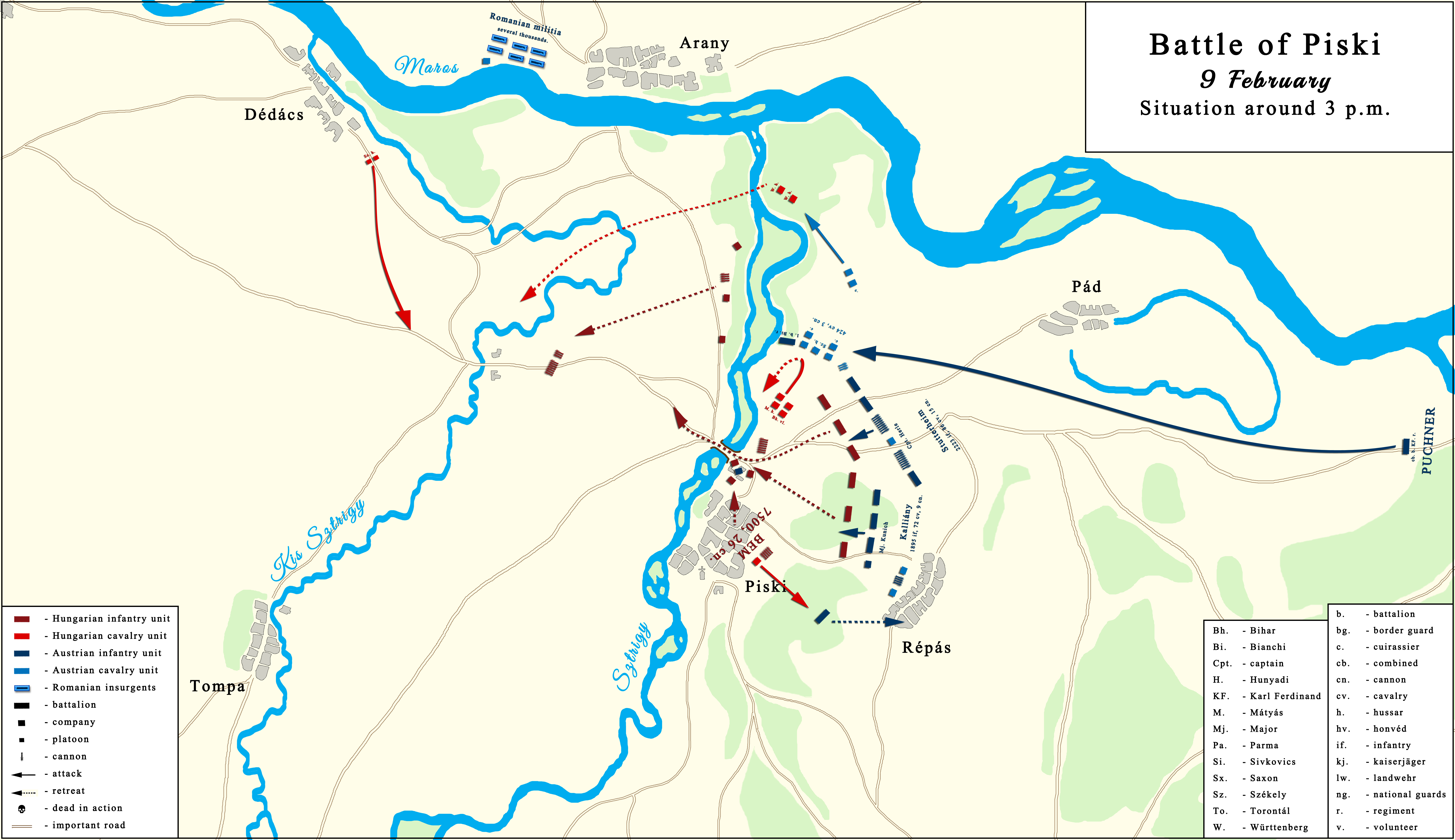
Battle of Piski 9 February 1849. Situation around 3 p.m

It was then that Bem arrived on the battlefield. He immediately arranged for the artillery to be moved to the right bank, sent the cavalry on the charge, and arranged for the 11th Battalion, which had been fighting since the morning, to be relieved. He reorganized the 11th and 55th battalions sending them to attack, and later he sent also the two batteries that were next to him, to the opposite bank of the river; while the Württemberg Hussars and the Székely battalion crossed over to the opposite bank at the confluence of the Sztrigy and the Maros, where the whole army was deployed in formation under the command of Major Hrabovszky and Major Dobay, who had been assigned to the right wing. Even before this happened, Bem noticed that a K.u.K. battalion was trying to bypass the Hungarian right flank on the heights above Piski. Having already sent all his cavalry forward, he ordered József Egyed, the Lieutenant of the Mátyás-Hussars, to attack the battalion with "all kinds of hussars" (obviously the commanders of the headquarters staff) accompanying him. Egyed hesitated, obviously not understanding the point, but Bem urged him to hurry. The Hussars charged the battalion, which took an Infantry square position (this was a usual way to repel a cavalry charge); then Bem, with the fire of his five guns, smashed the battalion, which fled, leaving many dead and wounded on the field. Bem smiled after the successful action and said, Do you see the Austrian tactics?

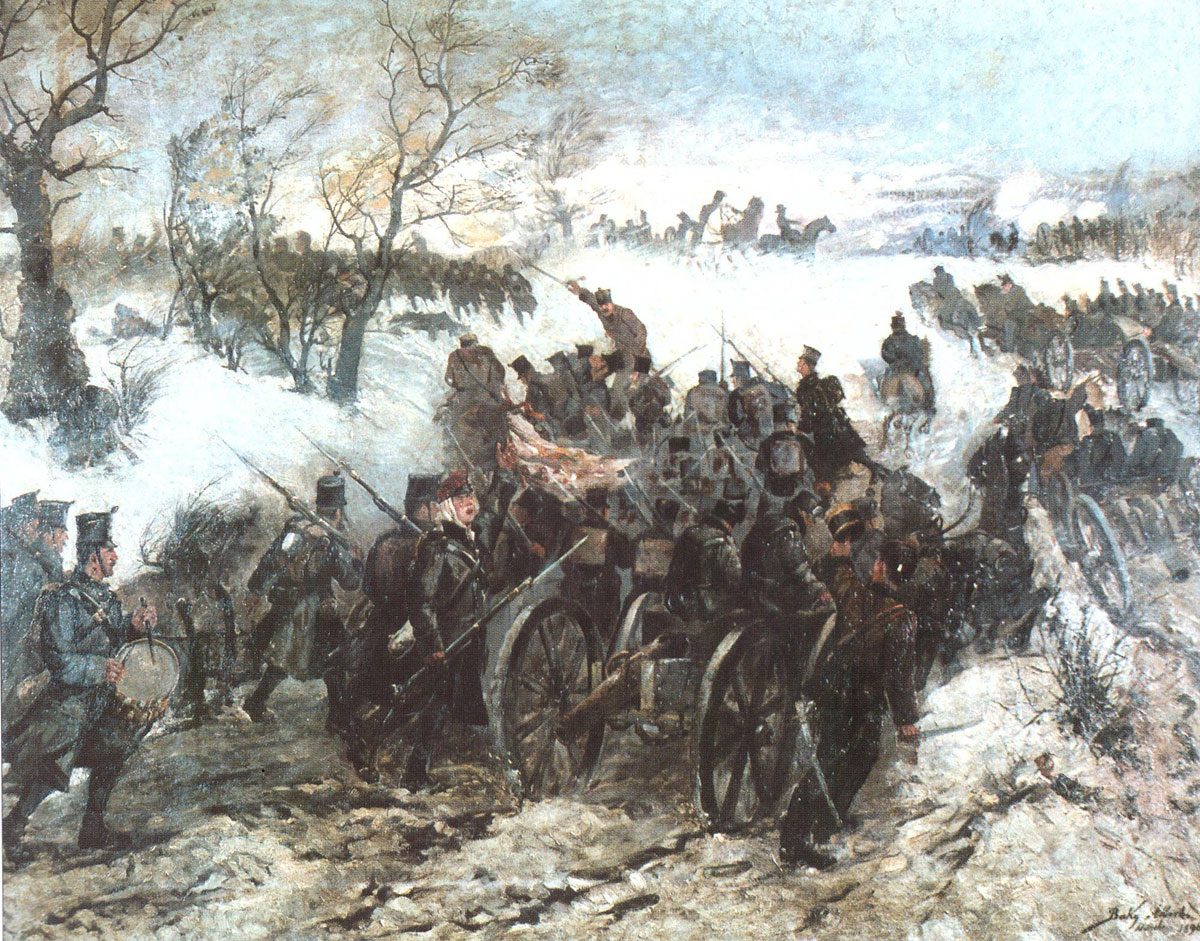
Battle of Piski by Baky Albert (1889)

As the Imperial troops were already retreating along the whole line to Pád along the highway, Bem ordered a general attack. To avert the imminent danger, Kalliány threw a squadron of cuirassiers in front of the pursuers, but the Württemberg Hussars soon repulsed it; then the bulk of the Imperial cavalry, under the command of Lieutenant-Colonel Baron Buseck, consisting of two squadrons of cuirassiers and the Székely Hussar company, went on the attack, supported also by the fire of one of the Bianchi battalion. The Mátyás Hussars were sent to meet them, followed by the mounted Bihar volunteers; but before the cavalry fight could begin, the Hungarian cavalry, and especially the Bihar volunteers, started to flee by the well-aimed shots of the enemy infantry and the cannonballs that hit them, causing also the nearby infantry to flee.

The rotation of the infantry troops also went badly; the changing of battered troops with new ones was seen by many as a retreat, and seeing the cavalry too on retreat, a panic broke out in the army, and the troops started to fall back in disorder across the bridge. Around this time the combined Karl Ferdinand battalion also arrived on the battlefield from the right bank of the Maros, led personally by Puchner, who came from Sászváros. Now the Austrian commander personally led this battalion to attack Bem's right wing, which was stationed on the heights, and drove it back, so that the whole Hungarian battle line began to break up at about 3:30 p.m. Many soldiers were jamming together on the bridge, while others tried to swim across the flooded Sztrigy River, many of them drowning. Bem alone has not lost his presence of mind. On the one hand, he ensured the passage of the artillery across the bridge, and on the other, he pleaded with tears in his eyes to his soldiers. I need this bridge, or I want to be killed in the battle. Do not run Hungarians, do not run Hungarians! Without this bridge, the homeland will be lost! But he could not stop his troops fleeing here. The tide of the fleers carried him across the bridge, and he saw the victory that he saw so close a little earlier, snatched from his grasp again. The Honvéds massed around the bridge suffered terrible losses from the enemy infantry and artillery fire, and the fact that most of the artillery did not fall into the hands of the Imperial Army was due to the self-sacrificing intervention of the Württemberg Hussars.

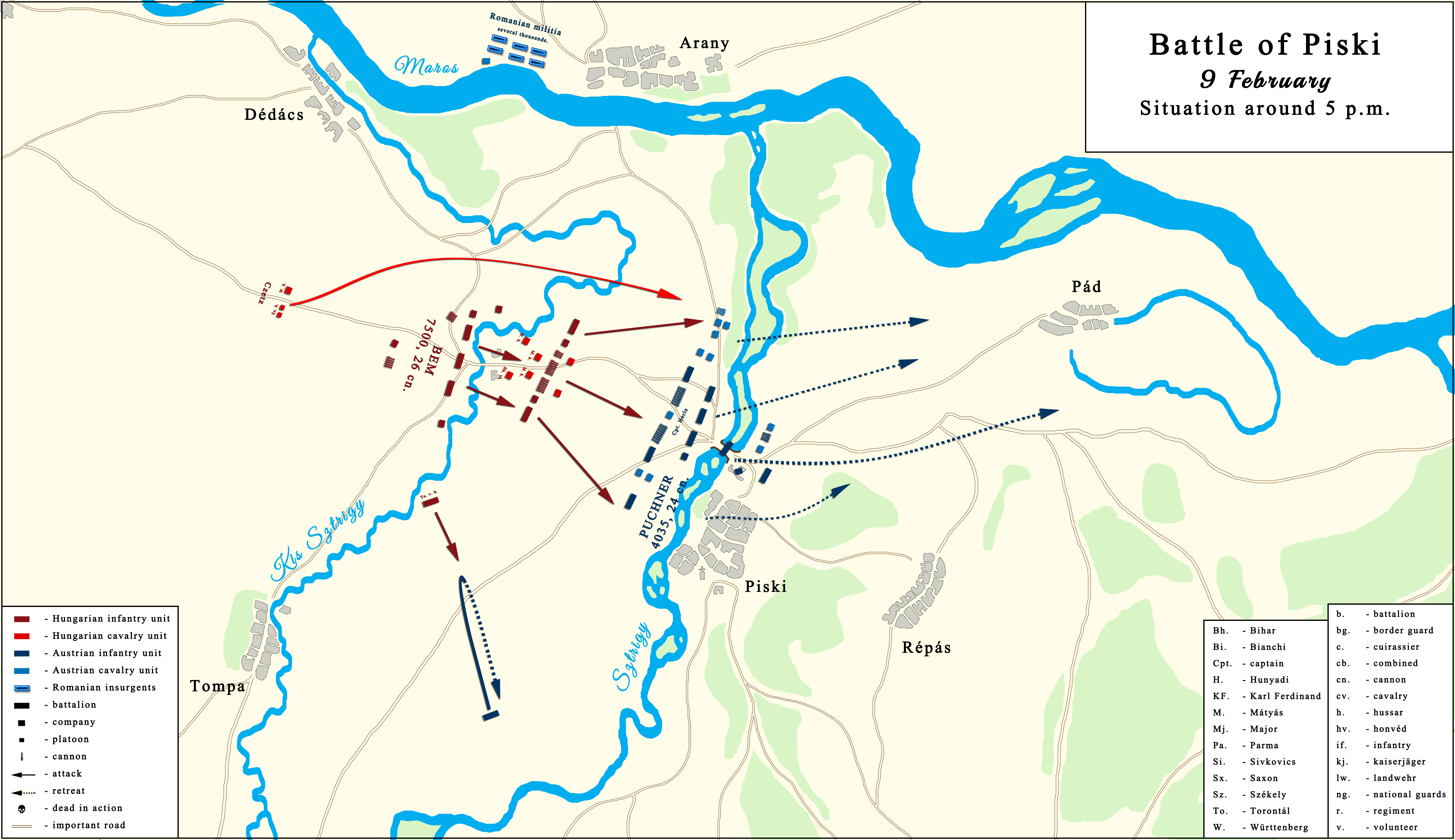
Battle of Piski 9 February 1849. Situation around 5 p.m

If Captain Czernoević, instead of standing idle in the forest of Pestes, and would have appeared on the left and the rear of the retreating Hungarians, or if Puchner had not dispersed his forces before the battle, but had attacked the bridge with all or most of them at Piski, Bem's army would undoubtedly have been completely destroyed. But because he scattered his troops, now he saw that there are no reserves for the final attack. In order to inflict even greater losses on the Hungarian army, which he believed to be completely disintegrated, Puchner decided to send his artillery over the Sztrigy, but for this, he had to rebuild the partially destroyed bridge. But with this, he lost time by sending his sappers to rebuild the destroyed parts of the bridge, to make it crossable for the cannons. Thus Czetz had time to stop the routing Hungarians, who were not pursued by the Austrians, already on the Dédács-Szentandrás line, which was made possible mainly by the fact that the two Szekler platoons left behind at Dédács to keep an eye on the Romanian popular insurgents from the right bank of the Maros, together with the Württemberg Hussars, drew a cordon on the said line, and they made it clear that those who cross it, will be killed. Another cause of the running troops' stopping, was that they ran out of breath, so they finally stopped running and were easier to regroup. Thus, in less than half an hour, the battle order was restored, so that it crossed almost perpendicularly the main road to Déva; behind the line of battle formed by infantry and artillery were the Mátyás Hussars, behind the latter's left with the Württemberg Hussars and behind their right, the Bihar National Guard cavalry were positioned.

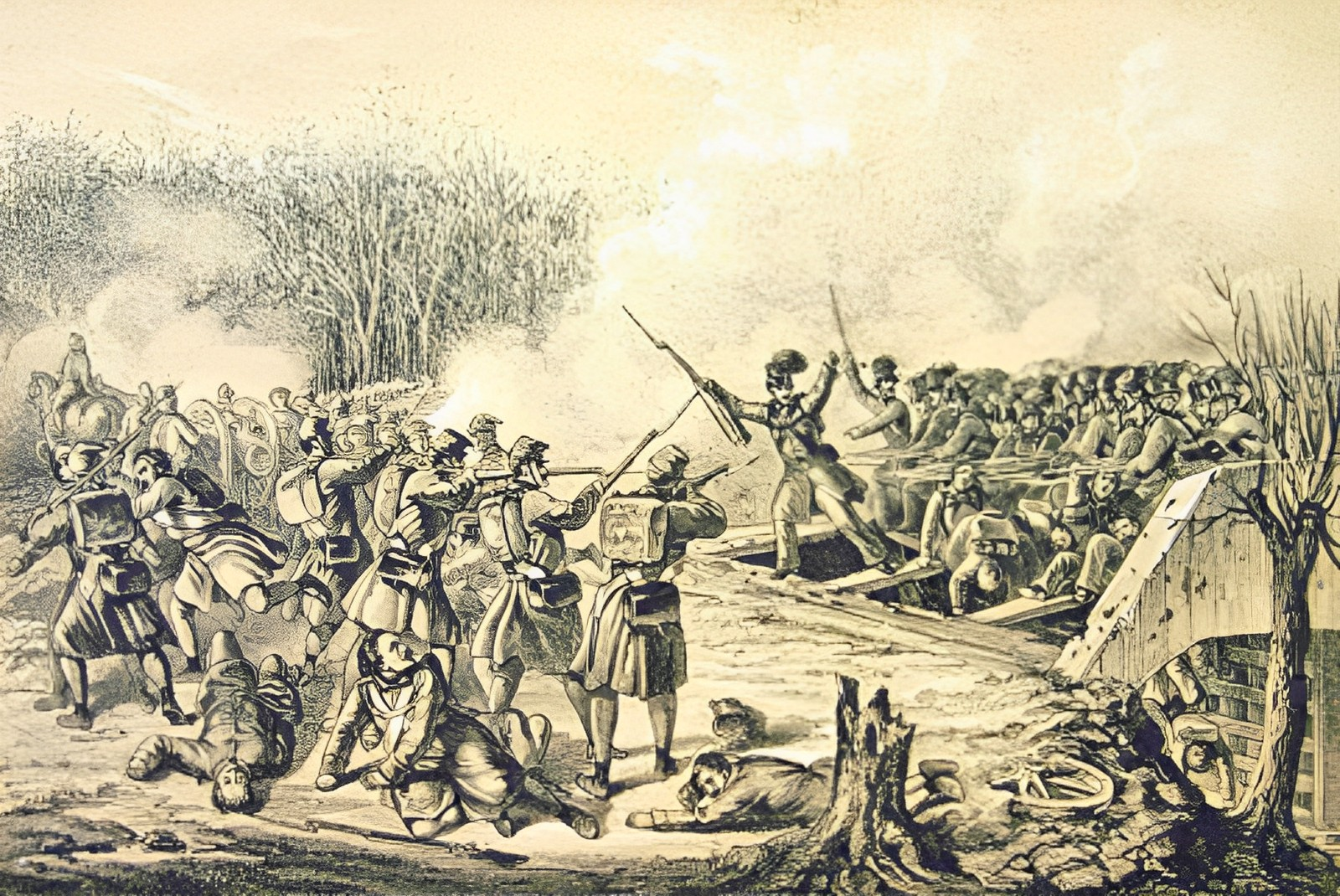
Attack against the bridge at Piski by the Saxon Jäger Battalion - Carl Hann von Hannenheim

So, when Puchner's troops crossed the bridge and began to take up the battle position, they were again faced with ordered Hungarian troops. Puchner wanted to crush them, so he ordered a tremendous artillery barrage on them from his guns. But with this he had exhausted his ammunition to such an extent that the Imperial guns were shot lesser and lesser towards evening. Bem returned the Imperial fire only at longer intervals, but then, noticing that the enemy was trying to bypass his right flank from the direction of Nagyarbarcsa, he ordered the Torontál battalion to reinforce the endangered flank. It soon became clear, however, that the enemy's encircling movement at dusk was only to deceive the Hungarians, and in view of the great exhaustion of his troops and the shortage of ammunition, both among the artillery and the infantry, Kalliány soon gave the order to stop the battle and begin the retreat. Bem, the old cannoneer, noticed this, and when the imperial guns fell silent, he sent his infantry on the attack. The Honvéds first drove the Imperials over the bridge, then recaptured the inn, and then cleared the whole village. Bem's troops drove the enemy through Pád towards Szászváros, causing great losses to the almost fleeing enemy. However, because of their final exhaustion, the troops were unable to pursue with sufficient vigour to deal a devastating blow to the fleeing enemy.

== Aftermath ==
According to József Bánlaky, the Austrians lost 4 officers and 125 men killed; 8 officers and 381 men wounded; 2 officers and 141 men missing; and only 1 officer and 22 men captured; 15 officers and 669 men, in total 684 men, According to Róbert Hermann, the imperials lost 128 dead, 390 wounded, 164 missing and 23 prisoners, for a total of 705 men, 29 horses and one gun. The Hungarian casualties were also approximately the same, about 670-700 men.

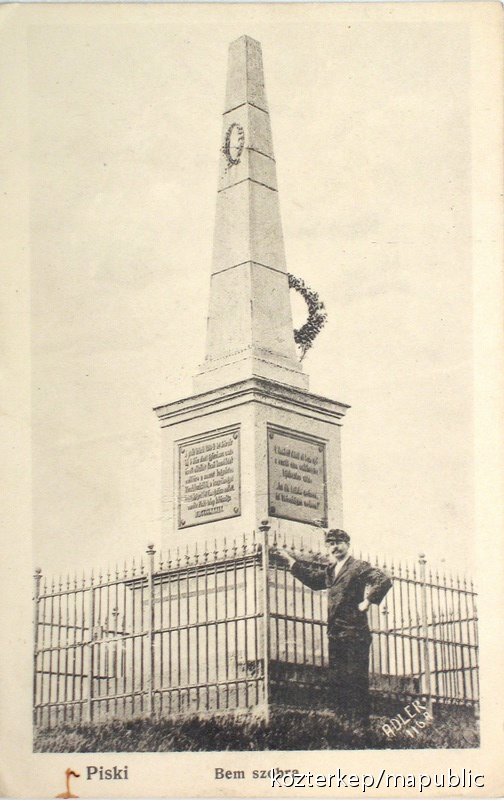
The monument of the Battle of Piski. Tódor Berczy. Demolished after 1920

What was the explanation for the Hungarian success and the imperial failure? The latter is easier to explain. Puchner has miscalculated the number of Hungarians, or rather, he became overconfident in himself. After Bem's four-day retreat and the losses he suffered in the process, he could not believe that the Hungarian leader would be able to turn the tide of the war. There is hardly any other explanation for leaving three battalions of infantry, three and a half companies of cavalry, and the most valuable part of his artillery, the twelve-pounder battery, in Szászsebes.

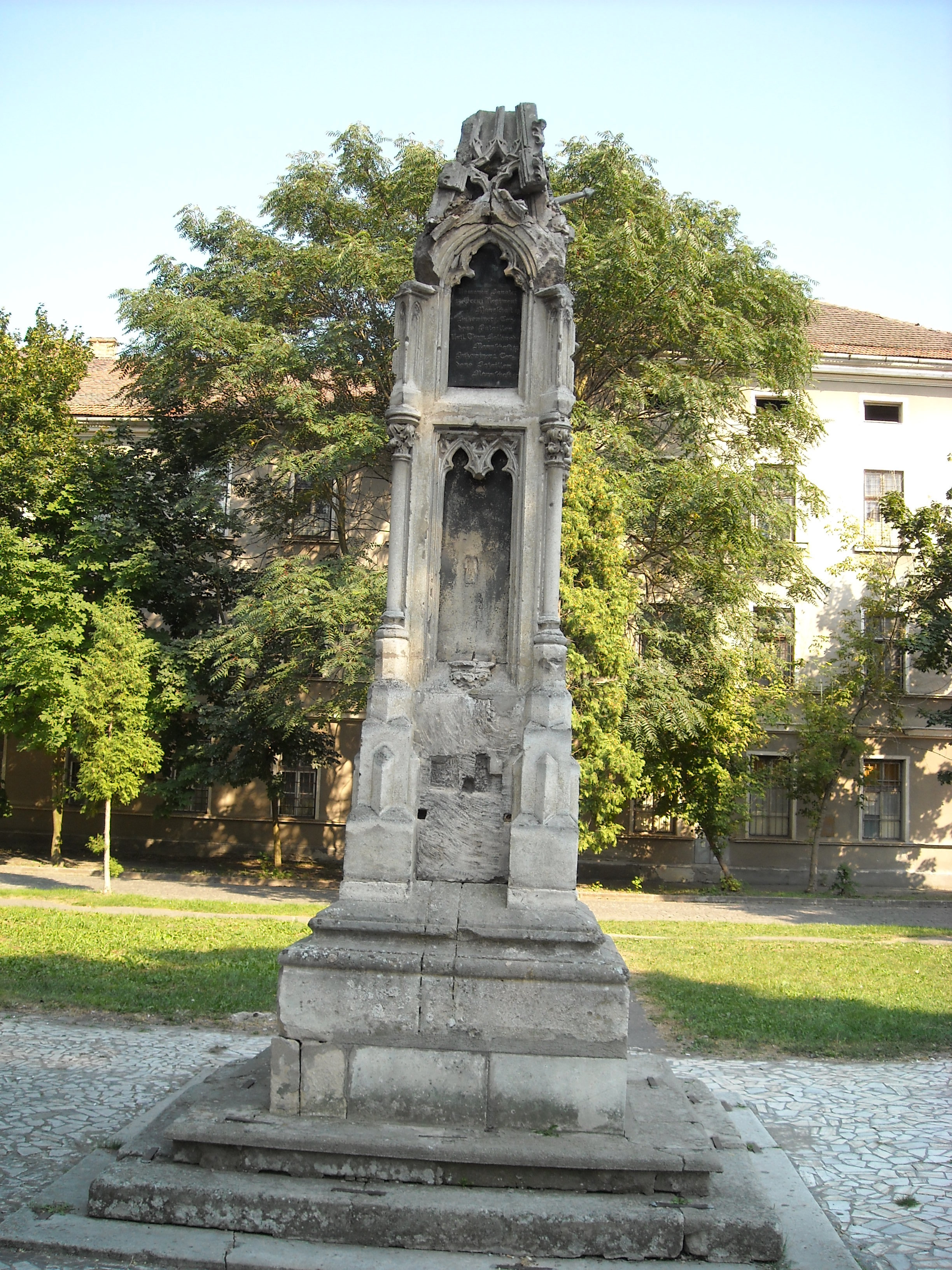
Losenau memorial from Gyulafehérvár/Alba Iulia

The Imperial General Staff itself was also negligent, since if they knew of the reinforcements Bem had received, it is incomprehensible why they did not devote greater forces to the attack.

It should be added that while the imperials deployed in the battle practically all their forces at once, Bem sent his troops into battle gradually. This undoubtedly meant that they were in danger of being defeated in detail, but at the same time, Bem had reserves for the final attack (although the reserves were mainly the most damaged troops of the Transylvanian army, the 4th, 31st and the Volunteer Battalion of Kolozsvár), while Puchner did not.

Despite the fact that Bem's troops were drawn from three different elements: the Transylvanian Army, the Bánság Corps, and the Zaránd Brigade, they cooperated relatively well.

With the victory at Piski, the threat of the Hungarian disaster has been averted. Bem was once again in the lead of the game. And he needed it because in the meantime the Imperial troops had again invaded Northern Transylvania. Puchner, who did not feel beaten after Piski, set up his troops between Alvinc, Alsópián, Szászsebes, and Péterfalva, hoping that Bem would walk into the net thus stretched. Bem, however, outmaneuvered him. On 10 February, he attacked the K.u.K. Stutterheim brigade at Alvinc, forced it to retreat to the fortress of Gyulafehervár, and then marched to Medgyes, bypassing Puchner, to restart, from there, his attacks towards Nagyszeben.

== Legacy ==
In 1853, the Austrian authorities erected a monument in memory of Cavalry Colonel Ludwig von Losenau, who died in the battle of Piski in the castle of Gyulafehérvár. In 1899 the Hunyad County Historical and Archaeological Society decided to erect a monument for the memory of the soldiers from both sides who died in this battle. Unfortunately, this monument was demolished by the newly installed Romanian authorities after the Treaty of Trianon from 1920.

== Sources ==
- Bánlaky, József (2001). A magyar nemzet hadtörténelme ("The Military History of the Hungarian Nation) (in Hungarian). Budapest: Arcanum Adatbázis.
- Bóna, Gábor (1987). Tábornokok és törzstisztek a szabadságharcban 1848–49 ("Generals and Staff Officers in the War of Freedom 1848–1849") (in Hungarian). Budapest: Zrínyi Katonai Kiadó. p. 430. ISBN 963-326-343-3.
- Egyed, Ákos (2010). Erdély 1848–1849 ("Transylvania in 1848-1849") (in Hungarian). Csíkszereda: Pallas-Akadémia Könyvkiadó. p. 616. ISBN 978-973-665-312-4.
- Gracza György A dicsőség napjai ("The Days of Glory"). Az 1848-49-iki magyar szabadságharcz története. IV. kötet, Budapest 1894
- Hermann, Róbert (2001), 1848-1849 a szabadságharc hadtörténete ("Military History of 1848-1849") (in Hungarian), Budapest: Korona, ISBN 963-9376-21-3
- Hermann, Róbert (2004). Az 1848–1849-es szabadságharc nagy csatái ("Great battles of the Hungarian Revolution of 1848-1849") (in Hungarian). Budapest: Zrínyi. p. 408. ISBN 963-327-367-6.
- Horváth, Gábor (2015), "A piski csata ("The Battle of Piski")", győriszalon.hu 09.02.2023 (in Hungarian)
- Szentkatolnai Bakk Endre Az 1848-49-iki szabadságharcz alatti események Vizaknán ("The Events of the 1848-49 War of Independence at Vízakna"). Budapest, 1880
- Tarján, Tamás, "Bem József győzelmet arat Piskinél ("Józef Bem Wins a Victory at Piski")", rubicon.hu (in Hungarian)
