= Battle of Vízakna =

Coordinates: 45°52′31.7″N 24°03′27.6″E

- Part of the Hungarian Revolution of 1848
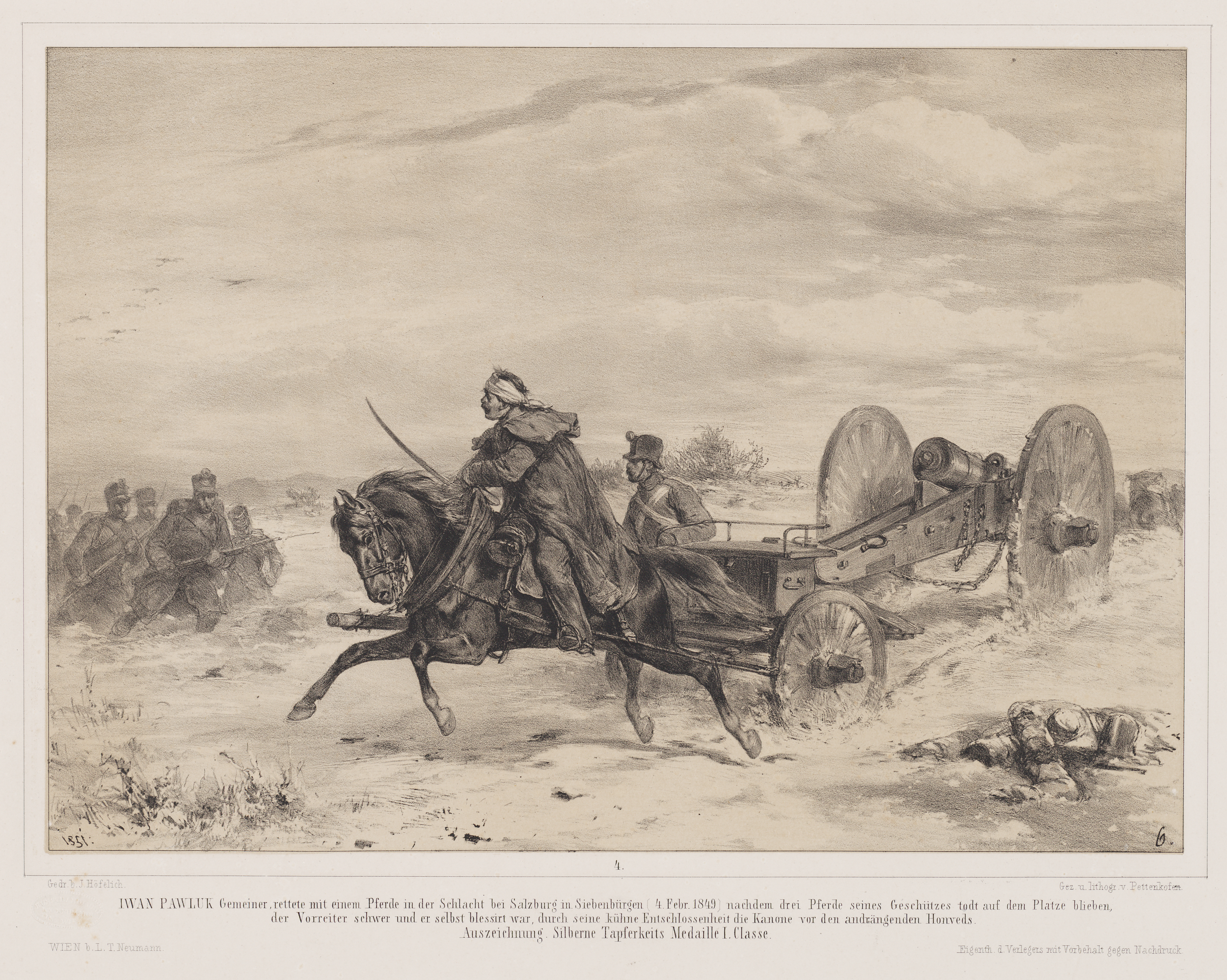
- Battle of Vízakna by August von Pettenkofen
Date	4 February 1849
Location	Vízakna, Alsó-Fehér County, Transylvania, Kingdom of Hungary, (now Ocna Sibiului, Romania)
Result	Austrian victory

Belligerents
Hungarian Revolutionary Army	Austrian Empire: Transylvanian Romanians; Transylvanian Saxons

Commanders and leaders
Józef Bem (WIA)	Anton Puchner

Strength
2,305; 24 cannons	8,139; 30 cannons several thousand Romanian and Saxon insurgents

Casualties and losses
Total: 701; 569 dead 132 wounded 220 captured soldiers killed 15 cannons 9 ammunition wagons supply train	Total: 232; 92 dead, 140 wounded

The Battle of Vízakna was a battle in the Hungarian war of Independence of 1848-1849 fought on 4 February 1849 between the Hungarian army led by the Polish General Józef Bem and the Austrian army of the Habsburg Commander-in-Chief of Transylvania, Lieutenant General Anton Puchner. The Hungarian national poet Sándor Petőfi participated in the battle in the Hungarian army, then wrote a poem entitled Négy nap dörgött az ágyú (Four days the cannons roared...) in which he described the battle. The Austrian forces, who had a significant numerical superiority, were victorious, almost entirely destroying the Hungarian army. Unfortunately after the battle many Hungarian soldiers who could not retreat with the troops, or remained wounded on the battlefield, were killed by the Austrians and their Romanian militia allies, as an act of war crime. With this defeat, all of Bem's previously gained achievements were put in jeopardy, but Bem's skillful operations in the following weeks turned the struggle for Transylvania back in his favour.

== Background ==
After the Hungarian armies were driven out of Transylvania in October–November 1848, an important turning point in the Hungarian War of Independence was the appointment of the Polish Józef Bem as a general of the Hungarian army of Transylvania, as he launched an unexpected attack against the Austrian and Romanian troops advancing towards the Hungarian Plain, trying to attack from the east Hungary, which was attacked at the same time by the Austrian main army of Field Marshal Alfred I, Prince of Windisch-Grätz from the West, Lieutenant General Franz Schlik from the North and the Serbian insurgents from the South in December 1848.

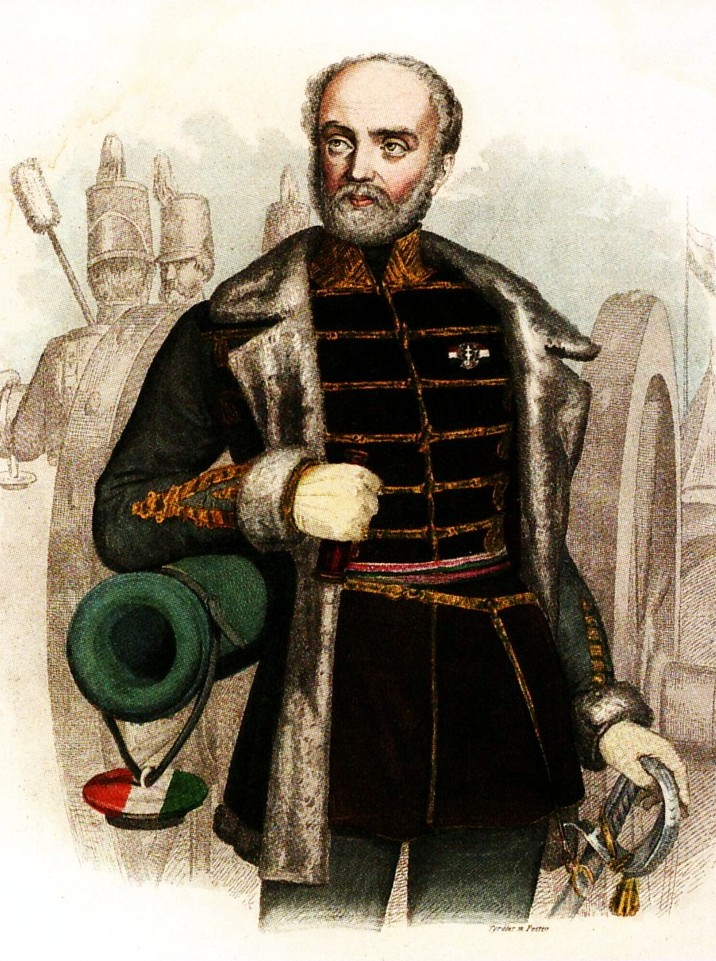
Józef Bem

With his characteristic steadfastness and speed, Bem cut the imperial front in two on 23 December near Dés, first driving Colonel Karl von Urban's border guard regiments into Bukovina and then turning south to win a decisive victory over Lieutenant General Anton Puchner, the main commander of the Austrian armies from Transylvania. In January 1849, the Honvéd Army liberated Székely Land, and then defeated Puchner, who was in an increasingly desperate situation, near Szőkefalva. The imperial commander-in-chief was forced back to his headquarters in Nagyszeben, but Bem tried unsuccessfully to take the city on 21 January in the First Battle of Nagyszeben. This was Bem's first defeat in Transylvania. After his victory at Nagyszeben, Puchner launched an attack, but Bem defeated him in the Battle of Szelindek on 24 January, and forced him to retreat back to where he came from. After this successful battle, Bem sent Major Farkas Kemény with the 11th and 55th Battalions, 1 company of the Mátyás Hussars and a six-pounder battery to Déva via Vízakna-Szerdahely-Szászsebes and Szászváros, to wait there for the relief troops sent from Hungary then return in quick marches, or to wait at Déva for Bem along the Transylvanian-Hungarian border in the case if he was forced to retreat by Puchner.

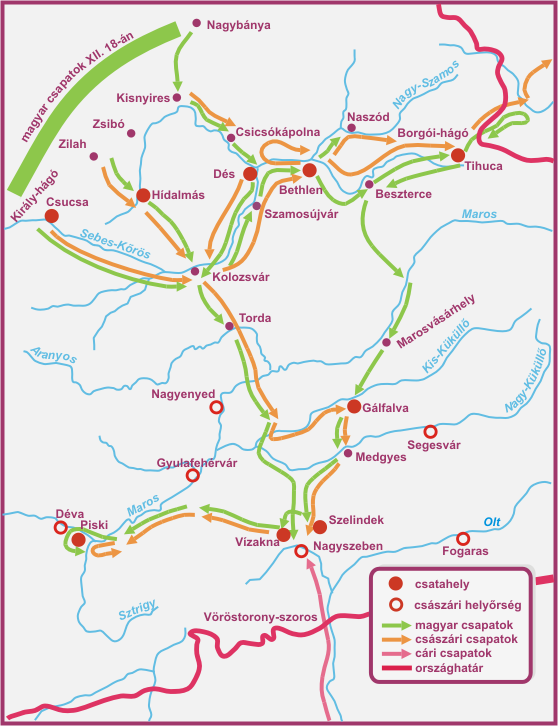
The Hungarian army's campaign in Transylvania between 19 December 1848 - 9 February 1849

Bem retreated from the vicinity of Nagyszeben to Vízakna with Kemény, the latter continuing his way with his detachment towards Déva. After the defeat at Szelindek, Puchner no longer had confidence that he could deliver a decisive blow to Bem with the forces at his disposal, and so, since the Austrian Minister of War could not send reinforcements, he looked in another direction to obtain relief troops. Nicholas I of Russia, had already sent a corps to Moldavia and Wallachia in 1848 under the command of General Alexander von Lüders to contain the revolutionary movements there, which, in view of the events in Transylvania and Hungary, was left in the said provinces for the duration of the Hungarian War of Independence. Puchner intended to use the intervention of this foreign force, but to make things look less compromising for the Habsburg empire, the letter of invitation was written not in his name, as a general of the Austrian army, but on behalf of the Transylvanian Saxons and Romanians. Lüders, however, only offered to intervene on behalf of his government on condition that the commander of the Habsburg troops formally requested it, which Puchner did by decision of the council of war he had convened. The Russians, of course, were happy to help - in fact, Nicholas I (r. 1825–1855) first wanted to send an intervention army of 20,000 troops to Transylvania - but to avoid international complications, the Tsarist forces only invaded Brassó and Nagyszeben. As a result, on February 2, 3 and 4, Russian General Nikolai Engelhardt marched to Brassó with 2,680 infantry, 430 Uhlans, 190 Cossacks and 8 guns; and on February 4, Colonel Grigory Skariatin entered Nagyszeben with 1,960 infantry, 120 Cossacks and 6 guns.

== Prelude ==
As soon as the Russian troops were certain to enter Transylvania, Puchner decided to attack Bem with all the imperial troops at his disposal, and to this end, he assembled his forces in the night of February 3 to 4 in the suburbs of Nagyszeben, from where he began the advance at dawn. To carry the attack through, Puchner's corps was grouped as follows:

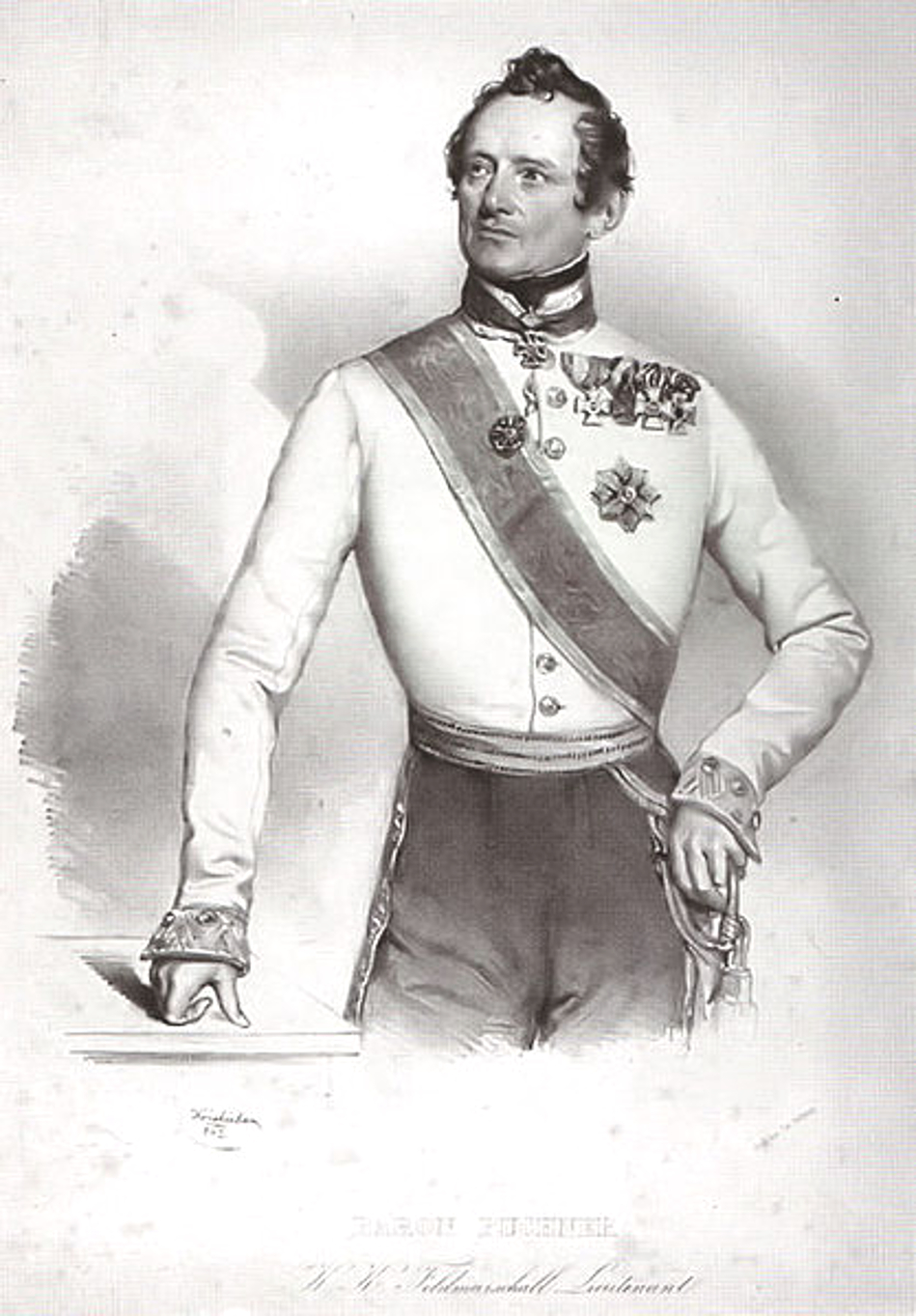
Puchner Antal

- Right wing brigade:
Leader: Major Karl Riebel

- 1 infantry battalion;
- 2 platoons of dragoons;
- 1/2 three-pounder battery.

Total: 800 infantry, 40 cavalry, and 3 cannons.

- Center brigade:
Leader: Colonel Baron Johann Nepomuk Franz Joseph Karl Leopold Freiherr von Stutterheim

- 3rd Battalion of the Sivkovich Infantry Regiment;
- 1st Landwehr battalion of the Sivkovich Infantry Regiment;
- 1st battalion of the Bianchi Infantry Regiment;
- 3rd Battalion of the Charles Ferdinand Infantry Regiment;
- 1 Székely-Hussar company;
- a six-pounder infantry battery;
- 1/2 three-pounder infantry battery.

Total: 2,223 infantry, 86 cavalry, and 15 cannons.

- Left wing brigade:
Leader: General Joseph Freiherr von Kalliány

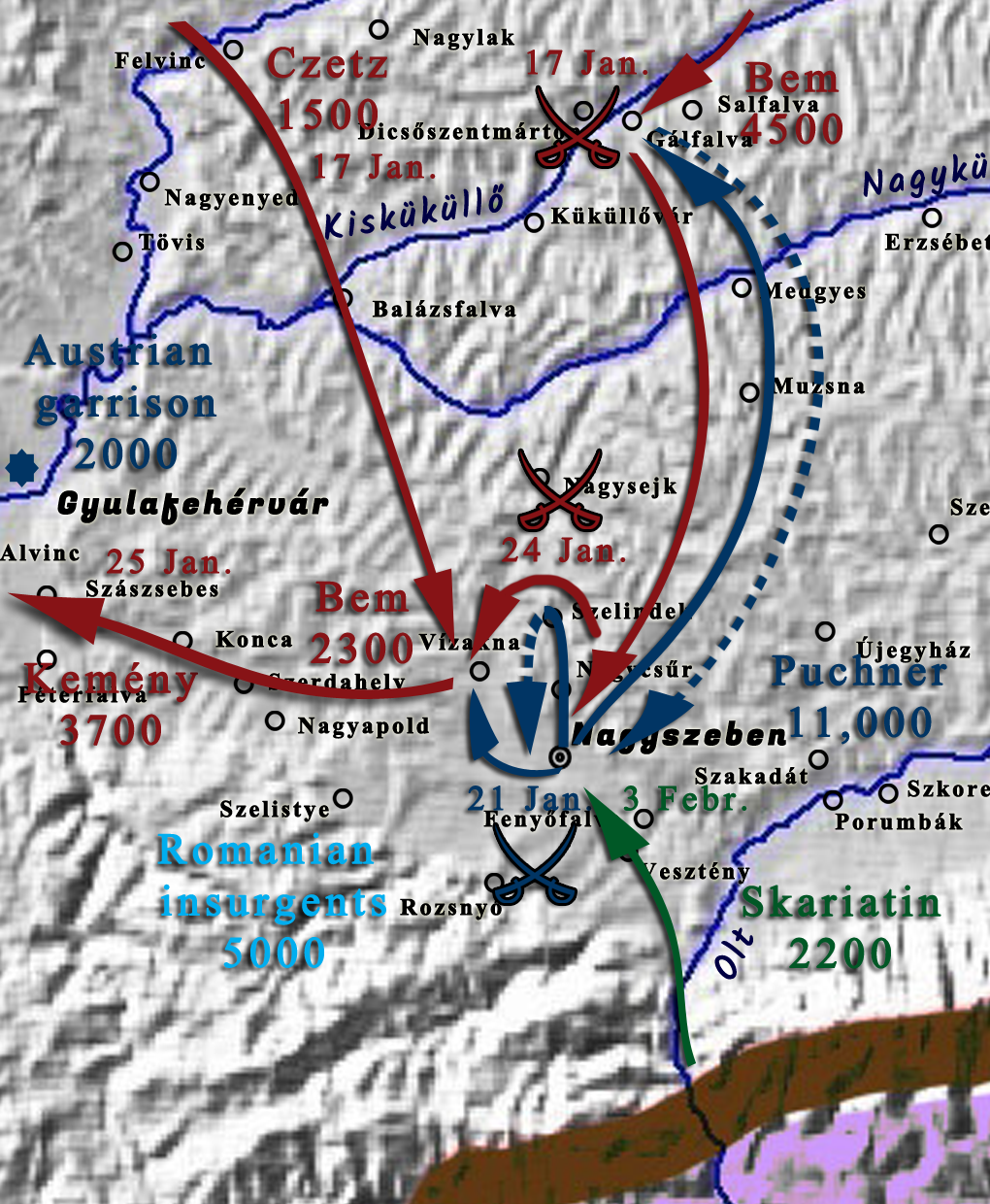
Bem's and Puchner's fights around Nagyszeben until the battle of Vízakna

- 2 companies of the Saxon Kaiserjäger Battalion;
- Combined Battalion of the Charles Ferdinand Regiment;
- 1st Battalion of the Bianchi Regiment; (Note: as this battalion appears also among the battalions of the Center, it could be an error in the source)
- 1st Battalion of the 1st Romanian Border Guard Regiment;
- 1 squadron of chevau-légers;
- 1 three-pounder 1/2 battery;

Total: 1895 infantry, 72 cavalry, and 3 cannons.

- Cavalry brigade:
Leader: Colonel Ludwig Losy von Losenau

- 6 cuirassier companies;
- a three-pounder 1/2 battery.

Total: 424 cavalry, and 3 cannons.

- Reserve brigade:
Leader: General Johann von Coppet

- 3d Battalion of the Parma Infantry Regiment;
- 3d Battalion of the Leiningen Infantry Regiment;
- 3d Battalion of the Tursky Infantry Regiment;
- Urraca Grenadier Battalion;
- 1 squadron of dragoons;
- 1 twelve-pounder cannons battery.

Total: 2,439 infantry, 160 cavalry, and 6 cannons.

Corps total: 7,357 infantry, 782 horsemen, and 30 cannons, not counting the thousands of Romanian and Saxon militias.

Karl Riebel's right wing column had been sent forward in the early hours of the morning of 4 February on the old road to Torda, from which it was to turn off towards the north-eastern exit of Vízakna, sending out patrols towards Szelindek. The remainder of the corps did not depart until 6 a.m. The Center column of Stutterheim advanced on the Nagyenyed road, took position to fight in the center and with Riebel's column secured the connection with the 3rd battalion of the Sivkovich regiment. The left wing column of Kalliány advanced on the main road on the same line with the Stutterheim brigade, while the reserve column of Coppet followed by the Kalliány Brigade. Losenau's cavalry brigade was advancing on the back road west of the main road, was posted behind the left flank during the battle, to be used later as a separate cavalry brigade if required. Finally, a very considerable number of Romanian insurgents (probably several thousand), in order to secure the left flank of the corps, occupied the abatis between Orlát and Sibiel in the upper Cibin valley. A source, probable including also the number of the Romanian insurgents, shows Puchner's army as being 12,000 combatants and 42 (45) guns.

Bem, after he unnecessarily sent away Kemény's brigade, had only 3 battalions, the same number of cavalry companies and 4 batteries left, and their number was according to János Czetz, as it follows:

- 4th Honvéd battalion: 800 men;
- Kemény's battalion: 600 men;
- 4 companies of the 31st Honvéd battalion: 500 men;
- Vienna legion: 30 men;
- a squadron of Matthias Hussars: 200 horsemen;
- a company of Wilhelm Hussars: 100 horsemen;
- a division of the Kress Cuirassiers: 75 horsemen;
- 24 cannons.

In total: 1,930 infantry, 375 horsemen and 24 guns.

With this handful of troops, Bem intended to hold out against Puchner until the reinforcements arrived at Vízakna, where his troops built strong entrenchments. For a while Bem hoped that troops would arrive from Székely land to reinforce his troops, but the brigade from the Csíkszék and Háromszék seats which departed to help Bem, encountered a detachment of Russian troops which were sent from Brassó, which forced the leader of the Székely land army, Colonel Sándor Gál, to order his troops back, fearing that the unprotected Háromszék would be attacked by Russian and Austrian troops.

So Bem's small army, who was waiting for the Székelys in vain, built their positions in the abandoned salt mines around Vízakna.

== Battle ==
At about 8 (9) o'clock in the morning the imperial columns arrived at the Vízakna Plateau in front of Bem's advance line. The approaching of the Austrian troops were first observed by the soldiers of Major Kálmán Csutak, who reported this to Bem, at which the latter deployed his troops in battle formation as follows: on the left flank, under Major Zsurmay, 2 companies of the 4th Honvéd battalion, 1 company of the Vilmos-Hussars, 1 company of the Kress-cuirassiers and 4 guns; on the right flank, under Major Gergely Bethlen, the 31st Honvéd Battalion, one company of the Matthias Hussars and 4 cannons. The remainder of the army, i.e. Kemény's battalion, 4 companies of the 4-th Honvéd Battalion, the Vienna Legion and some guns, under Bem's personal command, took up their positions in the center.

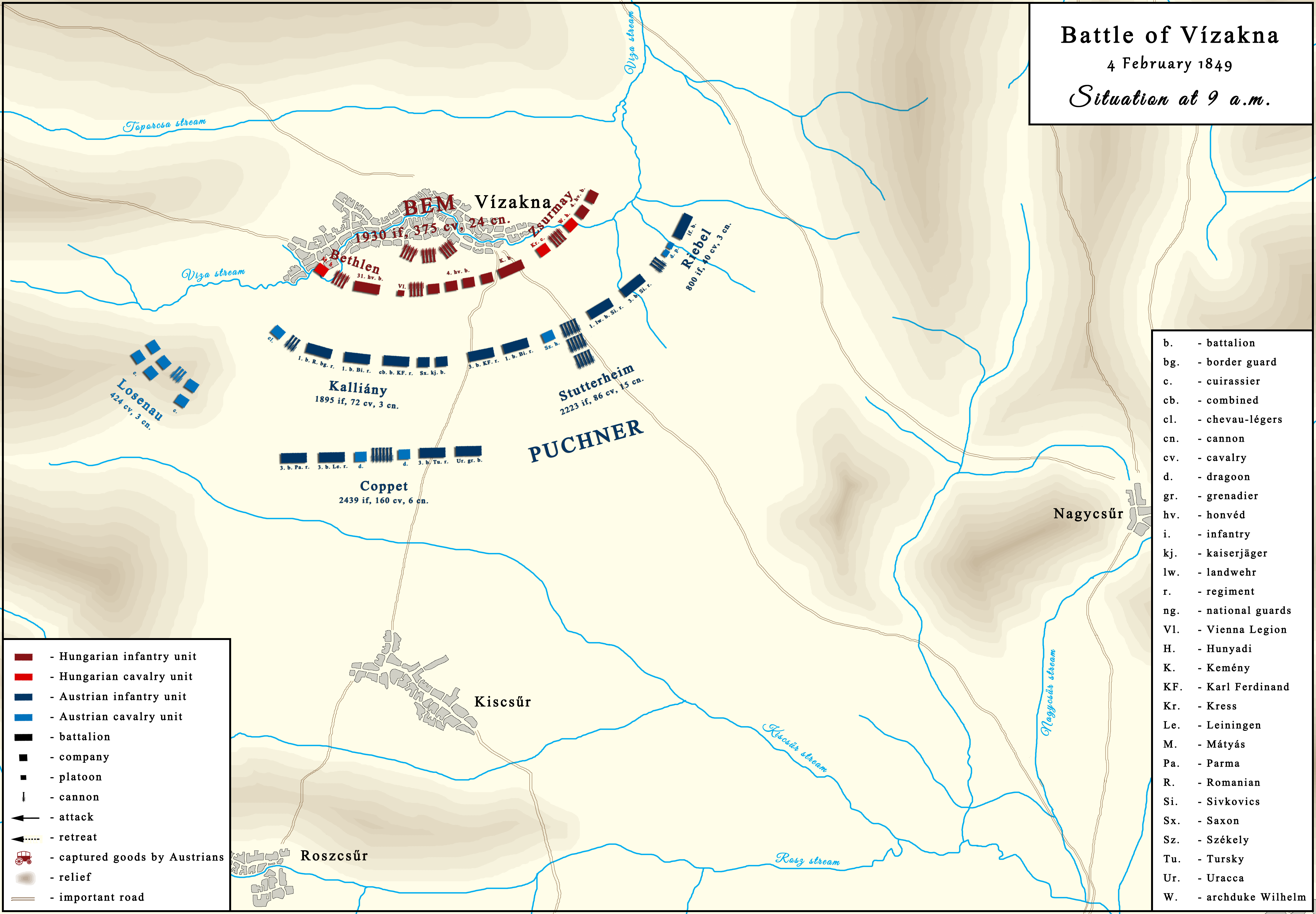
Battle of Vízakna - 4 February 1849. Situation at 9 a.m

The Austrians massed their battalions behind their skirmish lines, in a huge front line, while Bem organised his small army into a single skirmish line, to prevent the enemy from encircling, leaving only a platoon at the banners of every unit, as reserves. Bem's troops waited until the enemy arrived within range of the guns and rifles, then wreaked havoc on the masses of the enemy battalions, while the Austrian guns found it harder to hit the Hungarian infantry moving in a thin line, which forced the enemy line to retreat with a bayonet charge. At first, Puchner didn't believed that Bem's army was so small, thinking that most of the Hungarian army was at Vízakna, and fearing a trick, did not launch a decisive attack. Meanwhile, according to the recollection of Hussar Sándor Imre, Bem, ignoring the enemy's rifle shots and cannon fire, rode forward almost to the battle line and watched the battle. The superior Imperial artillery, at the beginning, tried, but without much success, to destroy the much inferior Hungarian artillery positioned in the Hungarian center, which not only responded effectively to them, but even caused losses to the Austrian guns positioned against the right flank. Bem's guns hit and destroyed 3-4 Austrian ammunition vagons, causing further losses and panic among the enemy. According to the recollections of Hungarian soldiers, the gunmen spotted Puchner among the enemy officers, and told to Bem, that they want to shoot at him, but the Polish general convinced them not to do so, because: in his place, a wiser general will be sent, who will not be so easily dealt with. Meanwhile, the Hungarian national poet Sándor Petőfi, who was then a captain in Bem's army, was riding on the right wing and was encouraging the troops from here, who were fighting valiantly. This fight went on for two hours, during which time Bem's artillery held its own so well that the batteries of the imperial central column began to waver. Seeing this, at 11 a.m., Major Zsurmay, with the 4th Honvéd Battalion and the Kress Cuirassiers, launched a decisive attack against Puchner's right flank column, forcing it to retreat to the heights, leaving behind many dead and wounded, several guns and carts full of ammunition; whose example was soon followed also by Stutterheim's brigade from the Austrian center, which started to retreat as well. Bem, taking advantage of the favourable turn of events, and despite the objections of his officers, abandoned his advantageous position and immediately set off with all his artillery in pursuit of the Imperials, but now Puchner personally intervened, stopped his retreating troops on the hills;e massed all his artillery on the heights; ordering the infantry to a new attack on behind a hill and after a harsh cannonade ordered the Urraca grenadier battalion, which was still in reserve, and the Parma and Tursky battalions to counter-attack, with a bayonet charge against the single line of Hungarian infantry.

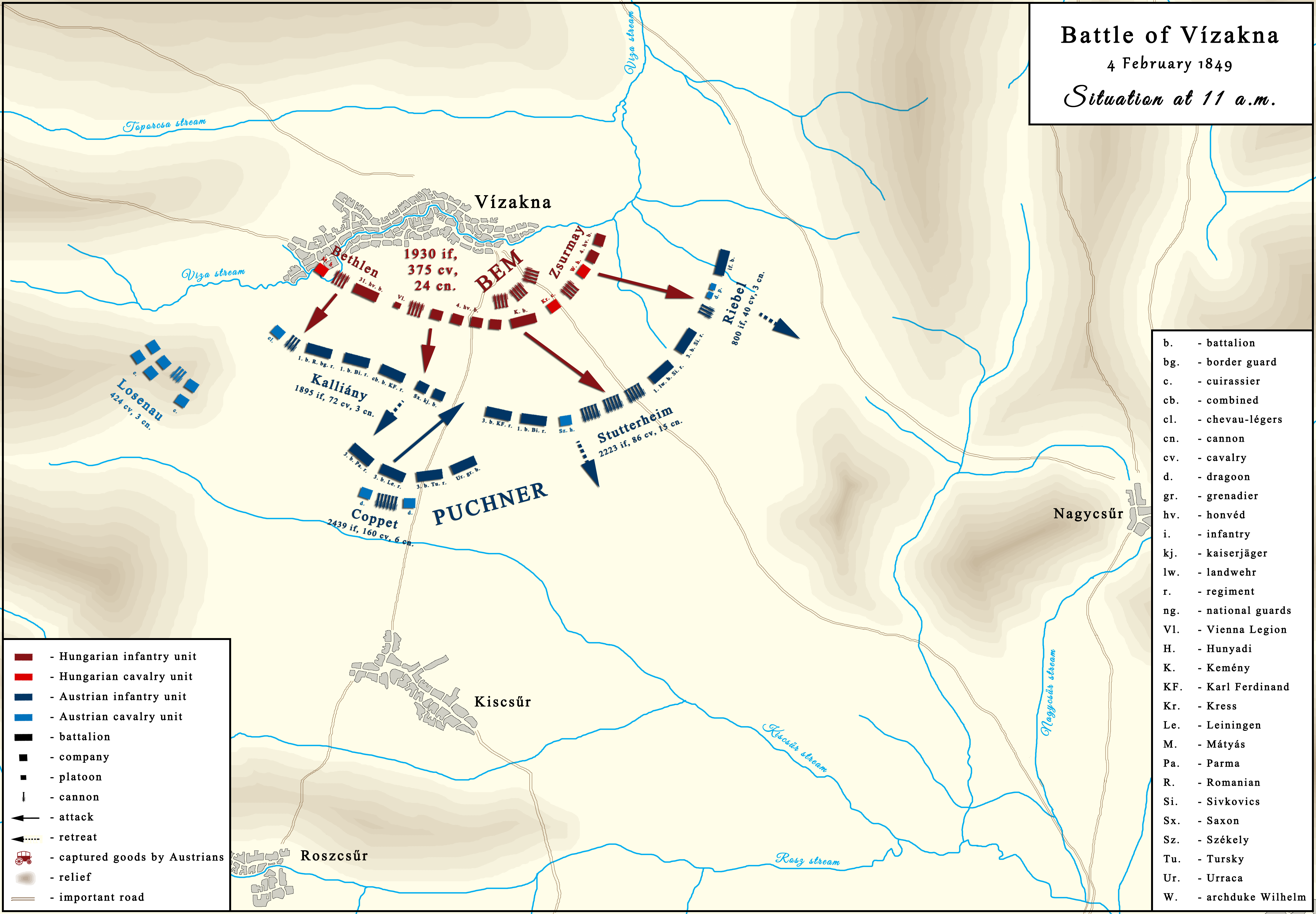
Battle of Vízakna - 4 February 1849. Situation at 11 a.m

At the same time, the Riebel column, reinforced with the Sivkovich battalion, also counterattacked. According to the Transylvanian historian Ákos Egyed, this was a premeditated stratagem by Puchner, who had earlier already arranged his troops in advantageous positions in preparation for the Hungarian counterattack. Despite the huge overwhelming force against him, Bem held his ground for an hour, and although he made the Imperial troops in front of him repeatedly stop, and even retreat from time to time, his handful of troops, which at the order of their commander, leave their defensive positions, now exposed in the open field, began to crumble under the pressure of the huge overwhelming force, and although his right flank remained in position, first the left, then the center's infantry started to run. In spite of the infantry's routing, the commander-in-chief, with his, now unprotected batteries, held his position for some time. At one moment Bem asked one of his soldiers to bring to him an enemy cannonball which hit the ground near him, he observed the ball, and said in French that this was an eight-pounder cannonball, which was not used by the Austrians, but by the Russians, so the enemy is shooting at him with Russian guns. At this moment he finally ordered the general retreat. When the order reached the right wing, which, despite being attacked by overwhelming forces, among them Puchner's almost entire cavalry, until then repelled all the Austrian charges, Petőfi was still ordering the hussars to attack. As a result of this, one part of the right wing was still attacking, while the other started to retreat. Only after everybody understood that Bem's order was to retreat, all the troops from here, fell back.

Puchner's right wing and center, using the advantage gained, attacked together the Hungarian center with such force that it soon retreated to its former position, and then was forced to flee also from there after a short time.

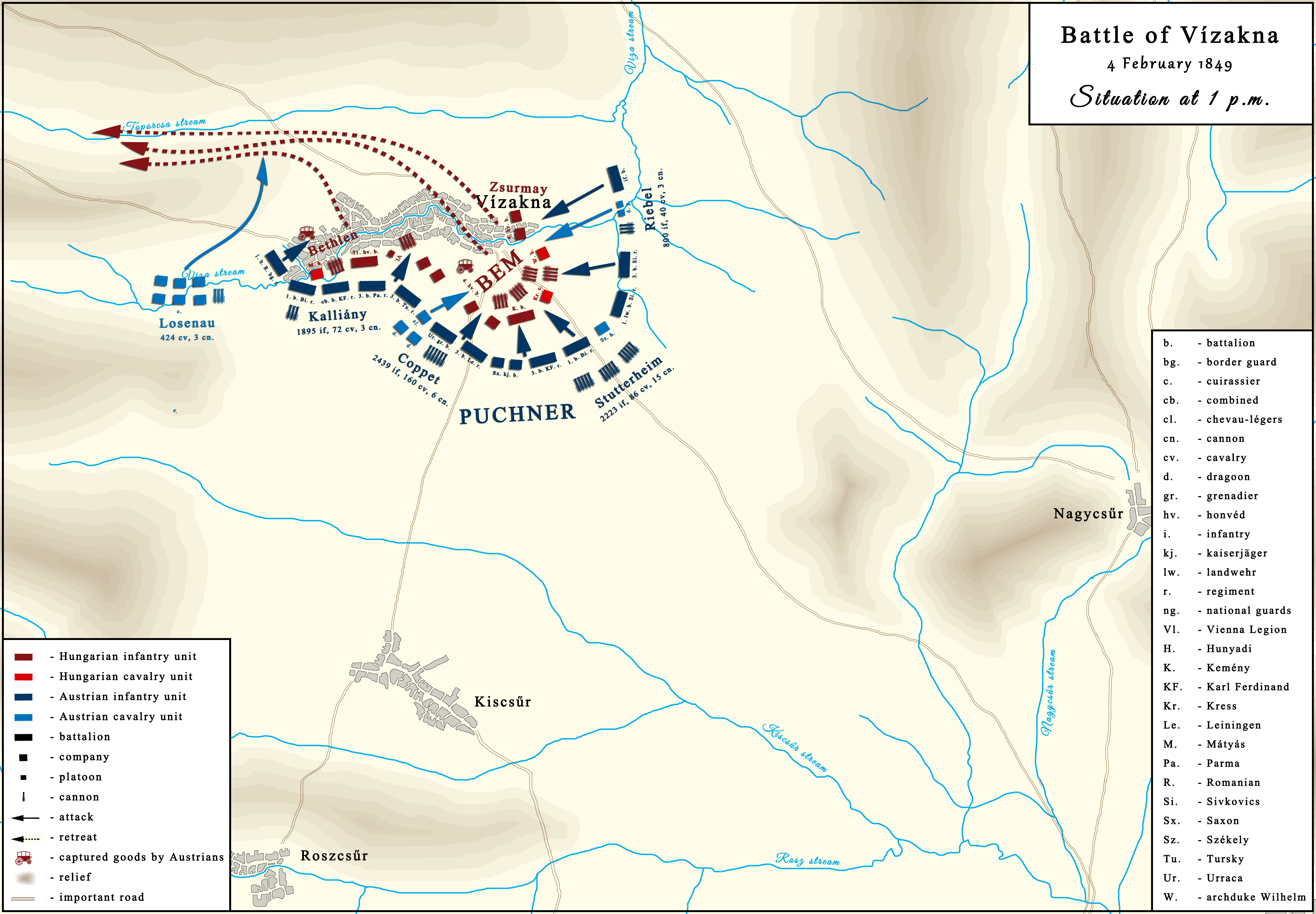
Battle of Vízakna - 4 February 1849. Situation at 1 p.m

An imperial cuirassier unit approached Bem, recognizing him, their officer with some commoners surrounded the commander of the Hungarian army trying to take him prisoner, but Lieutenant Colonel Czetz's aide-de-camp, Major Simon Simonyi, rode there at the decisive moment, shoot two privates with his pistol, and cut the officer's helmet in two, whereupon the Viennese legion formed a circle around Bem, and chased the rest of the cuirassiers away.

At the same time, Puchner's grenadiers rushed down the hill and began to fortify themselves in front of the salt mines, led by the Austrian commander-in-chief Puchner himself. The natural consequence was that Bem's troops were forced to retreat from their original position at the start of the battle.

15 of his guns could no longer be saved, largely due to the fact that, prior to the battle, Bem had given strict orders to his headquarters commander, Major Bayer, in case of retreat, not to send away the troop's carriages until he had received a personal order from him (Bem) to do so. Because of this, the confused and disordered train blocked the exits of Vízakna when the Hungarians tried to retreat, and only a small part of the artillery was able to make its way through. In one of the streets of the town, the escape of the soldiers, stuck because of the piled-up cannons and carts, was made even more difficult by the fact that their rifles had run out of ammunition, so the Hussars who came close to them gave them their own cartridges, which they used to repel the attack of the Austrian grenadiers, giving them time to escape by pulling away the vagons from their way. The completely scattered Hungarian army retreated in a mad dash through Toporcsa-Kisapold towards Szerdahely; the remnants of Zsurmay's left flank retreated through Mundra-Nagyselyk towards Medgyes. The squadron of Colonel Losenau with 9 guns, which tried to pursue the Hungarians were repulsed by Bem's remaining artillerists, who also destroyed the bridges and roads to slow them down. There is no doubt that in the event of a vigorous pursuit, Bem's army would have had hardly any troops left, but fortunately the imperials, because of the heavy snow which made it difficult for the cavalry to quickly advance, did not interfere much with the flight of the broken Hungarian army. About 2 hours after the fighting had ended, Colonel Losenau was ordered to give chase with 2 1/3 battalions, 2 companies of cavalry and 1 1/2 batteries, which column reached Kisapold in the evening without reaching the retreating Hungarians, and because of the extreme cold and the exhaustion of the troops, he gave up further pursuit. On the day of the battle, most of the Austrian army advanced as far as Toporcsa (a village near Vízakna), where they spent the night.

== Aftermath ==
In the battle 349 Hungarians were killed and 132 wounded, and Bem himself was shot in the left hand. 52 horses were also lost.

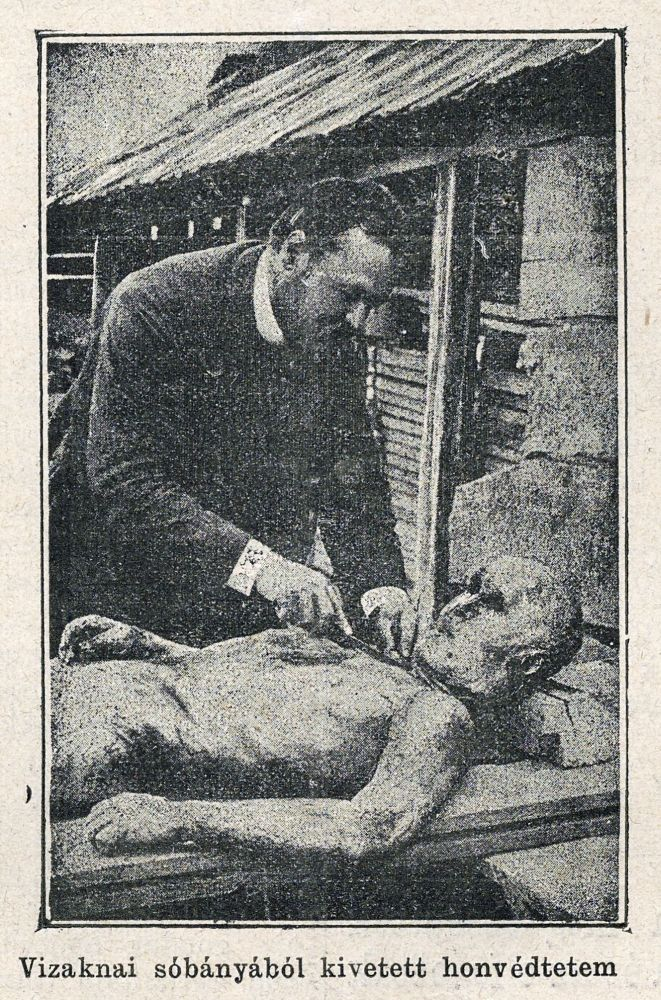
Dr. Henrik König dissecting a honvéd's body preserved in the salt mines of Vízakna. Történelmi Lapok 1894

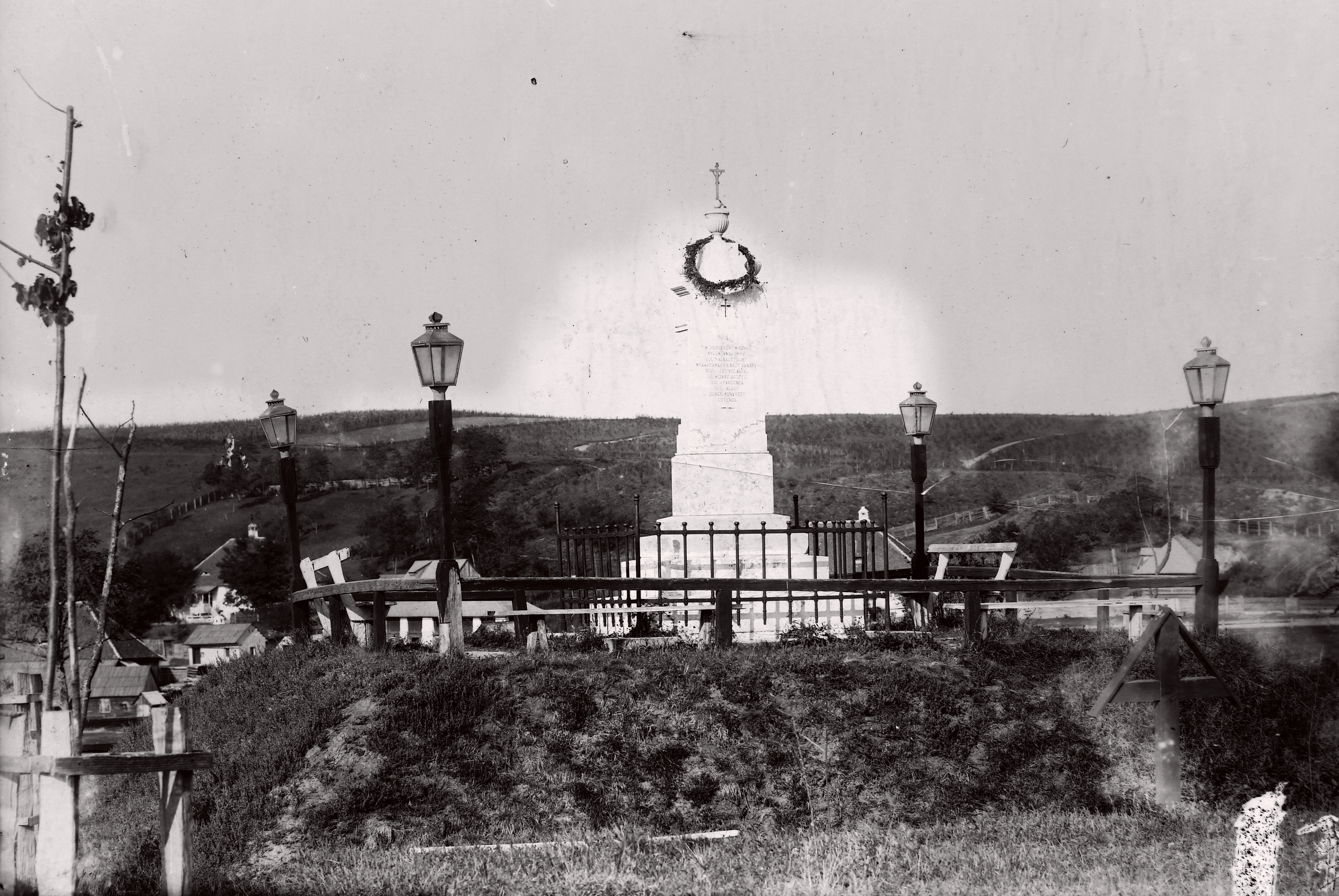
The monument of the victims of the Battle of Vízakna destroyed after 1918

Bem's army was reduced to 1,500 men, badly exhausted by the battle of Vízakna; his guns were down to six (two of which, captured for a short time by the enemy, then recaptured, being nailed by the Austrians, in order to make them unusable), and his ammunition was almost completely exhausted. In addition to the lost 15 guns and 9 ammunition wagons, the enemy also captured almost the entire supply trains and part of the documents of the army's operations bureau, with the treasury. The imperial losses were: 3 officers and 89 soldiers dead, 3 officers and 137 soldiers wounded.

After the battle, both in Vízakna and the following day in Szászsebes, the Austrians and the Romanian troops who fought together with them, massacred the wounded Hungarian soldiers, or those who had survived the battle, and tried to hide in the houses or the salt mines near the town. The majority of the 50 wounded Hungarian soldiers sent from Vízakna to Szászsebes were killed by Saxon insurgents. After the battle, 300 dead and still living wounded soldiers were thrown into the salt mines of Vízakna, from where their bodies, preserved intact by the salt, were removed in 1894. All these killings among the Hungarian soldiers can be considered war crimes. As a result of these atrocities, the number of the Hungarian casualties in Bem's army rose to 569 dead. On 10 August 1896 a marble monument was erected at the salt mine in which the bodies were found, as a homage to the victims of the battle, but in 1920, after the Treaty of Trianon the Romanian authorities newly installed in Transylvania, demolished this monument. Not only the Hungarian soldiers fell victims to the atrocities of the Austrian soldiers and Romanian and Saxon insurgents, but also the Hungarian inhabitants of the city. Puchner allowed 2 hours of free looting for his soldiers among the Hungarians, but the pillaging continued that night too.

The dramatism of the battle of Vízakna was described by the Hungarian poet Sándor Petőfi, who as mentioned above, fought in this bloody battle, in his poem Négy nap dőrgött az ágyú... (Four days the cannons roared...). The poem highlights the heroism of General Bem, praising him with admiration and respect.

After the arrival of Russian help and the defeat at Vízakna, it seemed that Bem, pressed by the Austrian army and the Romanian popular uprising, had no chance of victory. His only option was to try to make his way west and join the reinforcements sent to Transylvania by General János Damjanich, but he still had to fight a bloody rearguard action against the imperialists along the Maros river. Although Bem bore a heavy responsibility for the defeat at Vízakna, in the following weeks he showed his extraordinary qualities as a commander, because, after further bloody battles, by 9 February he had successfully reached Piski, where he won a bloody victory over the Austrians, turning again the course of events in his favor.

== Sources ==
- Bánlaky, József (2001). A magyar nemzet hadtörténelme ("The Military History of the Hungarian Nation) (in Hungarian). Budapest: Arcanum Adatbázis.
- Bóna, Gábor (1987). Tábornokok és törzstisztek a szabadságharcban 1848–49 ("Generals and Staff Officers in the War of Independence 1848–1849") (in Hungarian). Budapest: Zrínyi Katonai Kiadó. p. 430. ISBN 963-326-343-3.
- Egyed, Ákos (2010). Erdély 1848–1849 ("Transylvania in 1848-1849") (in Hungarian). Csíkszereda: Pallas-Akadémia Könyvkiadó. p. 616. ISBN 978-973-665-312-4.
- Imreh, Sándor, "A vízaknai csata 1849. február 4-én és Petőfi Sándor ("The Battle of Vízakna and Sándor Petőfi")", Együttműködés Isaszegért Egyesület (in Hungarian)
- Kozłowsky, Eligiusz (1958). General Józef Bem. Warsaw: Hungarian Ministry of Defence. pp. 543–549.
- Petőfi, Sándor, "Négy nap dőrgött az ágyú ("Four Days the Cannons Thundered")", Verstár - ötven költő összes verse (in Hungarian)
- Szentkatolnai Bakk Endre Az 1848-49-iki szabadságharcz alatti események Vizaknán ("The Events of the 1848-49 War of Independence at Vízakna"). Budapest, 1880
- Tarján, Tamás, "Bem vereséget szenved Vízakna mellett ("Bem is Defeated at Vízakna")", Rubicon Online (in Hungarian)
