= Winter Campaign (1848–1849) =

Military campaigns of the Hungarian War of Independence

- Part of the Hungarian War of Independence of 1848–1849
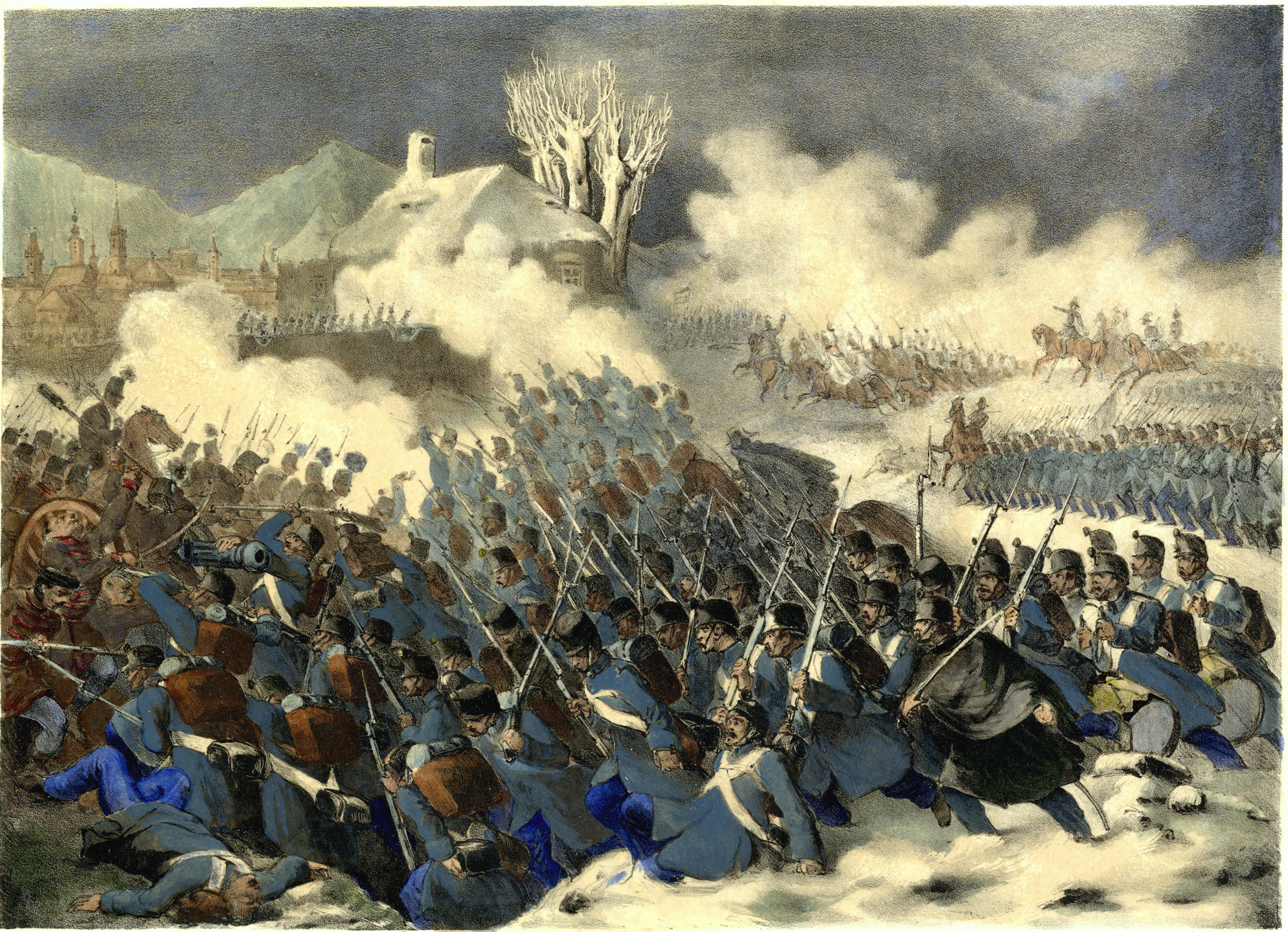
- Battle of Nagyszeben 21 January 1849
Date	2 December 1848 – 2 March 1849
Location	Kingdom of Hungary and Principality of Transylvania (1711–1867)
Result	Partial Austrian victory

Belligerents
Austrian Empire: Kingdom of Croatia; Serbian Vojvodina; Serb rebels; Pro-Habsburg Hungarians; Slovak National Council; Transylvanian Romanians; Transylvanian Saxons; Supreme Ruthenian Council; Czech and Moravian volunteers; Russian Empire	Kingdom of Hungary: Legions of the revolutionaries from German states; Polish legions; Italian legions; Székelys; Hungarian Jews; Hungarian Germans; Hungarian Slovenes; Pro-Hungarian Slovaks; Pro-Hungarian Romanians; Pro-Hungarian Serbs; Pro-Hungarian Rusyns; Zipser Saxons; Croats from Western Hungary and Muraköz; Šokac and Bunjevac people; Banat Bulgarians

Commanders and leaders
(Austrian Empire) Franz Joseph I; (Austrian Empire) Alfred I of Windisch-Grätz; (Austrian Empire) Franz Schlik; (Austrian Empire) Anton Puchner; (Austrian Empire) Josip Jelačić; (Austrian Empire) Stevan Knićanin; (Austrian Empire) Avram Iancu; (Russian Empire) Grigory Skariatin	(Kingdom of Hungary (1526–1867)) Lajos Kossuth; (Kingdom of Hungary (1526–1867)) Artúr Görgei; (Kingdom of Hungary (1526–1867)) György Klapka; (Kingdom of Hungary (1526–1867)) János Damjanich; (Kingdom of Hungary (1526–1867)) Lajos Aulich; (Kingdom of Hungary (1526–1867)) Mór Perczel; (Kingdom of Hungary (1526–1867)) Sándor Gál; (Poland) Józef Bem

Strength
(Austrian Empire) 150,350 soldiers & 350 guns; (Russian Empire) 7,000 soldiers & 14 guns; 100,000 men	100,000 soldiers & 300 guns

The Winter Campaign refers to the series of campaigns of the Austrian imperial army led by Field Marshal Alfred I, Prince of Windisch-Grätz in the winter of 1848 against the Kingdom of Hungary during the Hungarian War of Independence of 1848–1849. As a result of this, the imperial troops occupied much of Hungary, but the Hungarian resistance did not cease; but managed to stop Windisch-Grätz's advance on the line of the Tisza River and at the same time, capture much of Transylvania.

== Background ==
Until the end of summer 1848, the Habsburgs reluctantly accepted the Batthyány government and the national achievements of the March 15 revolution in Pest. Their goal was to end Hungarian autonomy by portending friendliness toward the Hungarian government until were crushed the rebellions within the empire and the Italian unification movements. By the end of the summer, however, these issues had been resolved. King Ferdinand V refused to sign the Hungarian legislation, forcing the Batthyány government to resign. He also supported the Croatian army, led by Lieutenant General Josip Jelačić, in its attack on Hungary on September 11. Restoring full Habsburg rule over Hungary via accommodation was abandoned when Count Franz Philipp von Lamberg, a loyalist dispatched with the task of taking command of the Hungarian army, was on October 28 lynched by a crowd in Pest. Meanwhile, the Hungarian army, led by János Móga, stopped the Croatian attack at the Battle of Pákozd on September 29. On October 6, the Vienna Uprising broke out, and Jelačić left Hungary with his troops to help restore their the emperor's power. For this reason, the Croatian troops stranded in Transdanubia surrendered to the Hungarians (the Surrender at Ozora).

After the Batthyány government resigned, the National Defense Committee, led by Kossuth, took over in Hungary. Together with the Hungarian parliament, they continued the resistance and organized the Hungarian army. Kossuth urged the Hungarian army to pursue Jelačić to Vienna and support the revolution in Vienna against the imperial army, which was led by Alfred I of Windisch-Grätz. However, several officers who had sworn allegiance to both the emperor and the Hungarian constitution opposed this plan, so the army remained on the Austrian border for nearly a month. Finally, Kossuth appeared in the Hungarian camp to force an attack, which he achieved with the support of Colonel Artúr Görgei. However, the Hungarian troops advancing toward Vienna were defeated by the Austrian army led by Jelačić in the Battle of Schwechat. The next day, Windisch-Grätz forced Vienna to surrender.

On October 3, the emperor issued a manifesto ordering the imperial troops and their officers stationed in Hungary to renounce their allegiance to the Hungarian government. This incited an open rebellion. Most of the foreign officers did so and left the Hungarian army. Some joined Jelačić's advancing armies in September, while others began to revolt. The commanders of the Arad and Temesvár forts declared that they recognized only the emperor's authority. Lieutenant General Anton Puchner, commander of the Transylvanian army, also revolted. He led his troops, supported by Romanian and Saxon rebels, and drove the Hungarian troops out of Transylvania by the end of November. Here, the Székely people of Háromszék were the only ones who decided to remain loyal to the Hungarian government.

== Change of ruler ==
The accession of a new monarch preceded the attack of the main imperial army against Hungary. Emperor Ferdinand's unfitness for the throne (Ferdinand I. as Emperor of Austria and Ferdinand V. as King of Hungary) had long been evident, and the "military party" (those who were supporting a military solution for the conflict between Austria and Hungary) led by Prince Windisch-Grätz had already begun preparing for a change of throne in early September 1848. After the suppression of the Viennese Revolution of 6 October and the formation of a new government on 21 November by Prince Felix of Schwarzenberg, who advocated a united Austria, Ferdinand's resignation was only a matter of weeks away. One reason for the change of throne was that Ferdinand had sworn an oath to the Hungarian constitution, and therefore could no longer order the attack of the main Austrian army against Hungary to occupy it and end its constitutional order, and another was that the Emperor had repeatedly shown himself unfit to rule.

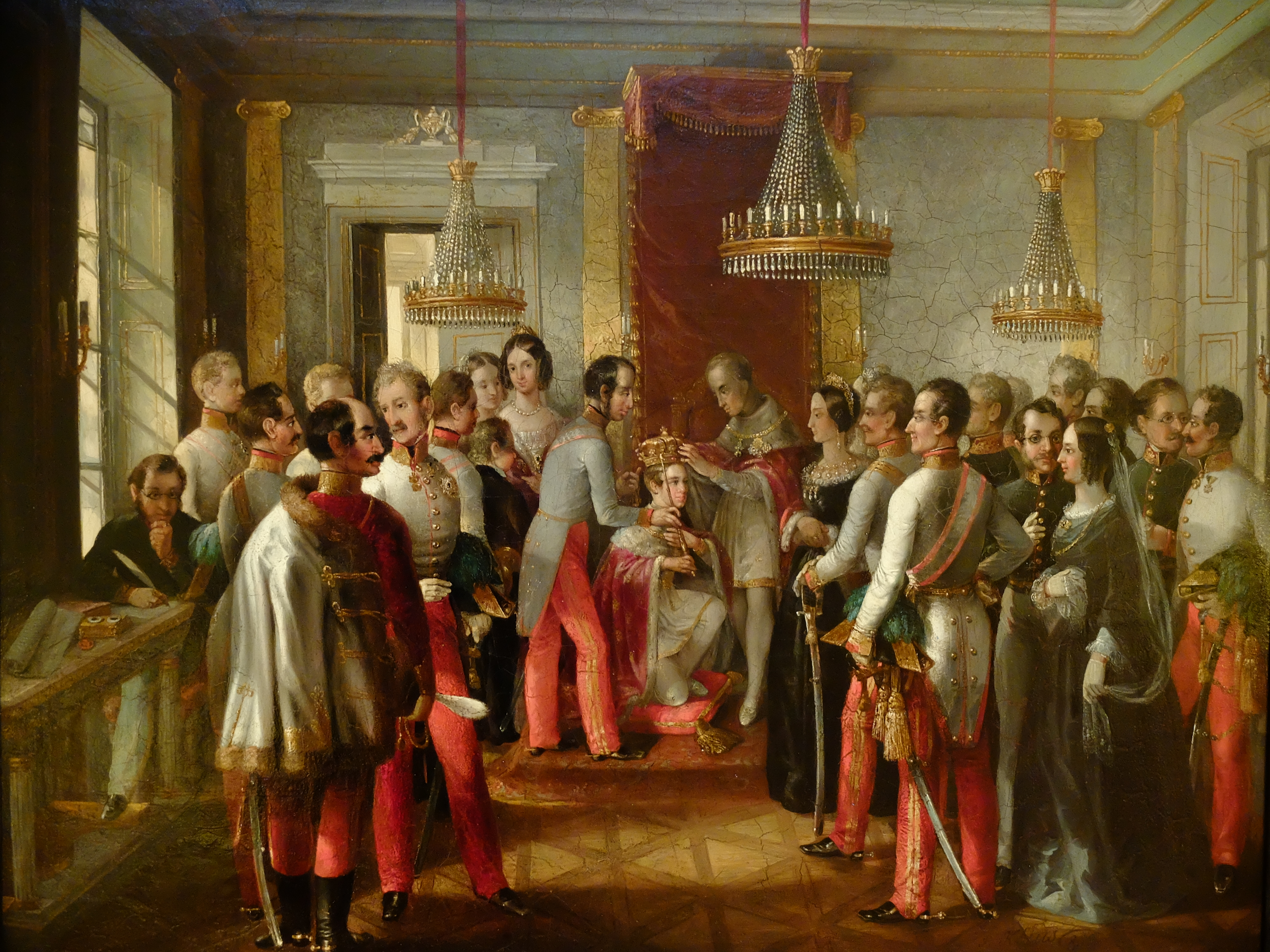
Ferdinand the 1st (Ferdinand the 5th of Hungary) gives the imperial crown to Franz Joseph and resigns on 2 December 1848. by Josef Klaus

On 2 December, as a result of the intervention of the imperial court and the military party, which advocated for an authoritarian centralization, he abdicated the throne and was succeeded by his nephew, Franz Joseph I, by skipping the order of succession. Since the new emperor did not swear an oath to Hungarian law, his supporters believed he had greater freedom of action to abolish Hungarian constitutionalism.

The news about the change of the throne arrived in Pest on 5 December. Kossuth briefly declared it a farce of abdication, and the parliamentary declaration he had proposed stated: The royal throne of Hungary cannot be vacated without the prior consent of the nation, [and] by the common law of mankind, only the death of the crowned king can make it empty. Until this happens, no one may unilaterally decide the possession of the Hungarian royal seat. Only those who swear an oath of allegiance to the laws and are legitimately crowned are considered kings of Hungary. Anything else is considered a usurpation of the throne.

The Parliament's resolution therefore rejected the change of throne and continued to regard Ferdinand V as King of Hungary. However, it did not rule out the later recognition of Franz Joseph I, if he was willing to respect the constitutional rules and traditions of the coronation and duties of the Hungarian kings. However, Franz Joseph did not feel compelled to obey Hungarian law, as he had not crowned himself Hungarian king.

== Opposing forces ==
=== The K.u.K. army and its allies ===
The Austrian army was under the command of Field Marshal Windisch-Grätz and had the following troops at his disposal. The main grouping was in the Vienna area, consisting of the 1st (Jelačić) Corps, the II (Wrbna) Corps, and the reserve Serbelloni Corps, with 45,000 men and 216 guns in total.

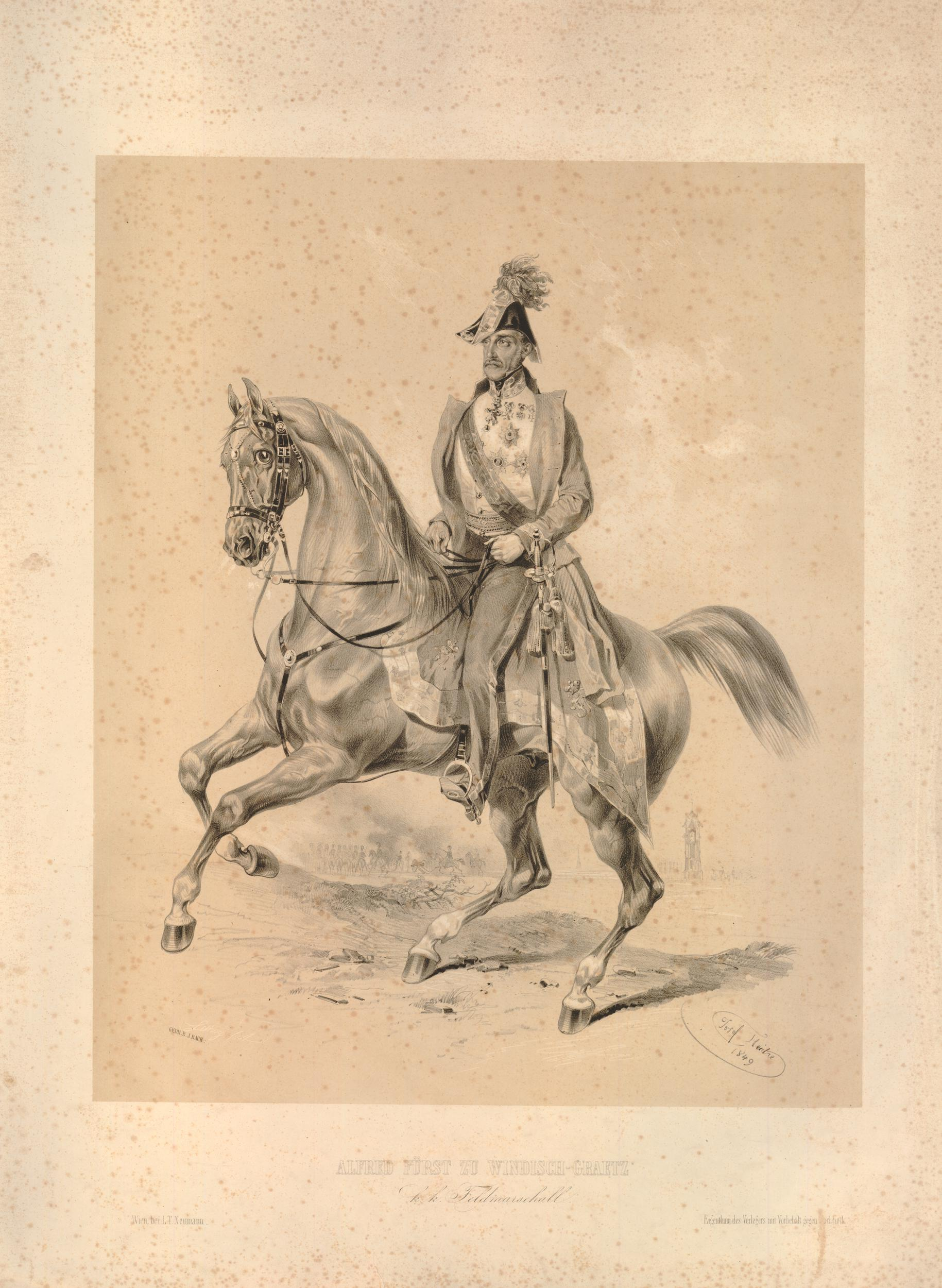
Alfred furst zu Windisch-Graetz

Other troops were waiting for the order of attack in Moravia, where Lieutenant-General Balthasar Simunich's division of 4,500 men and 12 guns awaited orders, in Galicia where Franz Schlik’s corps was ready to attack with 8,400 men and 27 guns, in Transylvania where Lieutenant-General Anton Puchner's army of 16-17,000 men with 24 guns wanted to head towards the Tisza, and in Styria where Major-General Laval Nugent von Westmeath was preparing with 6,000 soldiers. In addition to these major troops, there were other columns of troops assigned to various tasks.

The large force of approximately 30,000 Serb insurgents from Bácska and Banat, was ready to chase out the Hungarian troops from there.

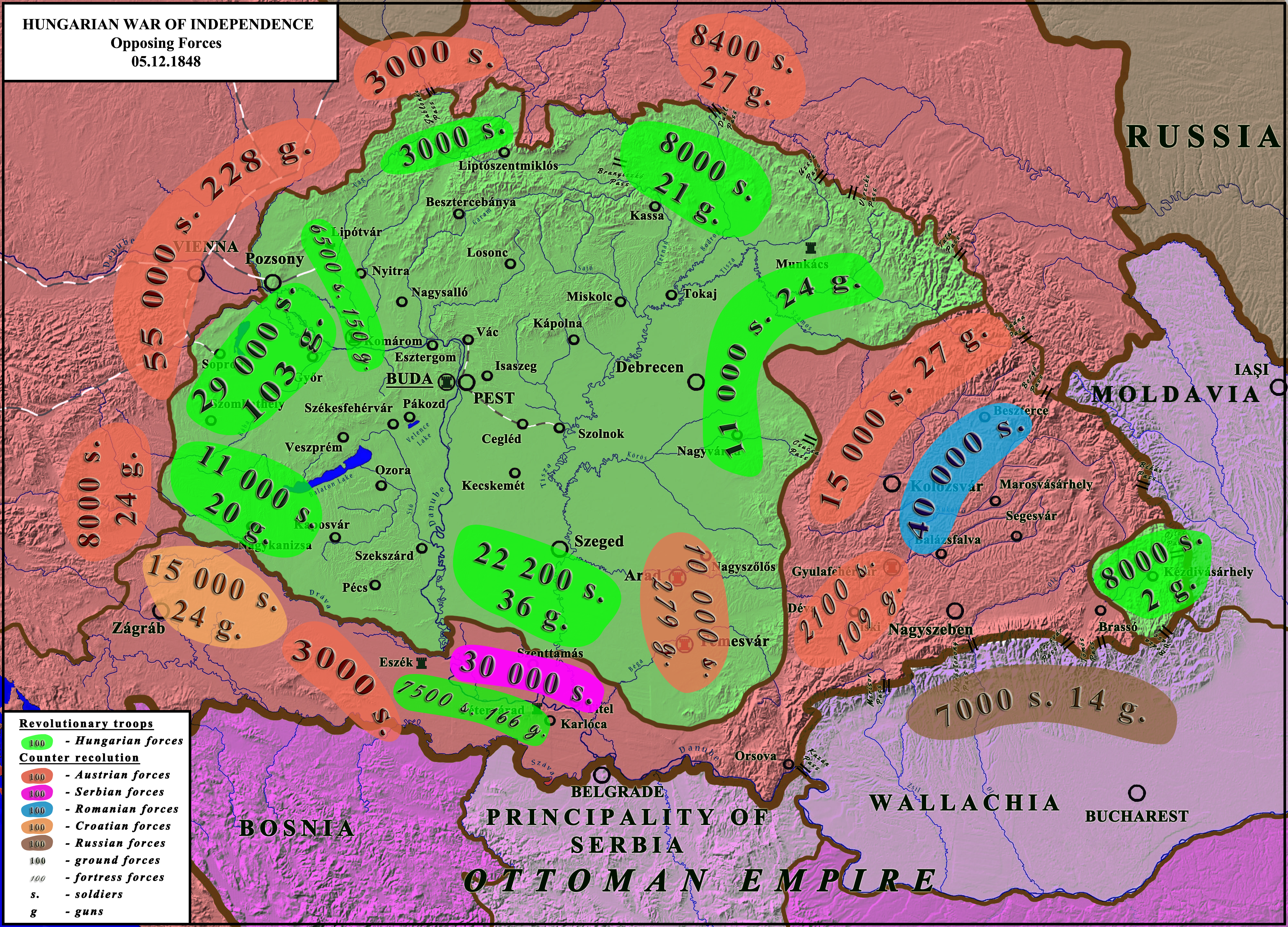
Balance of forces during the Hungarian wars of Independence of 1848-1849 before the start of the Winter Campaign

From the major important castles in the country, Arad, Temesvár, and Gyulafehervár were in Austrian hands. The garrison of Temesvár consisted of 6000 soldiers and 213 cannons. The garrison of Arad consisted of 2000 soldiers and 66 cannons. The garrison of Gyulafehérvár consisted of 1557 soldiers with 50 heavy and 50 field guns.

The total size of the force was close to 150,000 with about 350 guns.

Romanian, Saxon, and Slovak irregular forces were also part of this. The total number of Transylvanian Romanian and Saxon national guards and militias was probably around 100 000. The number of Slovaks fighting the Hungarians was low. The Slovak legion, formed of Czech-Moravian volunteers and Slovaks, numbered only around 200 at the beginning of December, but by February this had increased to 1,800.

The aim of the campaign was the capture of the Hungarian capitals, Pest and Buda, the main direction of the attack being Vienna-Győr-Komárom-Buda. The imperial troops waiting for the order from the west, north, east and south, had to attack the center of the country at the same time.

=== The Hungarian army ===
After Móga's resignation, the main grouping of the Hungarian troops was led by General Artur Görgei, who had 23,000 men and 103 guns at his disposal in the area around Bratislava. A group of 3,000 National Guardsmen mobilized near the Moravian border. At Kassa, Lieutenant Colonel Sándor Pulszky commanded 9,000 men and 21 cannons. At the Csucsa Pass, Major János Czetz with about 10 000 men, and 21 cannons. In Bácska and in Banat there were 24 000 soldiers and 36 cannons. Around Arad 6000 Hungarian soldiers and 13 cannons were camped. In Muraköz, under the command of General Mór Perczel there were 9000 men, and 20 guns.

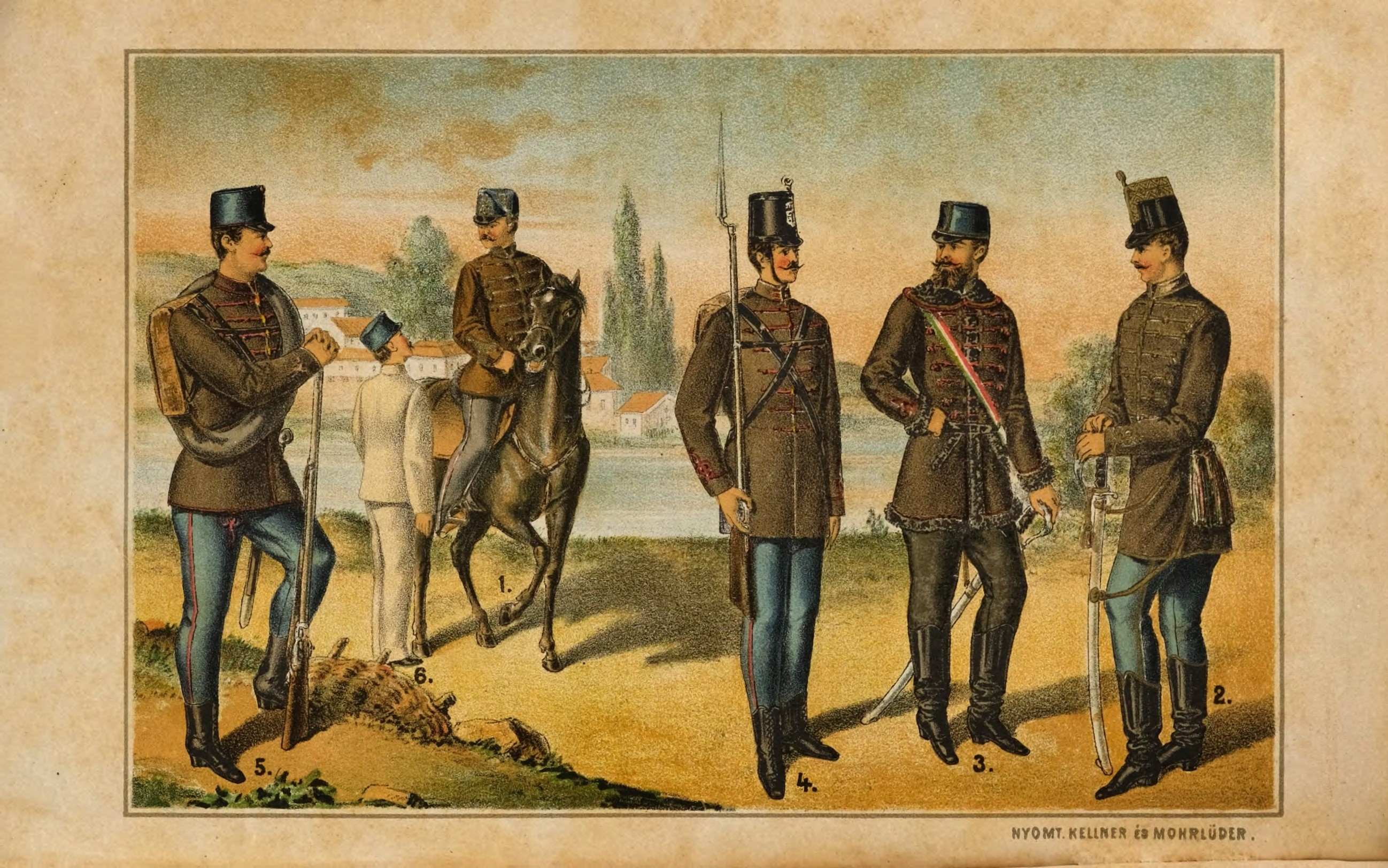
1. infantry in summer clothes 2. infantry in marching uniform 3. infantry in parade clothes 4. officer in winter marching clothes 5. ordinary officer in parade clothes 6. staff office in off duty clothes

Indirectly, the Hungarian leadership could count on the support of the Székelys from the Seat of Háromszék. The number of armed men involved in the Székely resistance in Háromszék was around 10 000, and by the end of December, the number of their home-made cannons was 9.

The most important fortresses in Hungarian hands were Komárom, Pétervárad, Lipótvár and Eszék. Komárom had 3,000 defenders, 6 field, and about 120 fortress guns. The guard of the Pétervárad Castle consisted of 3500 soldiers, 6 field guns, and 100 fortress cannons. At Eszék there were 4,400 soldiers and 60 fortress cannons. And the castle of Lipótvár was defended by 1,000 soldiers and 24 cannons.

The total number of the Hungarian army, without the national guards and the troops in formation was 100,000 soldiers and 300 cannons.

The goal of the Hungarian troops was to prevent the enemy from crossing the border and to preserve the political autonomy of the country starting from March 1848. There was no joint commander-in-chief to coordinate the troops' activities, and the commanders were given political guidance at most. Thus there was no central command.

== Imperial campaign ==
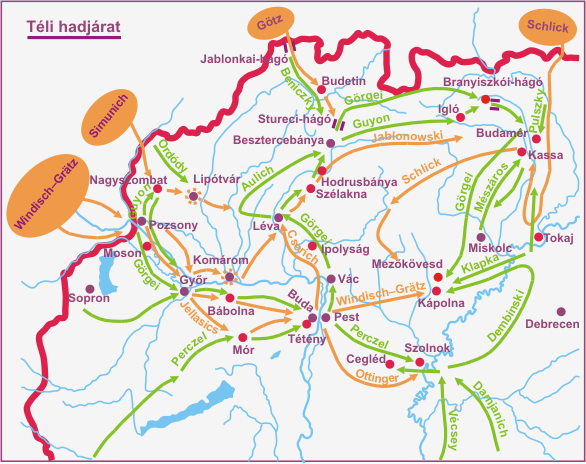
The Habsburg Winter campaign against the Hungarian revolutionary government in 1848-49

=== Schlik campaign in Upper Hungary ===
Rumors about an enemy invasion had been coming in steadily since November 1848. After all proved to be fake news, the Hungarian political and military leadership started hoping that the attack of the imperial army would be canceled since a winter campaign can also cause serious problems also for the attackers. Despite these hopes, the attack did take place

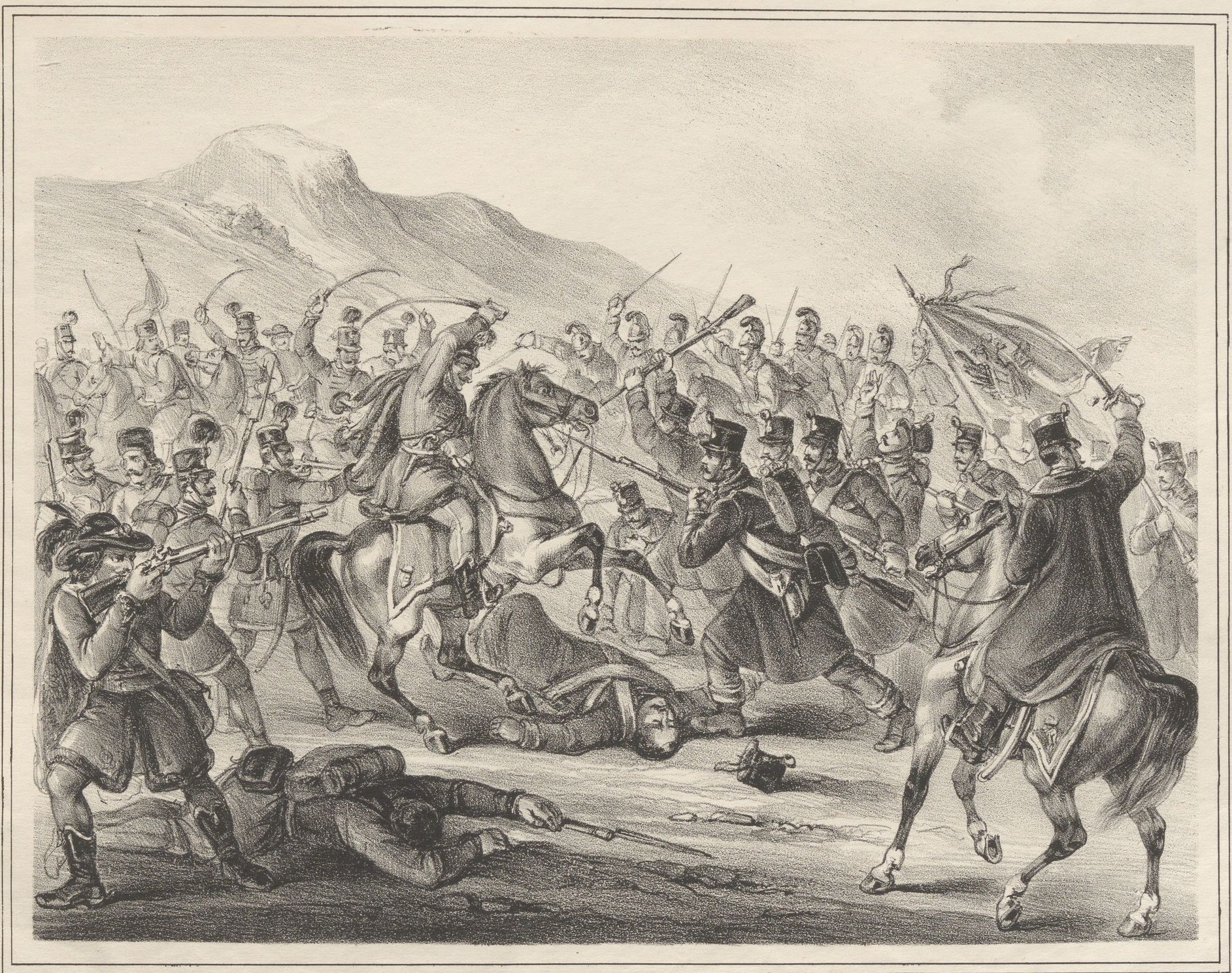
Battle of Kassa. 04.01.1849 Karl Lanzedelli

At the beginning of December, the attack of the K.u.K. troops began. Lieutenant General Franz Schlik, who had invaded Upper Hungary from Galicia, captured Eperjes and Kassa, and on 11 December he dispersed the newly assembled army of Colonel Sándor Pulszky in the Battle of Budamér. At the end of the month, the Minister of War himself, General Lázár Mészáros, rushed against Schlik, but his attack in the Battle of Kassa on 4 January 1849 also ended in a disastrous failure. After the defeat, the Hungarian troops retreated south as far as Miskolc.

=== The attack of the main imperial army ===
==== Advance on the capitals ====
In mid-December, the attack also began on the main battlefront. On 14 December, Lieutenant-General Simunich's troops broke into the Nádas Pass, and on 16 December, they defeated Colonel Richard Guyon's troops in the Battle of Nagyszombat.

On the same day, the imperial army led by Field Marshal Windisch-Grätz launched an attack along the Lajta River’s front and almost swept away Görgei's Army of the Upper Danube. Görgei tried to hold off the enemy's main forces at Győr, but in the harsh winter, the rivers and marshes around the city froze so hard that the enemy could cross them even with its cannons.Hermann 2009, pp. 63–64 This compromised Görgei's plans centered on the defense of Győr because he understood that the enemy could easily encircle him, so at the last moment, he withdrew his troops from the city's entrenchments and marched with them toward Buda.

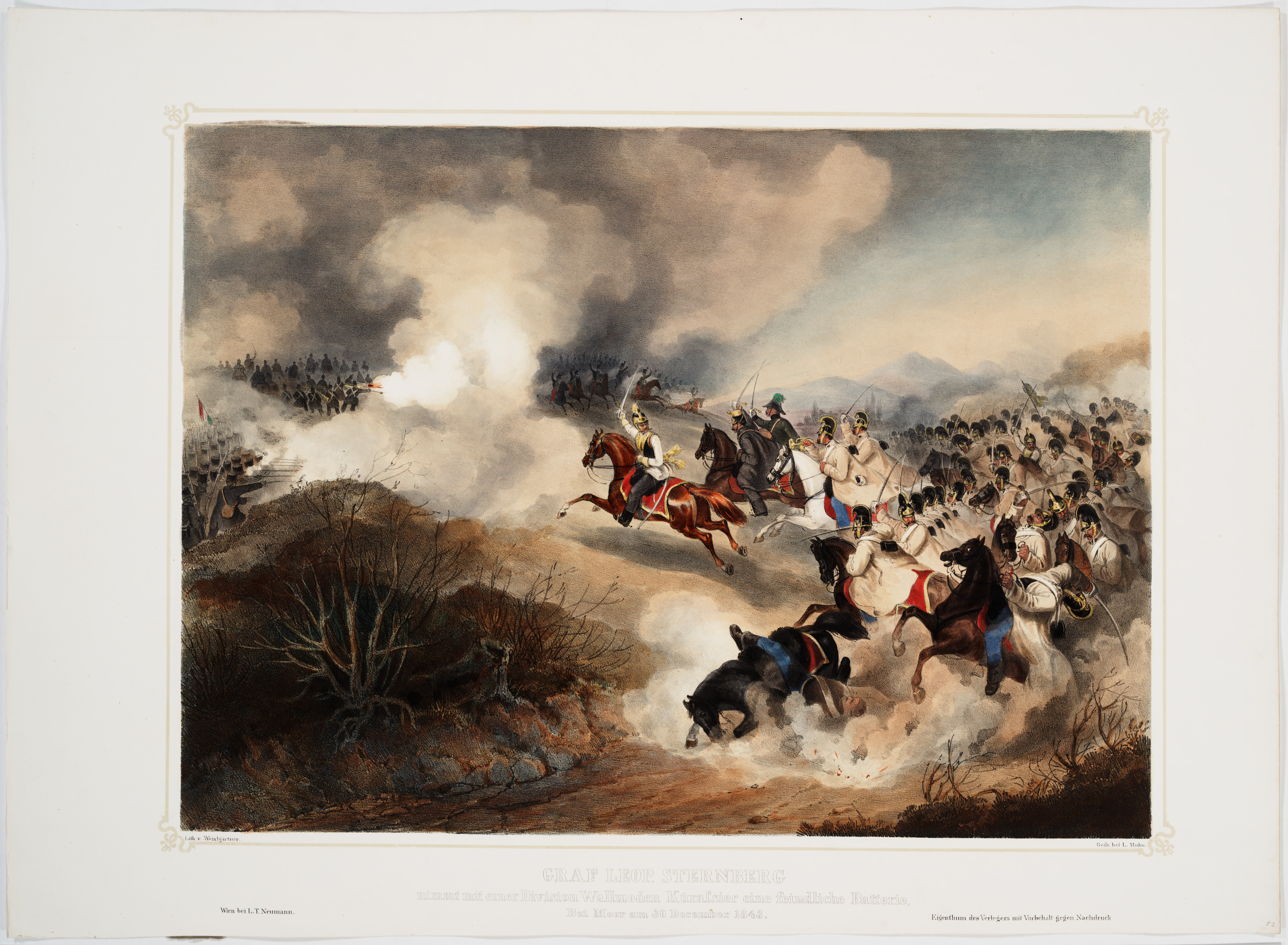
Battle of Mór. Leopold Sternberg attacking with the Wallmoden Cuirassiers a Hungarian battery

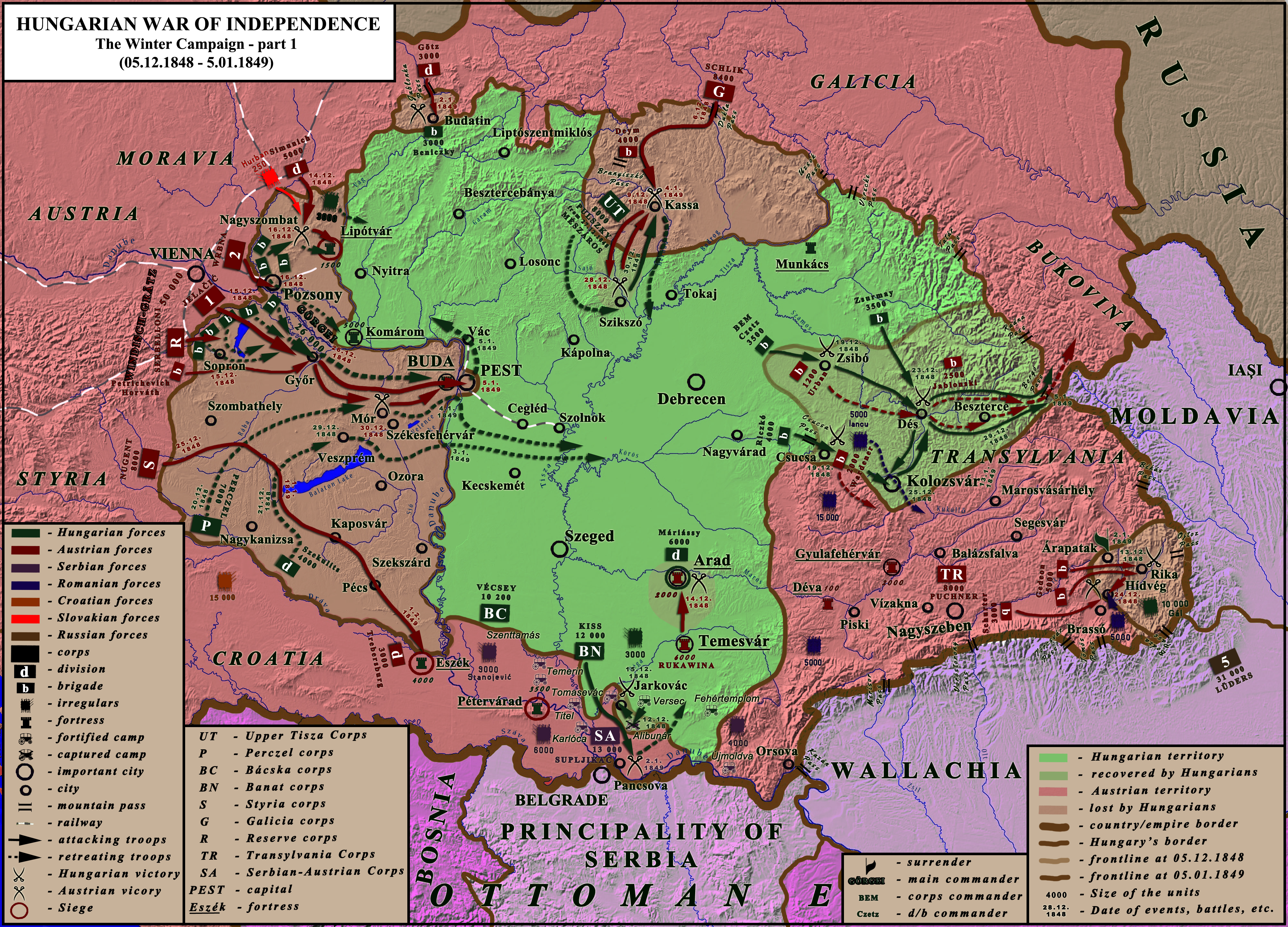
The Military Situation in Hungary between 05.12.1848-05.01.1849

Kossuth hoped to stop the imperial army at least in front of the capital. Therefore, he ordered reinforcements from southwestern Hungary to the capital, calling from there General Mór Perczel, and asking him to unite with Görgei's troops. But before the unification of the two Hungarian armies took place, on 30 December Perczel met with Jelačić's corps in the Battle of Mór, and suffered a serious defeat, a third of his troops remaining on the battlefield or being captured.

After the defeat of Mór, there was no longer any hope of stopping the enemy before the capital. Thus, on 31 December, the National Assembly and the National Defence Commission decided to flee to Debrecen, where they installed themselves, proclaiming this town the new provisional capital of the revolutionary Hungary. Before that, they sent a peace delegation to Windisch-Grätz, but the prince demanded unconditional surrender, and after the K.u.K. troops had marched into the capitals, he arrested one of the members of the Hungarian delegation, the former prime minister Lajos Batthyány, who remained under their arrest until his execution on 6 October.

==== The military council from 2 January 1849 ====
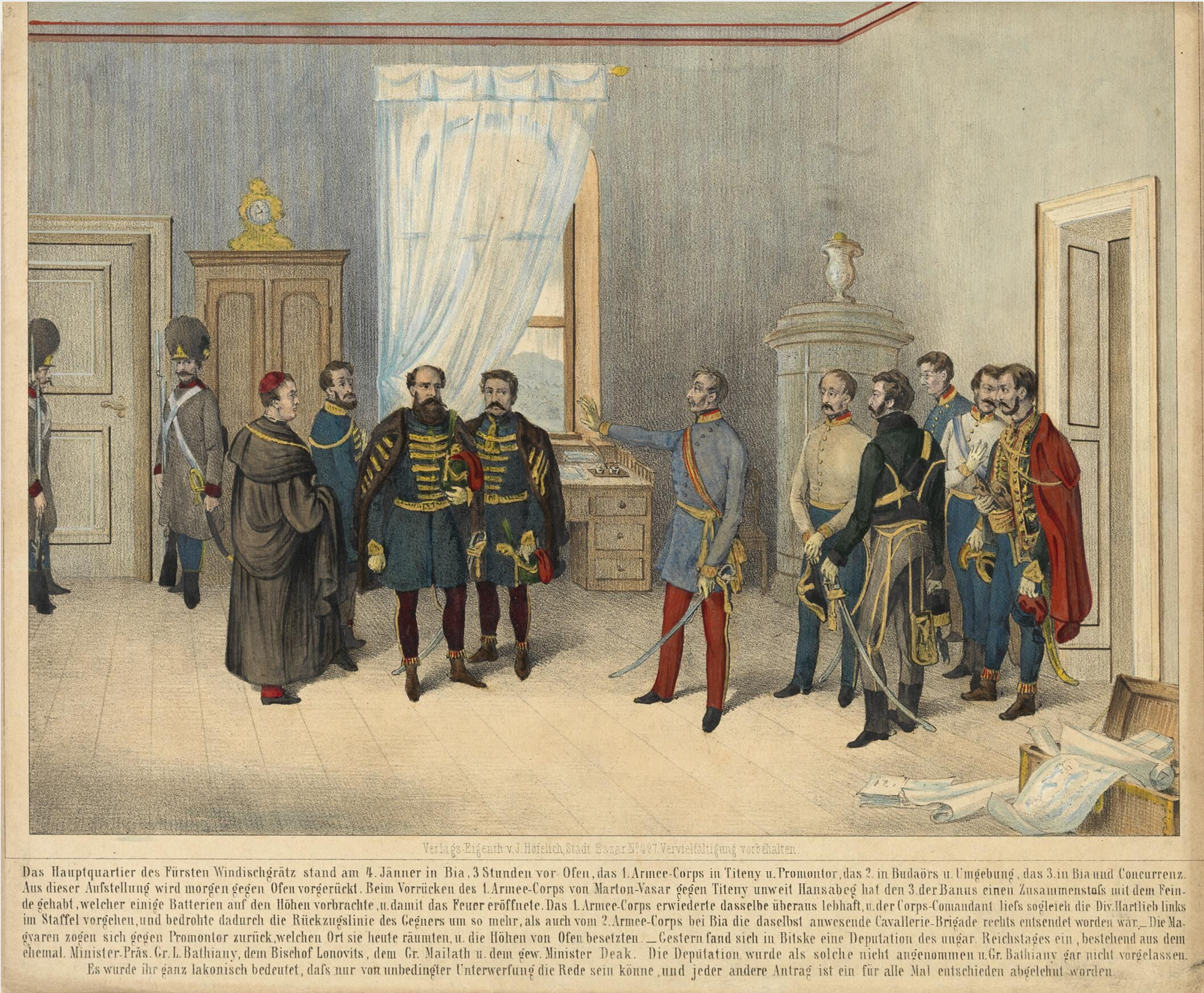
Windischgratz refuses to talk to the Hungarian parliamentary delegation on 4 March 1849 in Pest. The image depicts the members of the Hungarian delegationː Lajos Batthyány, Ferenc Deák, József Lonovics, György Majláth-Székely

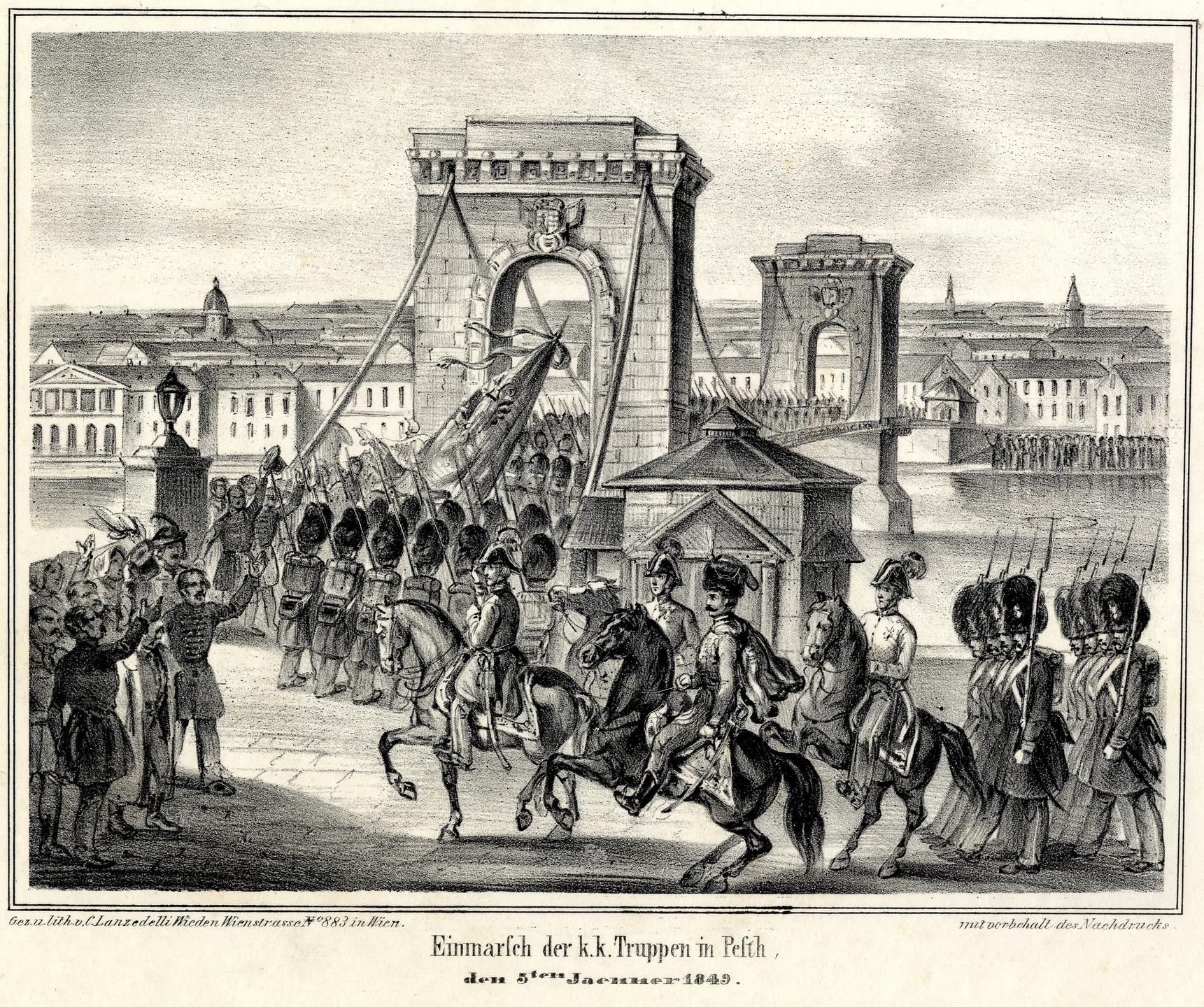
Austrian troops entering Pest on 5 January 1849 (Karl Lanzedelly)

On 2 January, before the evacuation of the capital, a military council was held, which decided to concentrate Hungarian forces in Tiszántúl (the region east of the Tisza River). The adopted operation plan stated that the Upper Tisza Corps and the Perczel Corps would take up positions along the Tisza. To allow enough time for this to happen, General Görgei's Upper Danube Corps had to conduct a diversion operation in north-western Hungary to relieve the besieged Lipótvár, then retreat to east through the mining towns to the Upper Tisza. Because of the defeat on 4 January of the Upper Tisza Corps at Kassa, a few days later the plan was complemented with the order of the abandonment of Bácska and Banat, and the transfer of the troops there to the Central Tisza region.

On 3 January 1849, Görgei's hussars repulsed Jelačić's troops in the Battle of Tétény, then crossed to the left bank of the Danube. The last Hungarian troops left Pest on 5 January, and the K.u.K. army occupied the capital the same day. Now Windisch-Grätz believed that he had won the war and therefore did not move from Buda and Pest, and the two weeks gained by the Hungarians were enough to consolidate the Hungarian defenses. along the Tisza

==== The Vác Manifesto ====
Before the retreat from the capitals, the former officers of the Imperial Army were abandoning en masse Görgei's Upper Danube Corps. In order to resolve this very grave problem, Görgei issued a declaration at Vác on 5 January 1849, in which he announced the political principles for which his army was willing to fight against the invaders.

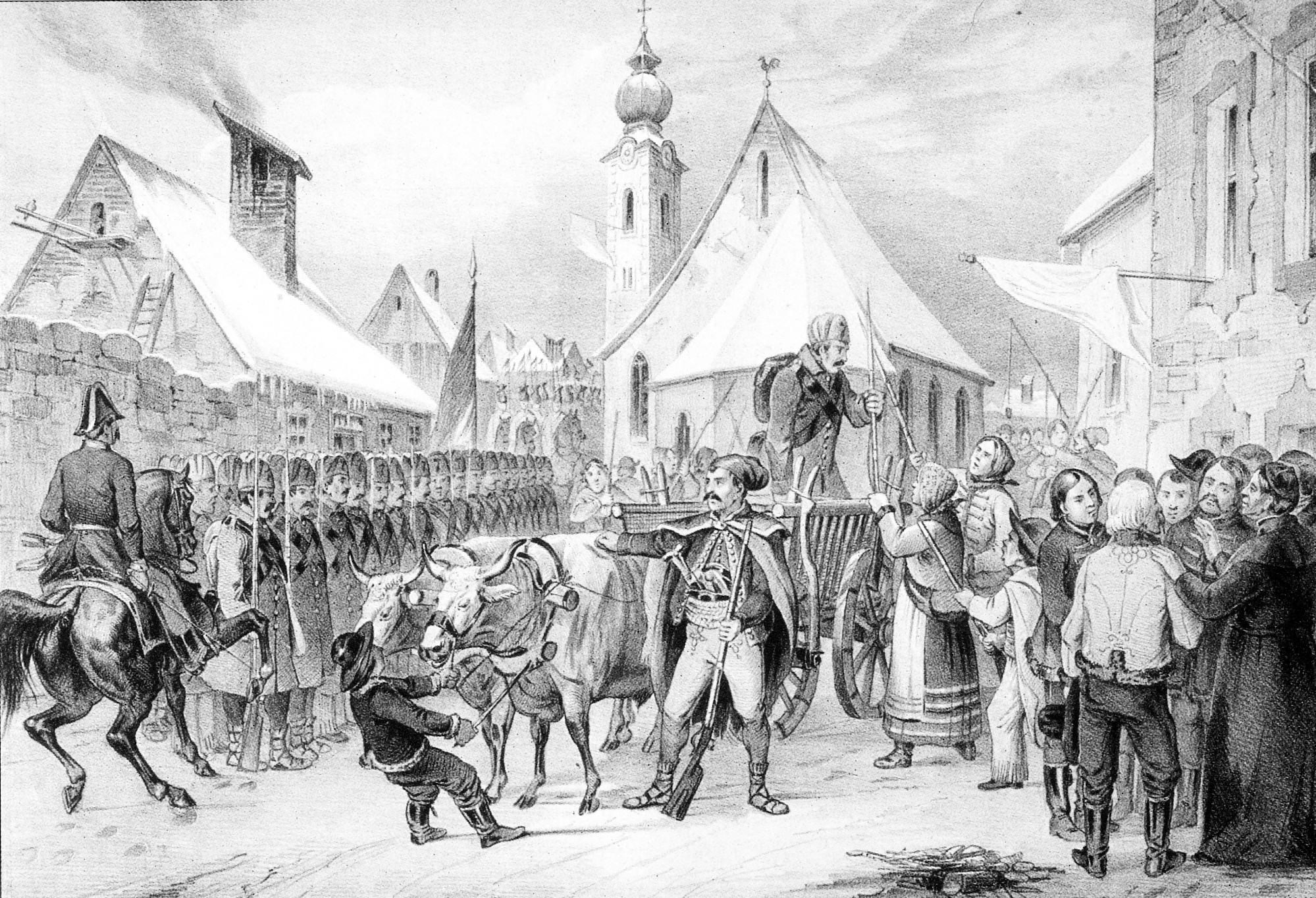
Austrian and Croatian troops disarm the Hungarian population in the region of Győr (Armee Bulletin IV)

The manifesto was necessary to restore the self-confidence of the Hungarian army, which had been badly damaged by the constant retreat, the conflicting orders of the government, and the departure of a significant number of officers who had previously served in the K.u.K. Army.

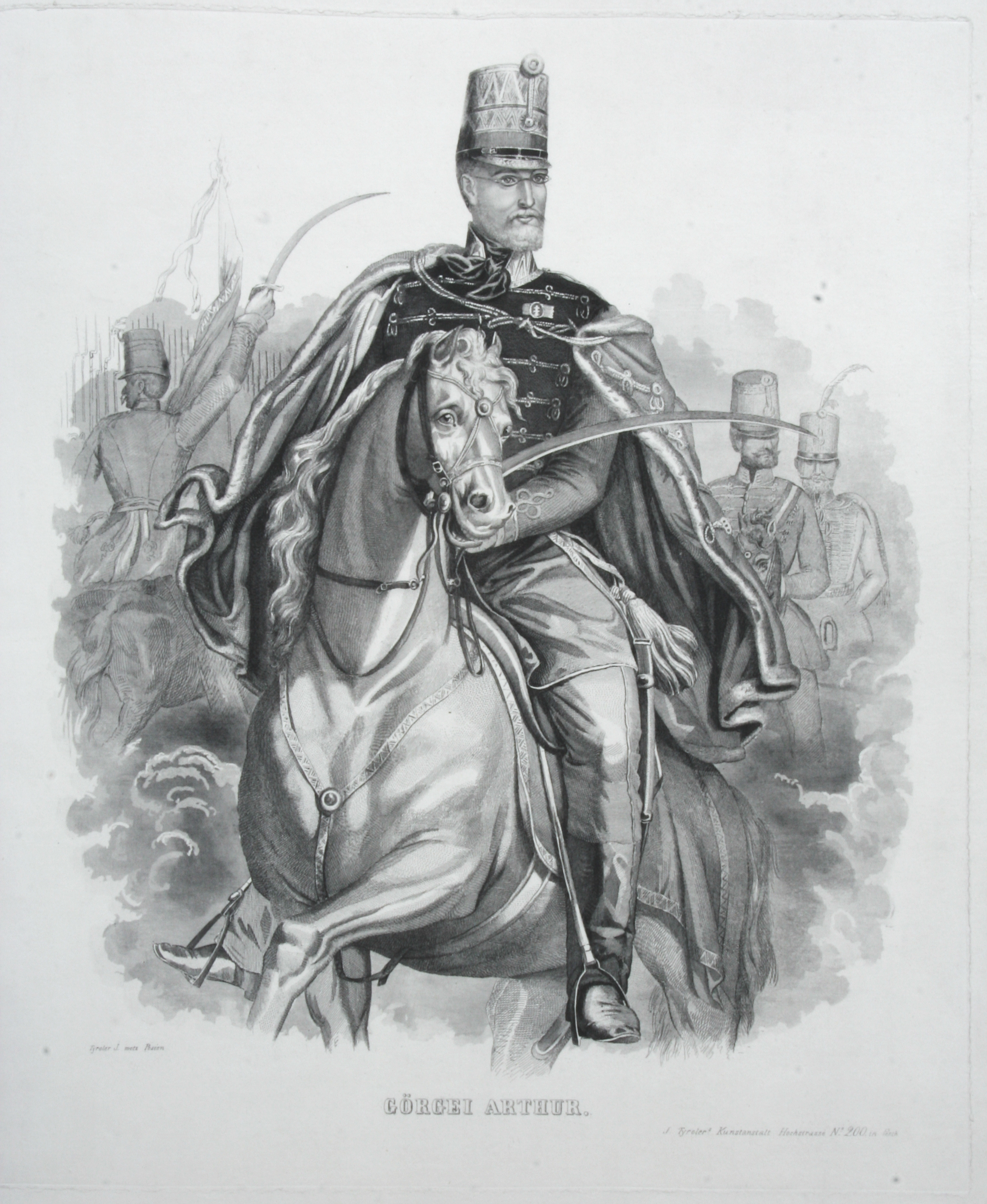
Artúr Görgei

The so-called Vac Declaration is actually made of two parts. In the first part, Görgei exercises some serious self-criticism, explaining to his soldiers which is the cause of the situation that led to the army's loss of confidence. He then criticizes the Kossuth-led National Defence Committee (OHB), which substituted the government. He accuses OHB of having boasted that it would stay in the capital until the end, but then fled the city at the news of the imperial troops' approach, demoralizing the inhabitants. He also deplores the republican propaganda of the Committee, pointing out that many non-Hungarian officers who had hitherto stood by the Hungarian cause, would only continue to do so if Hungary while refusing to recognize Franz Joseph's illegitimate seizure of power, remained under the Habsburg crown, recognizing Ferdinand V as Hungary's legitimate king.

The second part of the manifesto, therefore, to assure the loyalty of these remaining, experienced and indispensable officers, declared: I. The Army of the Upper Danube shall remain faithful to its oath, and shall resolutely fight all external enemies in the defense of the Constitution of Hungary, sanctioned by King Ferdinand V. II. With no less determination, however, it will oppose all those who would attempt to subvert the constitutional kingdom by premature republican agitations within the country.

This manifesto of Görgei deeply outraged the OHB. The driving force behind the OHB was Kossuth, so any criticism of the committee, which was expressed in the manifesto, was directed at Kossuth. This manifesto started the first conflict between Kossuth and Görgei, and one of the reasons why after the defeat of the Revolution, in his famous Vidin letter, Kossuth accused Görgei, quite unjustly, of treason. It was not only Kossuth who resented Görgei for the Vác Manifesto but also the radical pro-republican Hungarian politicians for his stand for his royalist attitude. However, most important for Görgei and Hungary at the time, was that this Manifesto restored the faith of the army and foreign officers. So the Hungarian army did not disintegrate, but continued to defend the country.

==== The retreat of the Army of the Upper Danube through northern Hungary ====
According to the plan of the campaign through Upper Hungary, Görgei had to march to the region of the Upper Tisza, but through Northern Hungary, thus giving the impression that he was threatening Vienna.

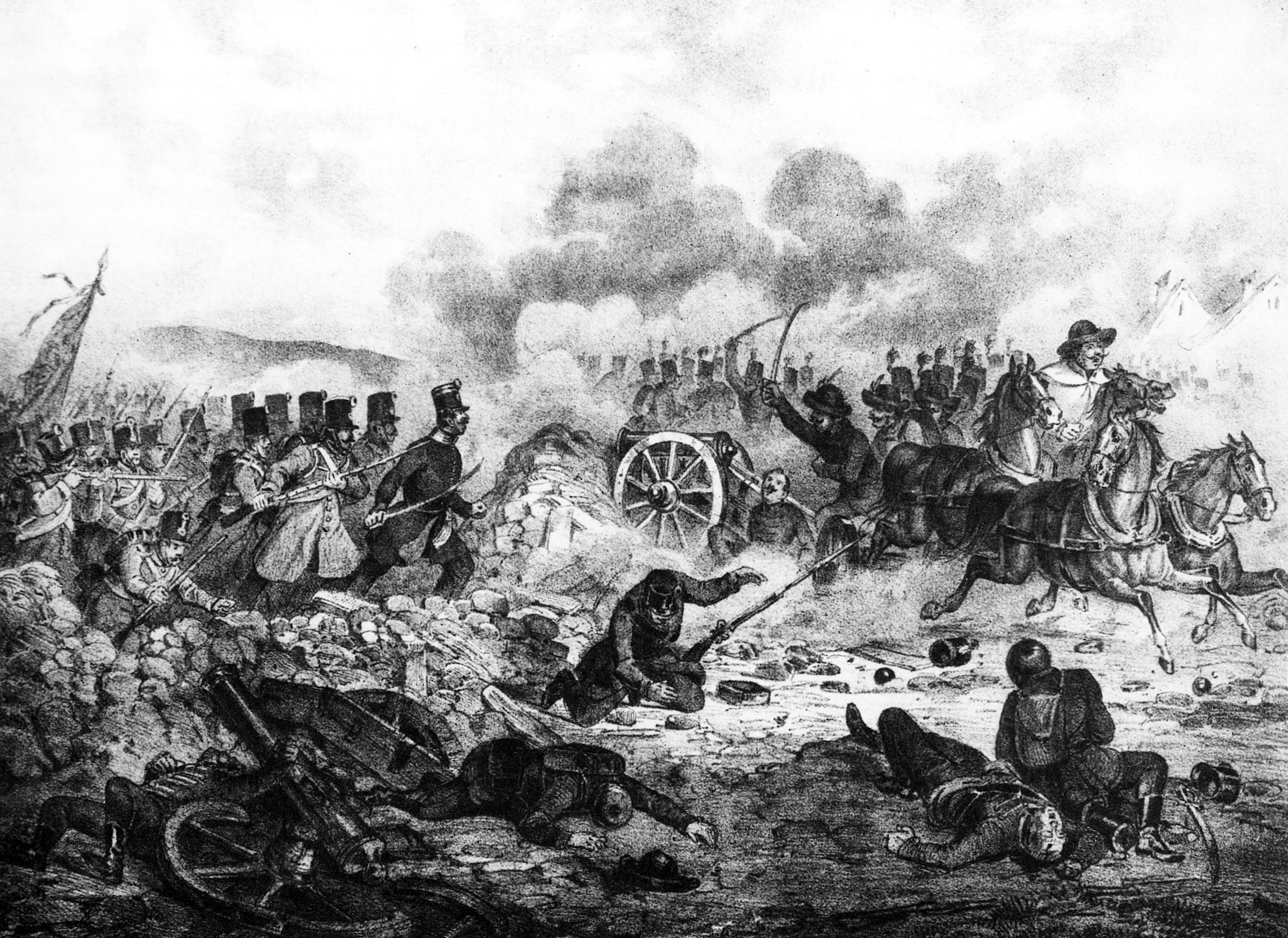
Battle of Turcsek 15 January 1849

The main advantage of this plan was that the threat posed by the march of Görgei's army northwards guaranteed that Windisgratz would not push towards Debrecen because he would not dare to lose Vienna. After the retreat from the capital, Görgei's troops moved towards Lipótvár according to the operation plan of the military council from 2 January.

Görgei's 13,000-strong Upper Danube Corps, consisting of the divisions led by Colonel Lajos Aulich, Colonel Richard Guyon, and Lieutenant Colonel György Kmetty, marched from Vác to Körmöcbánya. On 21–22 January, Görgei scored minor success in the Battle of Szélakna against the troops of Lieutenant General Anton Csorich, who were pursuing him and trying to surround him, but he was defeated in the battles of Selmec and Hodrusbánya.

From there, they escaped the enemy's encirclement by marching through a mine tunnel under the Szkalka mountain belonging to the Körmöc mountain range to Besztercebánya.

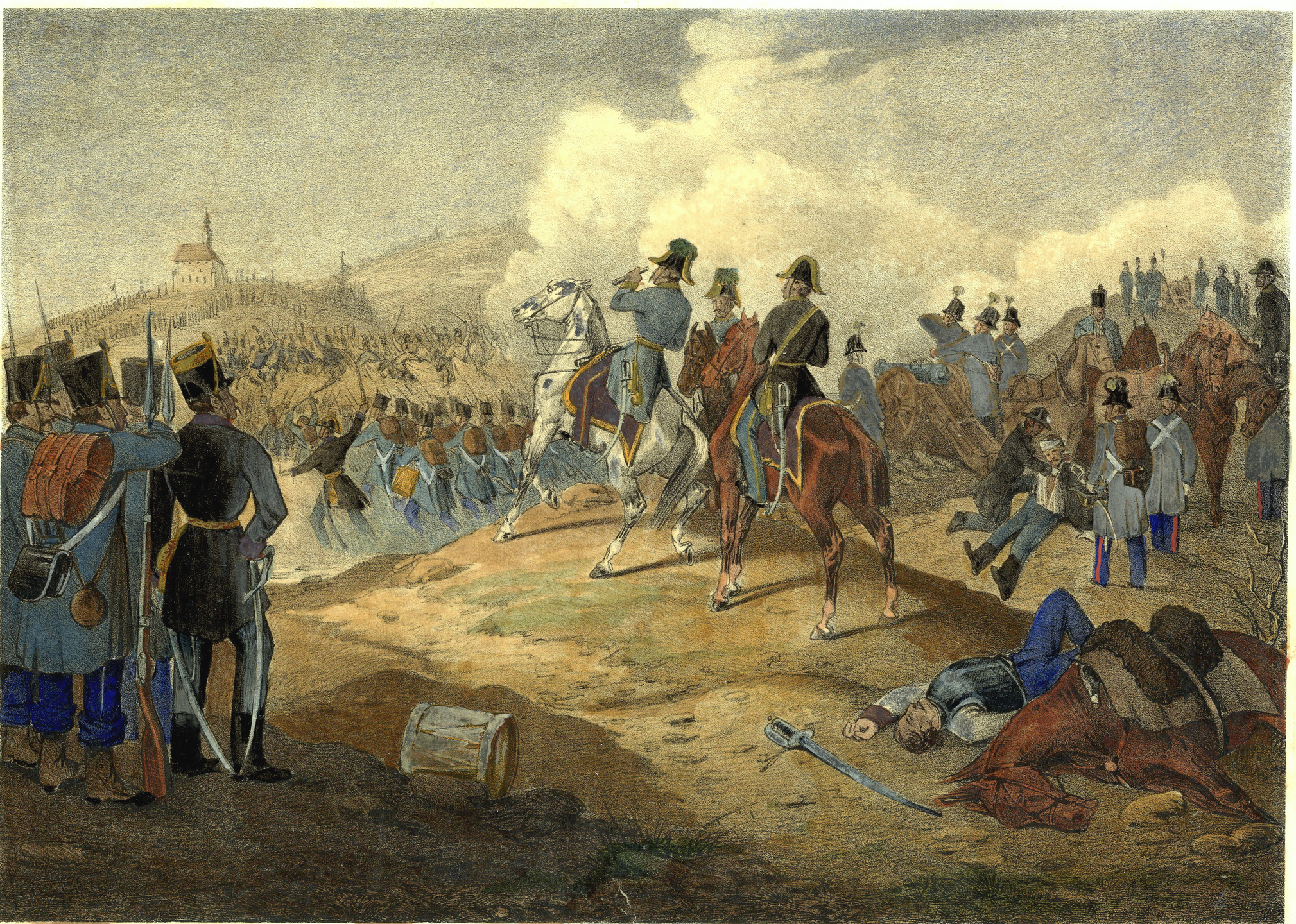
Battle of Selmecbánya, 22 January 1849 (Armée-Bulletin XVIII)

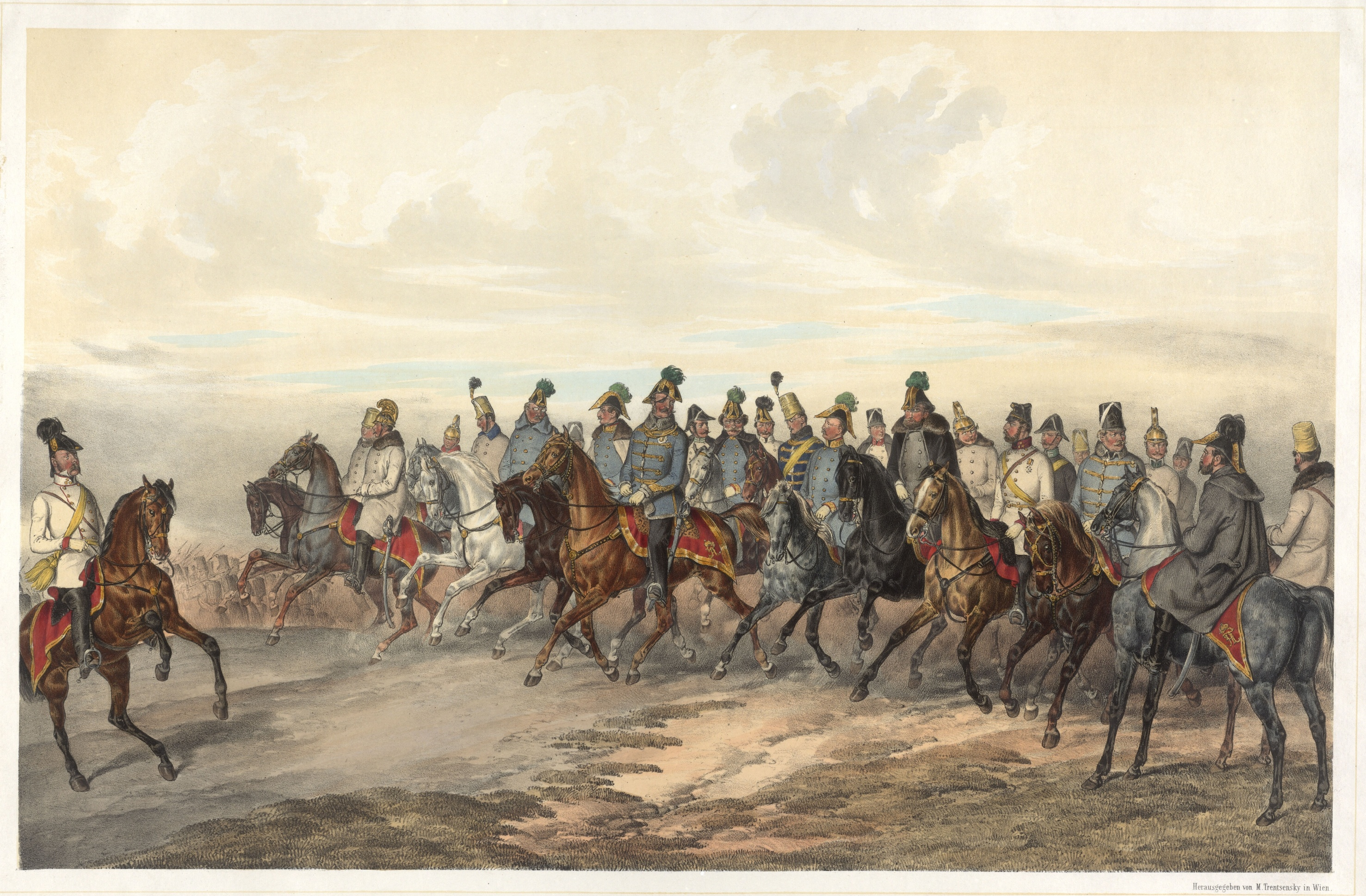
Lieutenant General Franz Schlik and his staff (Matthias Trentschensky)

Görgei was in a dangerous position because of the pursuit of the outnumbering Imperial armies, but after Mór Perczel's attack towards Szolnok and Cegléd (22 and 25 January), the Imperial commander-in-chief Windisch-Grätz was frightened, believing that Perczel would march against Pest, ordered Csorich to come to his aid with two brigades, thus weakening the troops pursuing Görgei. 2 Slovak battalions also joined the Hungarians in the mining towns. At Besztercebánya the army led by Görgei split up and continued its march eastwards on separate routes. The northern column - with Görgei, Aulich, and Kmetty - pushed through the Sturec Pass, while the southern column led by Guyon marched through the Garam valley to the meeting point at Lőcse. On 2 February, Guyon was surprised by the garrison in the Battle of Igló, suffering heavy casualties.

Görgei's pursuit was significantly hampered by the resistance of the outdated fortress of Lipótvár to the Austrian siege, whose guards finally surrendered only on 2 February after the start of the bombardment of the K.u.K. artillery. The K.u.K. troops pinned down under the fortress could help considerably the operation against Görgei or the encirclement of Komárom, which was firmly in Hungarian hands.

=== Consolidation of the Hungarian defense along the Tisza ===
On 22–25 January, Mór Perczel, appointed with the defense of the Central Tisza region, crossed the river and defeated General Ferenc Ottinger's cavalry brigade in the First Battle of Szolnok and in the Cegléd, and drove it near Pest.

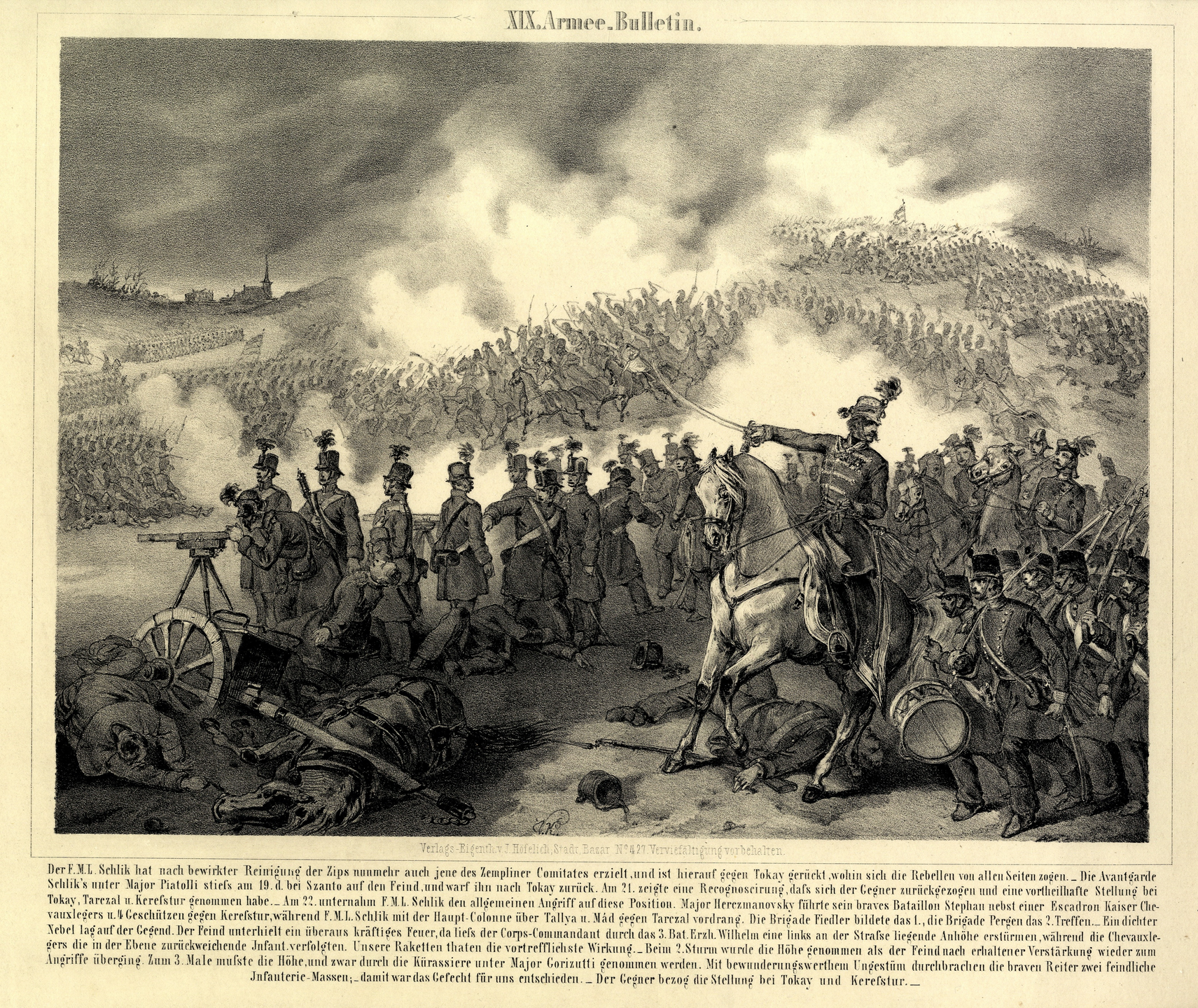
Battle of Tokaj 22 January 1849 (Armée Bulletin XIX) by Winzenz Katzler

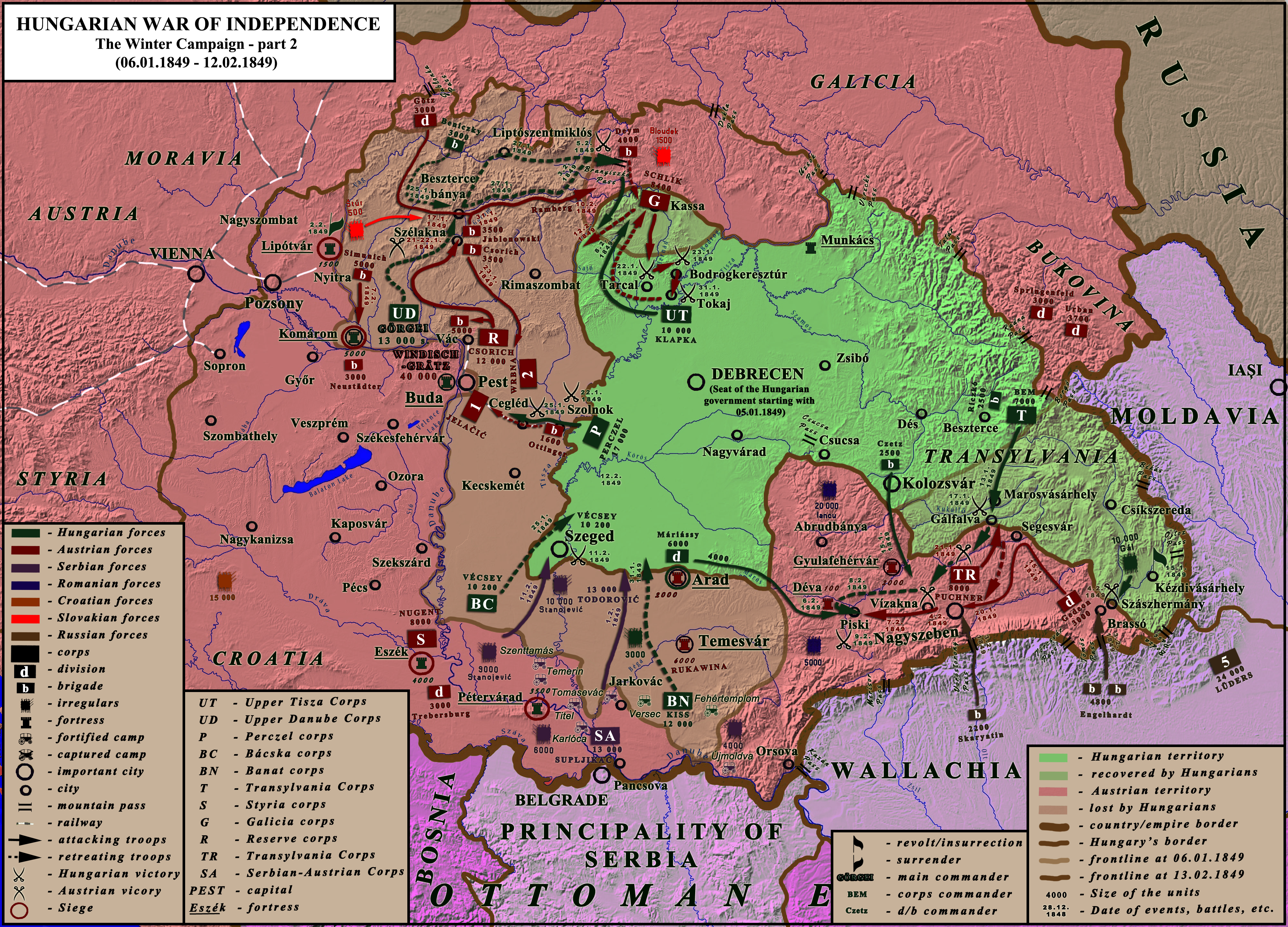
The Military Situation in Hungary between 06.01.1849-12.02.1849

In the Upper Tisza region, with reinforcements coming from Pest, Colonel György Klapka arrived to replace the unsuccessful Lázár Mészáros. After the victory of Kassa from 4 January, Franz Schlik was busy with the pacification of the eastern part of Upper Hungary, and this time was sufficient for Klapka to reinforce and reorganize the Hungarian troops. Schlik renewed his attack against the Hungarians only on 17 January. But on 22–23 January Klapka's troops repulsed this attack in the Battles of Tarcal and Bodrogkeresztúr. At the end of January, Schlik received reinforcements from Windisch-Grätz and launched another offensive. Klapka therefore abandoned the Bodrog line and retreated to the Tisza line. And when Schlik's troops renewed his, on 31 January Klapka defeated them again in the Battle of Tokaj. After this series of defeats, Schlik began his retreat towards Kassa. But here another danger waited for him. On 5 February Görgei's troops in the Battle of Branyiszkó, broke through the Austrian garrison defending the heavily fortified mountain pass, ending their march towards the Tisza through Upper Hungary. Now they approached Kassa, and Schlik started to feel in danger of being encircled by Görgei's troops from the northwest and Klapka's troops from the south.

== Operations in Southern Hungary ==
=== Offensive operations against the Serbs ===
With the onset of winter, the Hungarian armies attempted to put down the Serbian uprising. They launched a strong offensive.

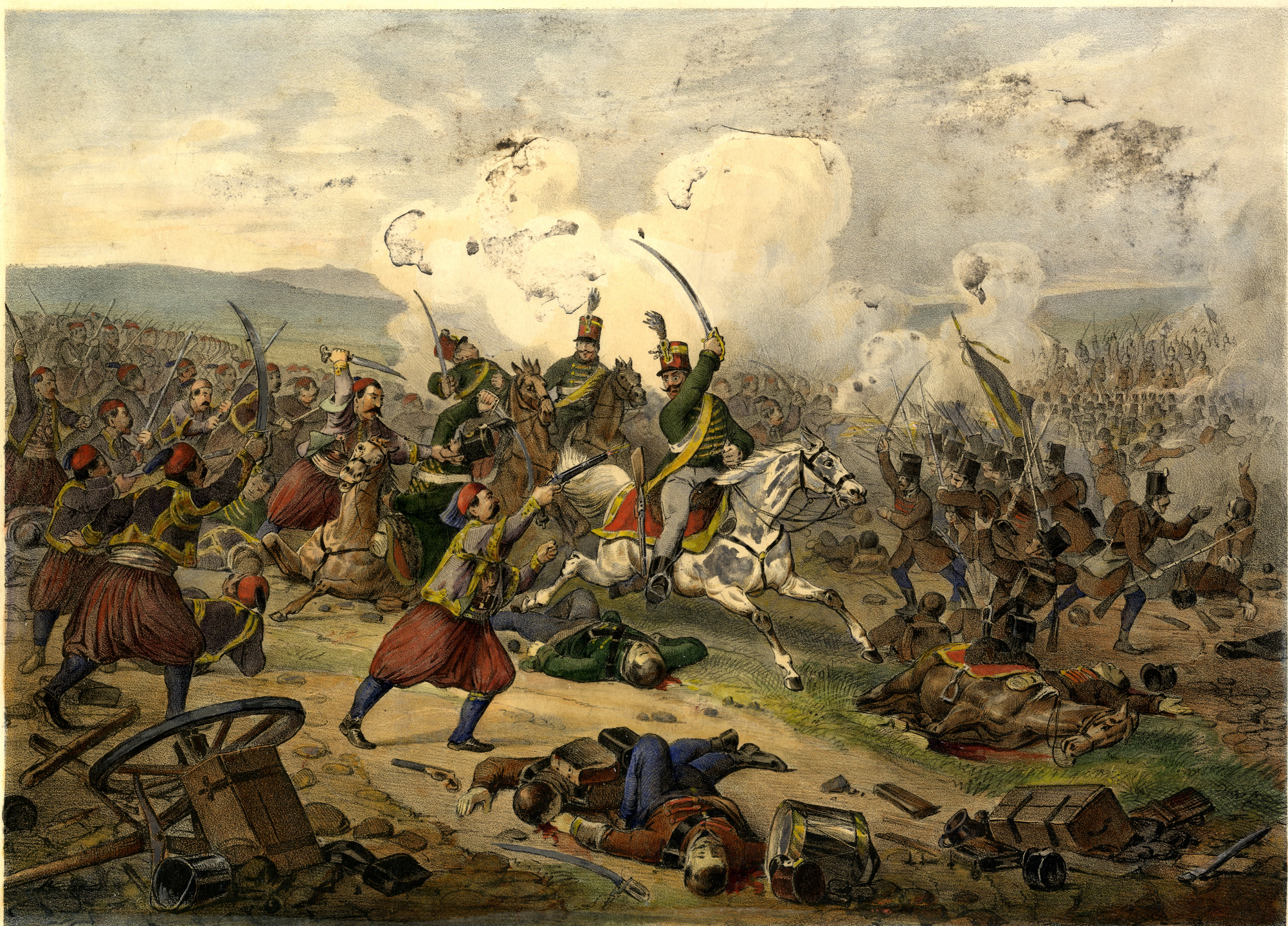
Battle of Jarkovác between Hungarian and Serb troops (15 December 1848)

Starting with the On 30 November, Hungarian troops in Banat occupied Ördöghídja, on 4 December Tomasevác, on 12 December Károlyfalva and Alibunár, and, on 15 December, in the Battle of Jarkovác, Colonel János Damjanich inflicted a heavy defeat on the Serbian troops who were laying an ambush on his troops.

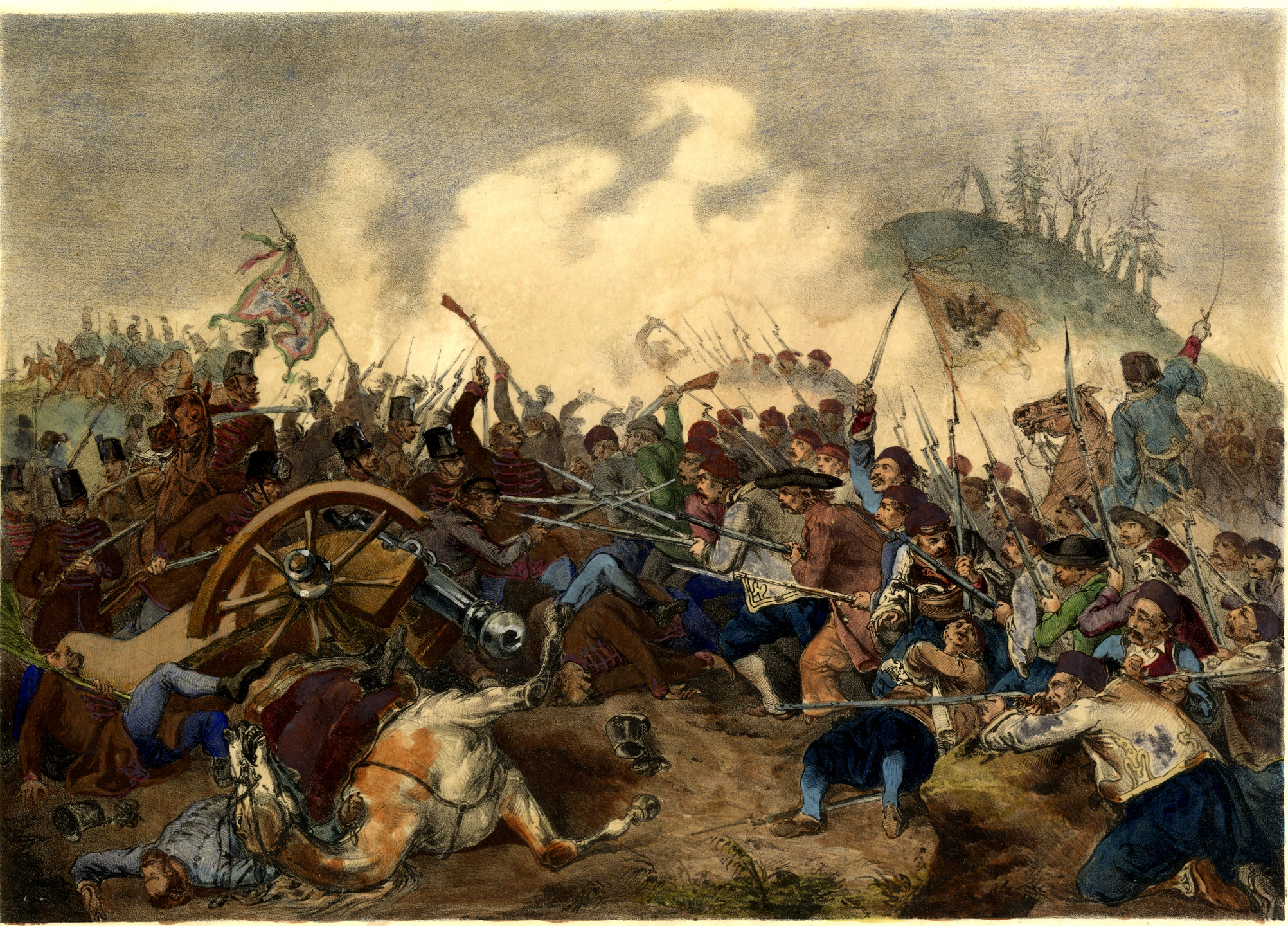
Battle of Pancsova (2 January 1849. január) - Hofelich

In contrast, the Hungarian troops had much less success against the fortresses of Banat in Austrian hands. On 3–4 December, Lieutenant–Colonel János Máriássy, commander of the besieging army of Arad, attempted to take the fortress by ambush, but the attack failed. On 14 December, the Imperial troops from Temesvár broke the siege of Arad and supplied the garrison with enough food for several weeks. By the end of the year, however, Arad was surrounded by a loose encirclement.

On 2 January, the Hungarian army led by Lieutenant General Ernő Kiss tried to inflict a decisive blow on the Serbs, but in the Battle of Pancsova, they suffered a heavy defeat by the Serbs. Following the battle, Hungarian colonels such as János Damjanich and József Nagysándor blamed the chief commander, Ernő Kiss, for the defeat. Kiss was dismissed, and Damjanich was appointed commander of the Banat Corps.

=== Abandonment of Bácska and Banat ===
On 16 January 1849 the government sent an order to the two southern corps (the Banat and the Bácska Corps) to give up all the Hungarian positions South of the Maros River, and to march immediately to the middle line of the Tisza, to defend that line against the Austrian main forces, then to participate in an eventual counter-attack.

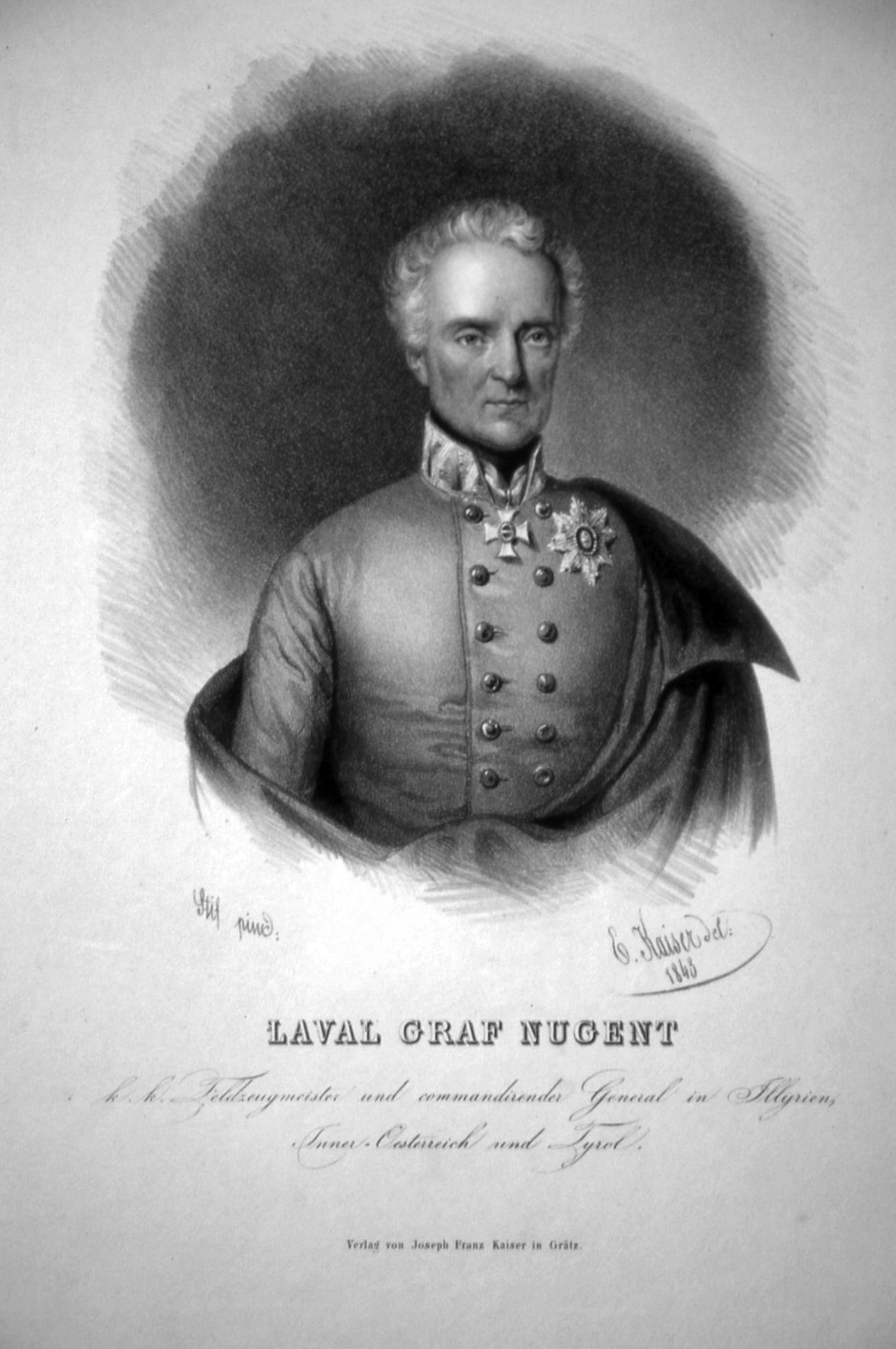
Laval Nugent

As a result of this, at the end of the month, the Hungarian troops gave up Bácska and Banat, retreating to the Maros line, and the Serbian and K.u.K. forces from the South began their advance towards Szeged and Arad.

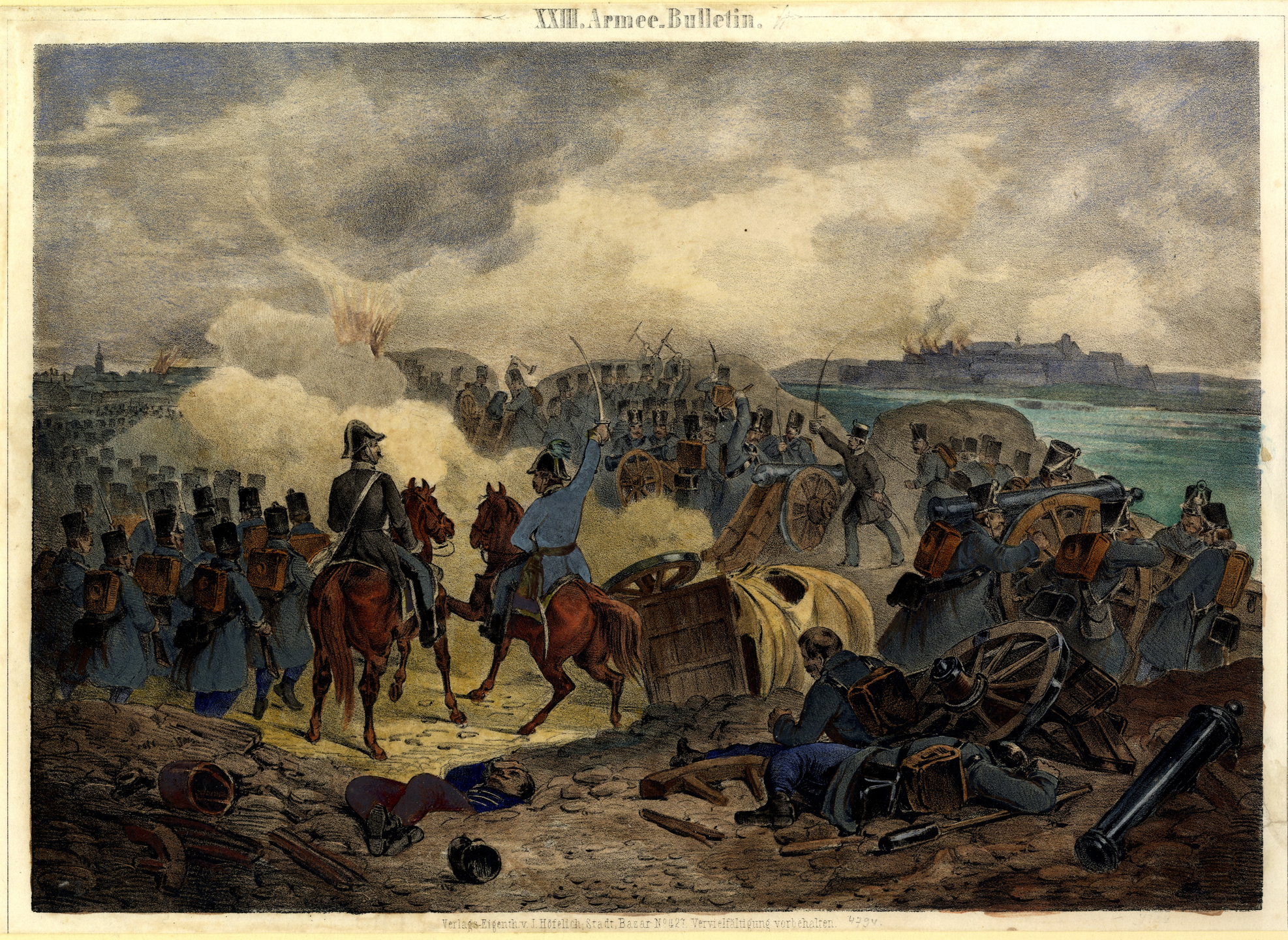
Battle of Arad, 26 February 1849

At the same time, the South Transdanubia also fell into the hands of the imperial troops led by Field Marshal Laval Nugent. Already at the end of January 1849, the Slavonian Imperial troops started to surround Eszék, and after a short siege, the fortress capitulated on 14 February, upon the promise of amnesty for the garrison. In January 1849, during the evacuation of the South, the Hungarians supplied the garrison of Pétervárad (the only fortress in the South that remained in Hungarian hands) with enough food for five months. In February 1849, the Imperial troops led by Field Marshal Nugent began to surround Pétervárad, but did not attempt a serious siege.

The Hungarian troops retreated to the Maros line. After conquering most of Bácska and Banat, the Serbs attempted to take possession of this line and to come into contact with the main K.u.K. forces advancing in the Danube–Tisza Interfluve. On 8 February in the Second Battle of Arad, Lieutenant-General Joseph Glaeser's troops broke the Hungarian siege of Arad and supplied the garrison with enough food and ammunition for several weeks. The Hungarian troops recaptured the city, but it took weeks to complete the siege lock again. On 11 February, a Serbian detachment occupied Újszeged and started to bombard Szeged. The Hungarian troops led by Gusztáv Hadik retook Újszeged and the Serbs were driven back to Szőreg.

== Operations in Transylvania ==
=== The Székely resistance from Háromszék ===
By the end of November, the Hungarian troops had been pushed back to the western border of Transylvania, around Csucsa. Only the remote Székely seat of Háromszék in the south-eastern part of Transylvania remained loyal to the Hungarian government. There the revolutionary administration managed to mobilize the whole society,

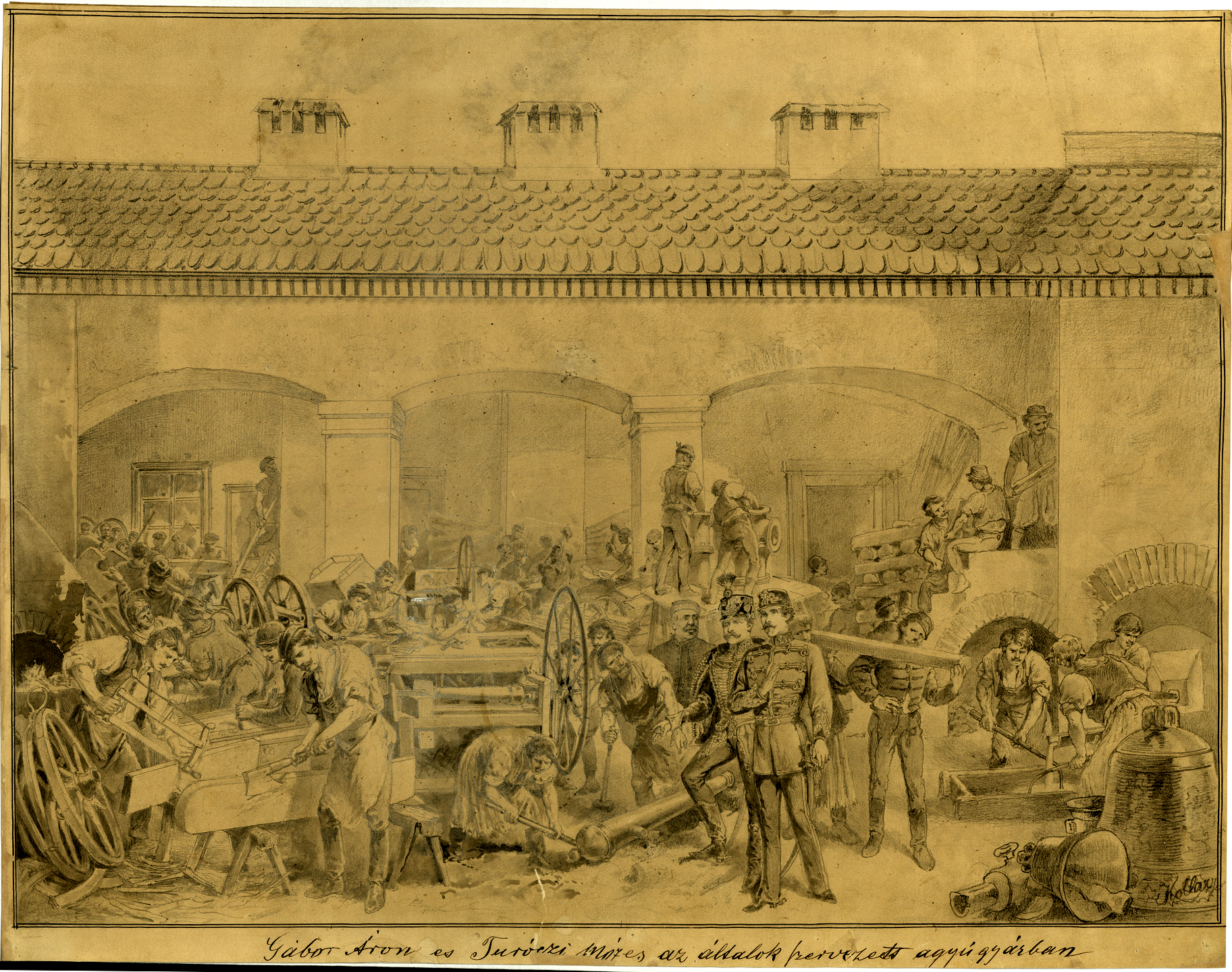
Áron Gábor and Mózes Turóczi in the Székely gun foundry at Kézdivásárhely (1849) - by Kollarz Franz

and a clever Székely handyman, Áron Gábor, even cast cannons from the church bells. Following considerable efforts, Háromszék organized an army of 10–12,000 men led by Károly Dobai, Sándor Sombori, and Sándor Gál to confront the imperial troops. When the General Commando tried to put down their resistance, the Székelys defeated the imperial troops and the supporting Romanian and Saxon militias at Földvár on 30 November, at Szászhermány on 5 December and Rika on 13 December, and invaded Barcaság (Burzenland), threatening the imperial rule in Eastern Transylvania.

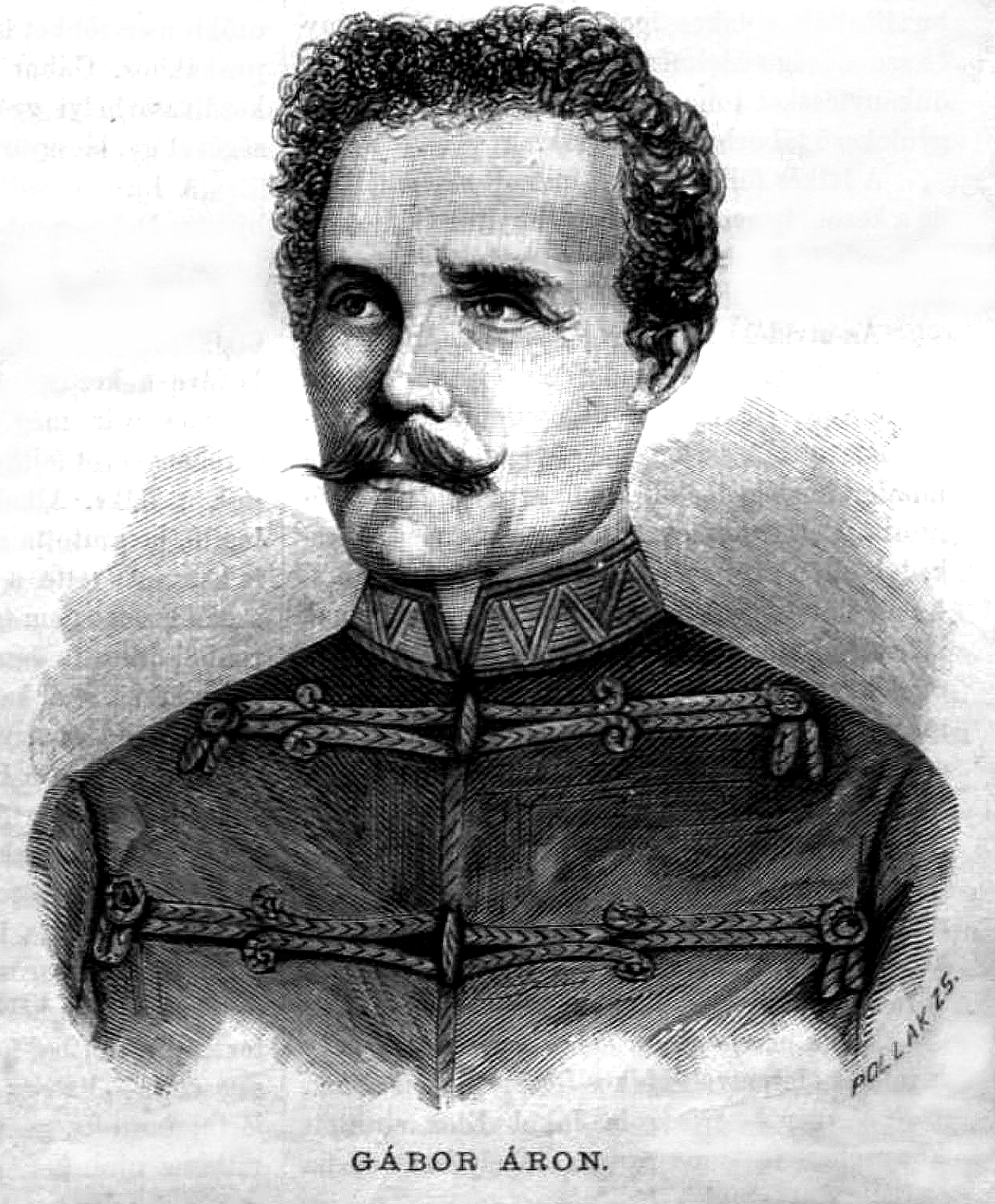
Áron Gábor

For this reason, Puchner transferred Schurtter's brigade to Háromszék, with the help of which the Austrians defeated the Székely troops in the Battle of Hídvég on 24 December, then on 2 January 1849, the compromise treaty of Árapatak was concluded. According to this treaty, the imperials did not occupy Háromszék, the Székely border guards were allowed to keep their weapons, the Hungarian soldiers from other regions who fought with the Székelys had to be removed from the territory of the Seat, and the cannon barrels were to be re-cast into bells. By concluding this treaty, Háromszék bought time until the victorious armies of Lieutenant General Józef Bem arrived. On 15 January 1849, less than 2 weeks after it was concluded, the people of Háromszék denounced the treaty of Árapatak, and, together with Bem's army, continued their fight against the K.u.K. armies.

The resistance of Háromszék between 29 November and 28 December 1848 was not in vain, because, on the one hand, it tied down a significant enemy force, which was originally intended to attack Hungary, and, on the other hand, because Háromszék, through the military experience and preparedness gained during this resistance, contributed in a considerable measure to General Bem's successful Spring Campaign to retake Transylvania.

=== Bem's campaign ===
==== Capture of Northern Transylvania ====
At the beginning of December 1848, Polish General Józef Bem took command of the Hungarian troops that had been pushed back to the border of Transylvania. The Polish general soon won the trust and affection of the Hungarian soldiers, who called him "Papa Bem" among themselves.

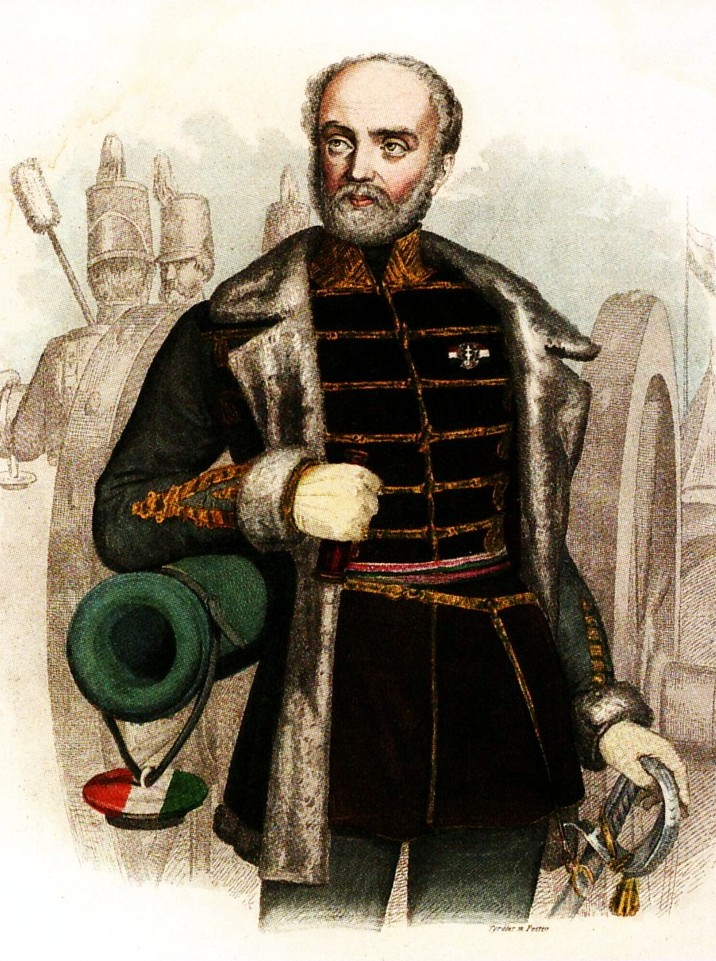
Józef Bem

On 15 December 1848, the Hungarian army in Transylvania consisted of 11,150 infantry, 1,385 cavalry, and 24 cannons in the Csucsa Strait, at Nagyvárad, in Szilágy County and Szatmárnémeti. The opposing Austrian regular forces numbered about 12 000 men, 60 guns and they had also 25 000-30 000 Romanian militias in support.

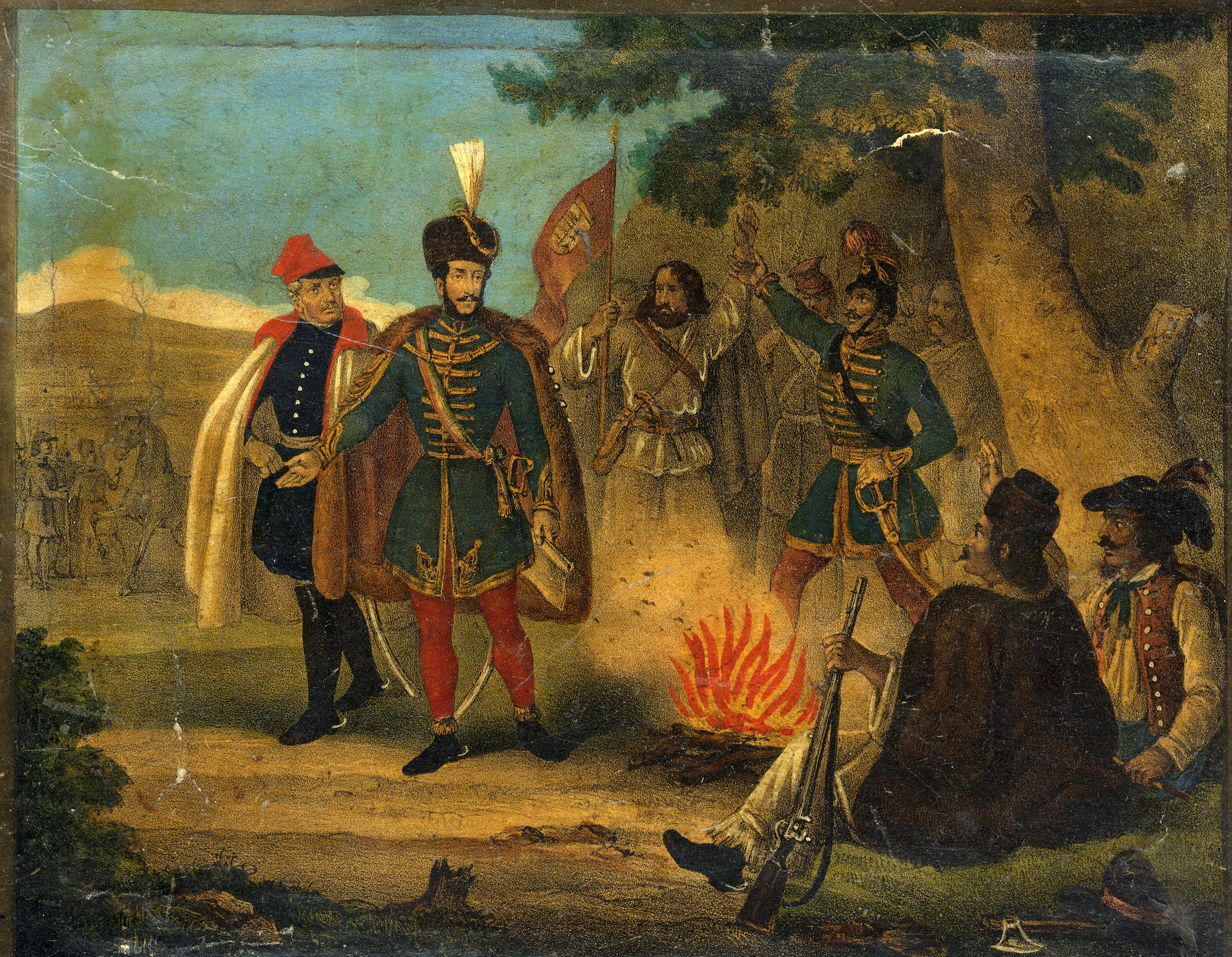
Lajos Kossuth visiting Bem's camping army

As we have seen above, in mid-December the Imperial troops launched an attack on Hungary from 9 directions. According to the orders of the imperial commander-in-chief, Field Marshal Windisch-Grätz, Puchner's task was to occupy Nagyvárad and march towards Debrecen. On 19–20 December, the Austrian troops attacked in three columns Bem's troops stationed at Csucsa and Zsibó, but after two days of fighting, their both attacks were repulsed. Bem then counter-attacked and on the 23rd he defeated Jablonski's brigade in the Second Battle of Dés, causing it to flee to Beszterce in northeastern Transylvania. Then Bem marched through Szamosújvár and Apahida to reach Kolozsvár on the 25th, from where the surprised Austrians fled without a fight towards Torda, leaving 100 prisoners and all their luggage in the hands of the Hungarians. One of the secrets of Bem's success was the long distances he covered in a short time through forced marches, which surprised the enemy: in 8 days he covered 190 km in minus 15 to 20 degrees Celsius. Bem, however, stood out not only for his abilities as a military commander but also for his conciliatory attitude towards the nationalities of Transylvania. On 27 December, he issued from Kolozsvár a trilingual (Hungarian, Romanian, German) proclamation, promising amnesty and equal rights for every nationality. Then, after sending Lieutenant-Colonel János Czetz towards Torda on the 26th, Bem moved towards Beszterce, captured a platoon of border guards in the Battle of Bethlen on the 28th, and cut the Austrian troops in two, forcing them to retreat towards Bukovina. Bem's troops first defeated the two Austrian columns at Beszterce and Naszód on the 31st, then attacked them in the Battle of Tihuca on the 3rd of January 1849 and drove them into Bukovina. Bem pursued Urban's troops as far as Vatra Dornei in Bukovina, then returned to Transylvania. He left a garrison at Borgóprund-Jád-Beszterce and Naszód and then set off towards Székely Land and southern Transylvania.

On 13 January 1849, Bem captured Marosvásárhely. In mid-January, Lieutenant General Puchner advanced with his whole force - 2 infantry, 1 cavalry brigade, and 30 cannons - from Nagyszeben through Medgyes to Marosvásárhely, but on 17 January Bem crushed his army, and forced him to flee in the Battle of Gálfalva. He then followed the retreating Puchner to Nagyszeben.

==== Bem's retreat through South Transylvania ====
His successive victories so far had made Bem believe that he was capable of inflicting a decisive defeat on Puchner's imperial armies, so he attacked the latter's headquarters with his small force on 21 January, but Puchner repulsed him in the First Battle of Nagyszeben.

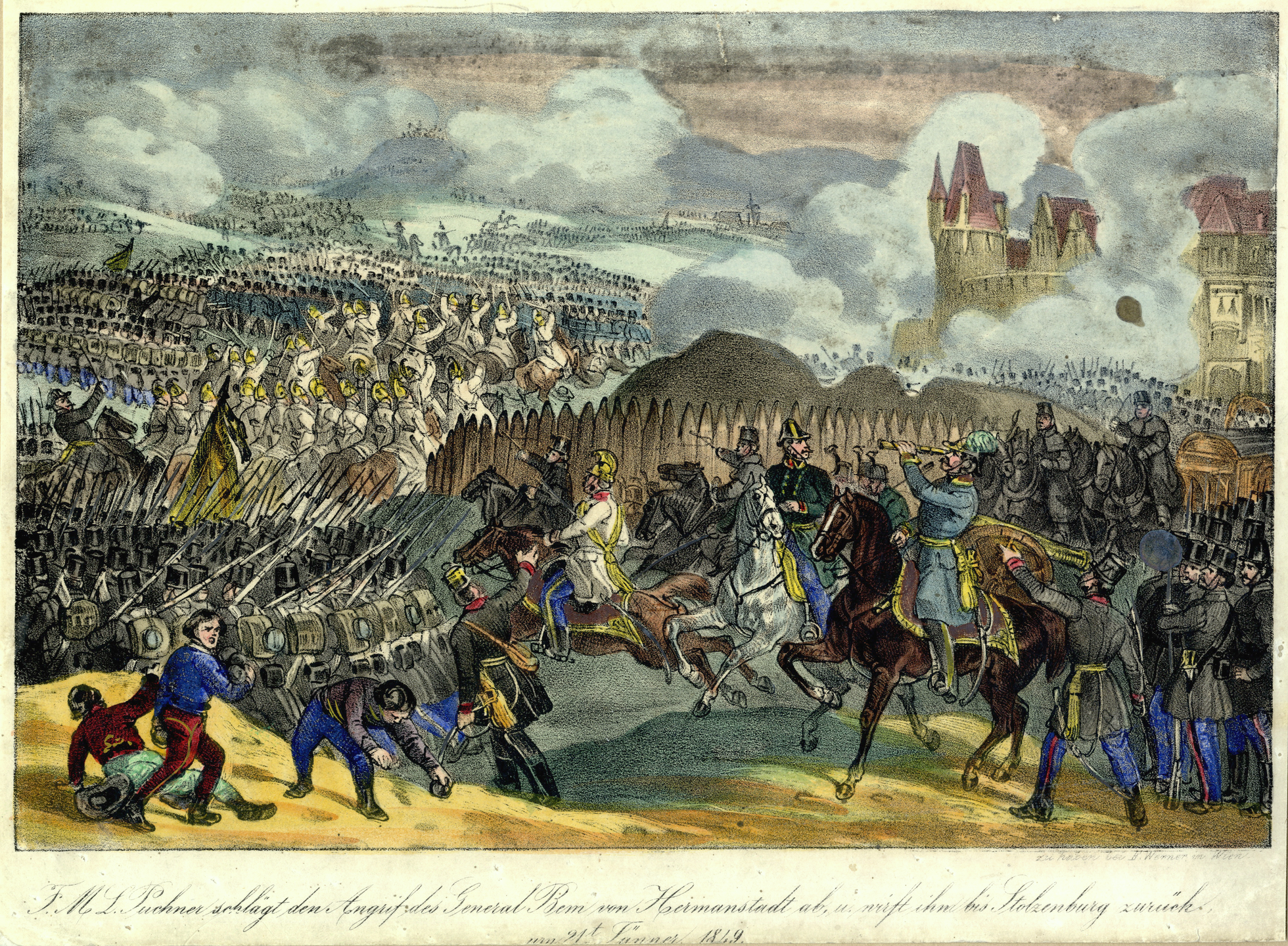
Battle of Nagyszeben 21 January 1849 between the Hungarian army led by Józef Bem and the Austrian troops led by Anton Puchner

On 30 January, Bem repulsed Puchner's three times bigger army's attack in the Battle of Szelindek but, realized that he would not be able to resist there for long with his weak forces. The situation was made even more difficult by the fact that, in early February, some 7,000 Russian troops had arrived from Wallachia to support Puchner, assuring the defense of the two main cities of Puchner's operational basis (Brassó and Nagyszeben), so the Austrian general could now turn all of his soldiers against the Hungarians. To make things even worse, Bem sent three battalions, a squadron of hussars, and a battery from his troops to Székely Land and to Déva to facilitate the arrival of reinforcements from there. As a result, he remained only with about 1730 infantry, 325 horsemen, and 24 cannons in the vicinity of Nagyszeben. On the morning of 4 February, in the Battle of Vízakna, Puchner, with at least 12,000 men and 30 cannons and supported by thousands of Romanian militias attacked Bem, who, despite his opponent's huge superiority, almost drove the enemy back at the beginning of the battle, but the Austrian counterattack swept away the Hungarians, who lost a quarter of their soldiers and a third of their cannons. Bem was almost captured.

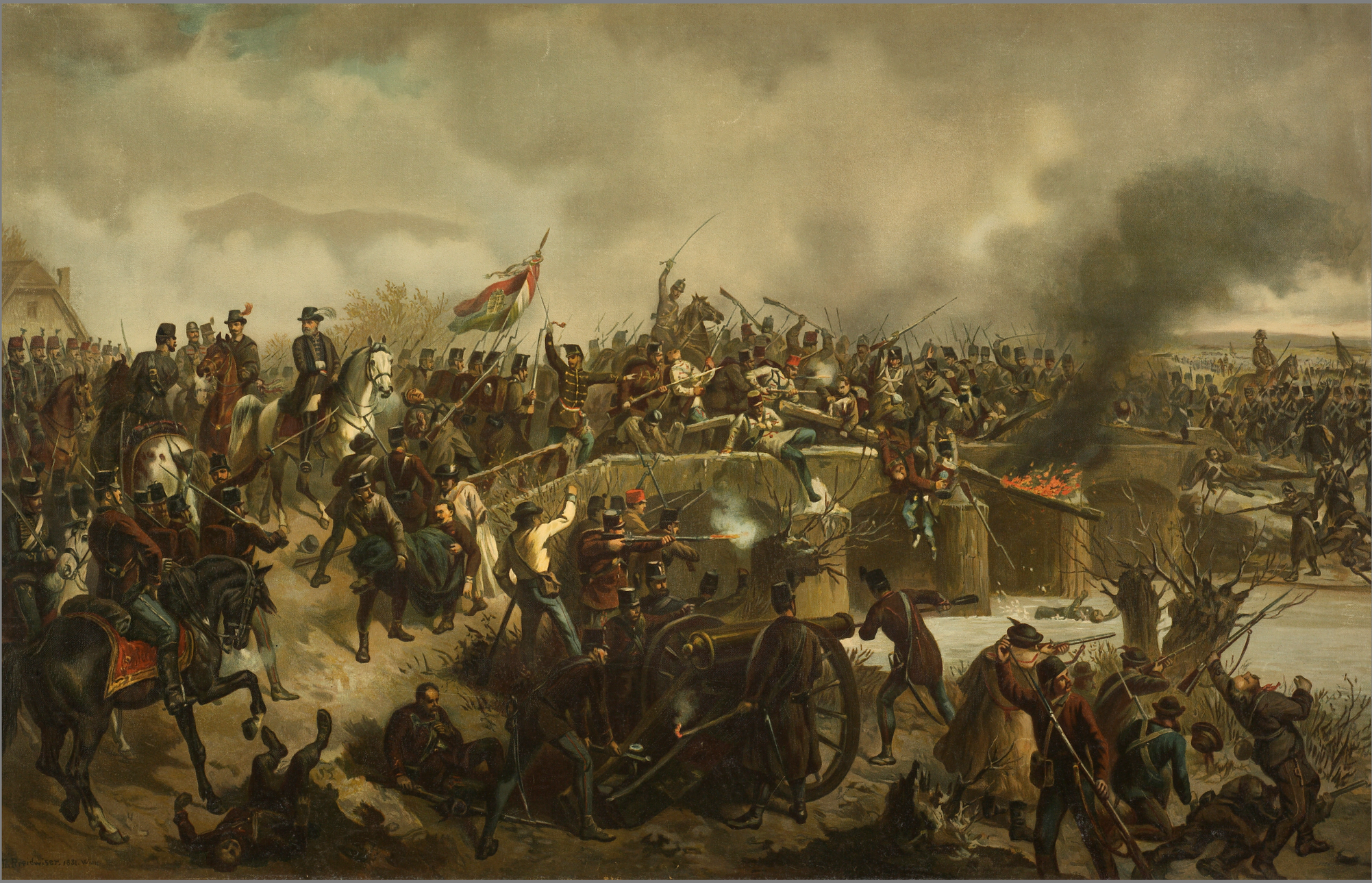
Battle of Piski by Breitwieser, Theodor

After the battle, Bem retreated through southern Transylvania, captured Szászsebes, and on the 7th he clashed with the Austrians in the Battle of Szászváros, where, to save his remaining cannons, he personally tried to defend them, but without success, being wounded. After this defeat, Bem, with his 1200 remaining soldiers, arrived at Déva and then retreated at Piski, where he was finally able to join the reinforcements sent by General János Damjanich, which increased his troops to 7000 men and 24 guns. It was here that he clashed with Puchner's army of about 8,000 soldiers and 26 cannons.

If this bridge is lost, the whole of Transylvania will be lost, he encouraged his soldiers. In the Battle of Piski on 9 February, he finally defeated Puchner, who was forced to retreat towards Nagyszeben.

After the victory in Piski, Bem had to rush to northern Transylvania, because Colonel Urban's troops invaded again from Bukovina, and on 18 February, in the Battle of Királynémeti they defeated the troops of Colonel Ignác Riczkó, who was killed in action. Bem defeated the already retreating enemy in the Battle of Borgóprund on 26 February, chasing him back in Bukovina and after that, there was no battle in Northern Transylvania until June 1849.

== The counterattack of the Hungarian main army and the Battle of Kápolna ==
At the end of January 1849, a concentration of the Hungarian troops behind the Tisza began. After Klapka's and Perczel's successes and Görgei's breakthrough at Branyiszkó, the time came for a counter-attack, but it was delayed. Kossuth appointed the Polish general Henryk Dembiński, who had arrived from France, to lead the concentrated main army.

His decision was also influenced by the fact that Kossuth misunderstood Görgei's Vác Manifesto and thought that the general wanted to disobey the National Defence Committee, and therefore did not want to give him the high command at any price.

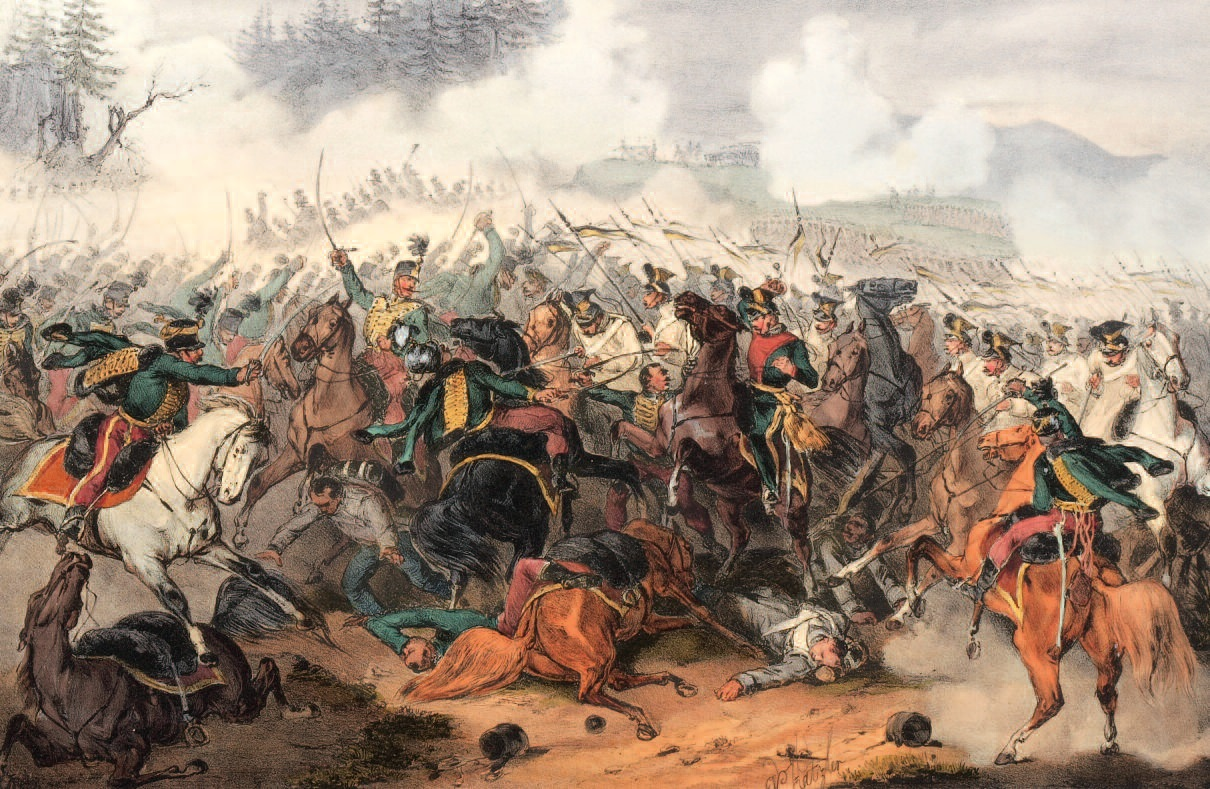
Cavalry battle at Kápolna. (J. Höfelich Armee Bulletin XXVI)

The appointment of Dembiński proved to be a bad choice. The Polish general quarrelled with almost all his subordinates as soon as he was appointed. Because of his wrong orders, he dispersed the forces at his disposal and also missed the opportunity to destroy Schlik's isolated army. So when Windisch-Grätz finally moved towards Debrecen at the end of February, only half of the Hungarian main force took part in the Battle of Kápolna on 26–27 February, and was defeated.

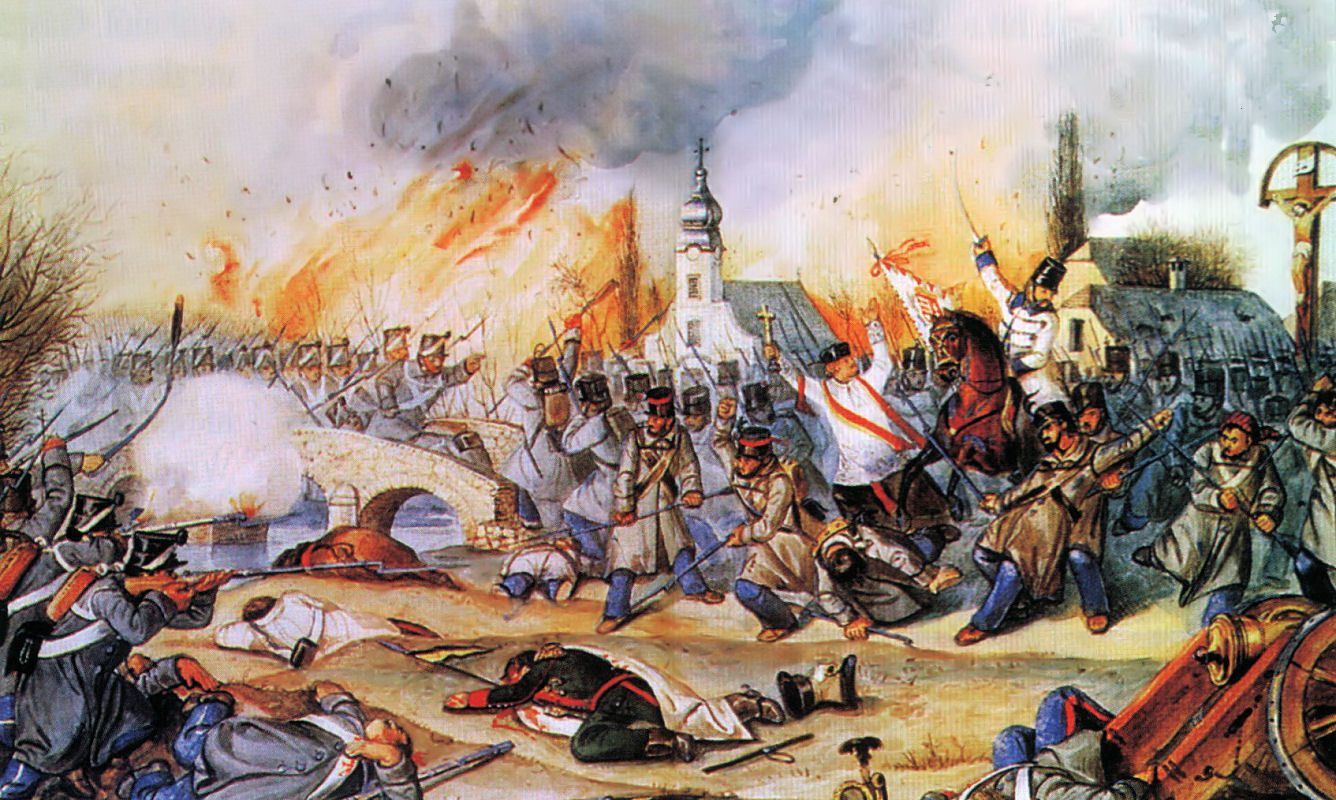
Than_Mor_Kapolnai_csata

During the retreat after the Battle of Kápolna, Dembiński again demonstrated his incompetence as a commander and refused to inform the Hungarian officers of his plans of war. Therefore, the disgruntled officers, with the assistance of Bertalan Szemere, the national commissioner, dismissed him from the high command on 3 March in Tiszafüred, and the outraged officers even arrested Dembiński. When Kossuth heard of all this, he hurried to Tiszafüred, and, suspecting that Görgei was behind this rebellion, he allegedly declared that he would have the Hungarian general executed. However, when he saw on the spot that the officers supported Görgei, he approved Dembiński's replacement and was forced to accept Szemere's earlier decision to appoint Görgei as provisional commander-in-chief.

Before the battle of Kápolna, it was planned that the divisions of Major Generals János Damjanich and Károly Vécsey to launch a diversionary attack at Szolnok, thus allowing the Hungarian main force to advance undetected. However, the Battle of Kápolna, fought too early, thwarted this plan. However, Damjanich and Vécsey still wanted to perform the attack, so on 5 March they attacked and defeated the Karger brigade in the Second Battle of Szolnok, where the Imperial troops lost about 500 men.

=== The imposed Constitution of Olmütz ===
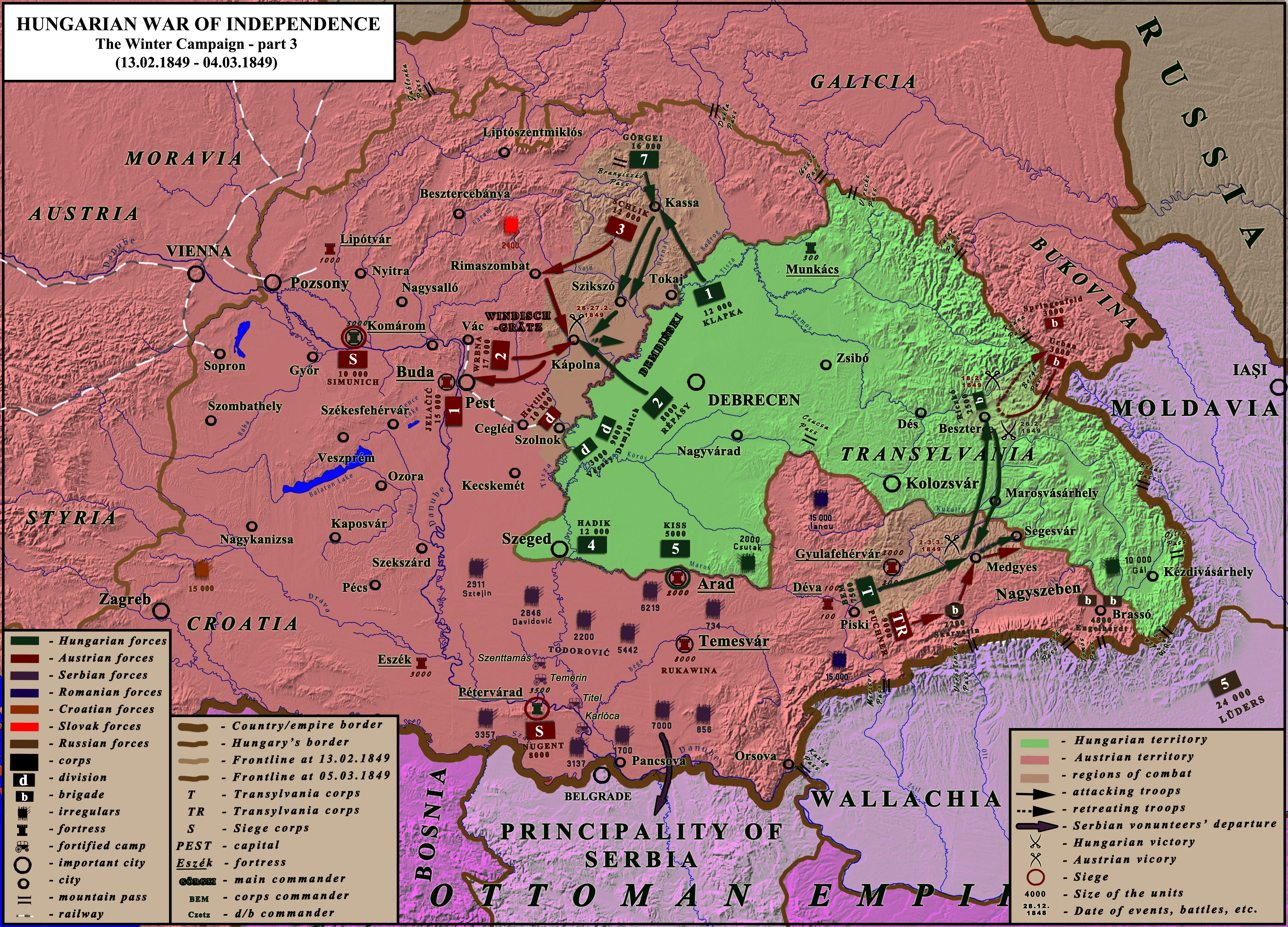
The Military Situation in Hungary between 13.02.1849-04.03.1849

Following the Battle of Kápolna, Windisch-Grätz sent a bragging, over-optimistic battle report to the imperial court in Olmütz:

I found the rebel hordes at Kápolna in terrible numbers, but I scattered them and destroyed most of them. The rest fled across the Tisza. I hope to be in Debrecen in a few days, and to capture the nest of the rebellion.

Reading this report, the imperial court believed that the Hungarians had been crushed once and for all, and that the time had come to settle the struggle between constitutionalism and absolutism definitively. On 4 March, by dissolving the Imperial Assembly from Kremsier, which was right then drawing up a democratic draft constitution, the emperor himself gave the people a constitution. This constitution, imposed by the emperor, repealed the Hungarian laws of April 1848 and abolished also the feudal constitution which was valid before 1848, thus terminating any trace of Hungary's internal autonomy. In addition, it separated Transylvania, Croatia, Slavonia, and the Partium from Hungary. The decree abolished and divided Hungary, which had been a unitary and independent kingdom inside the Habsburg Monarchy, into parts. All this effectively amounted to the incorporation of Hungary into the Austrian Empire. This constitution never came into force; it was delayed until it was repealed in 1851.

This constitution caused a huge outcry in Hungary and confirmed Kossuth's determination that Hungary should be formally declared independent from the Habsburg Empire because there was no longer any legal basis for compromise.

== Results and evaluation of the Winter Campaign ==
The imperial offensive launched in mid-December 1848 already foreshadowed disaster. At the time, the Hungarian army was still undergoing structural reforms, including the creation of a unified Ministry of War. Thus, the first phase of the winter campaign was fought without a central defense strategy. The Hungarians suffered a series of defeats, but poor enemy coordination meant none were decisive. There was always at least one front where the Hungarians could regroup and reinforce threatened positions.

Three major crises followed. The first, from December 30 to January 5, included Perczel’s defeat at Mór, Kiss Ernő’s failure at Pancsova, the retreat from Budetin, Mészáros’s loss at Kassa, and the evacuation of the capital. Survival was secured by the January 2 war council’s decisions, the enemy's exhaustion, and Bem’s victories in northern Transylvania.

The second crisis came between January 16 and 22. It began with a political conflict in the Bácska army, continued with the evacuation of the southern front, and was compounded by Bem’s defeat near Nagyszeben and Görgei’s losses around Selmecbánya. However, Perczel and Klapka’s successes along the Tisza River helped balance the situation.

The third and final crisis occurred between January 31 and February 11. Imperial attempts to seize crossings over the Tisza (at Tokaj, Cibakháza, and Szeged) all failed. The siege of Arad was temporarily broken but reestablished by late February. Bem nearly faced catastrophe at Vízakna (February 4) but reversed his fortunes five days later at Piski. Görgei, initially at risk of being surrounded, turned the tables with his breakthrough at Branyiszkó on February 5, forcing Schlik into retreat.

During this campaign, the Hungarians lost three major fortresses—Buda, Lipótvár, and Eszék—but managed to tighten the blockade around Arad by the end of February. The imperial command under Windisch-Grätz underperformed despite having superior resources. In early January, he had every chance to end the war in his favor but lacked boldness. A timely push toward the Tisza could have overwhelmed the divided Hungarian forces.

By late February, both sides attempted to seize the initiative. Although the Hungarians had the advantage, the Battle of Kápolna halted their momentum. Yet afterward, it was Windisch-Grätz who lost the strategic initiative—never to regain it.

== Sources ==
- Babucs, Zoltán (2017), "A sorsdöntőnek vélt kápolnai csata (The Battle of Kápolna, Believed to be decissive)", Felvidék.ma (2021.02.26)
- Babucs, Zoltán (2021), ""A váci nyilatkozat" (The Declaration of Vác)", Magyarságkutató Intézet (5 January 2021) (in Hungarian)
- Bánlaky, József (2001). A magyar nemzet hadtörténelme ("The Military History of the Hungarian Nation). Arcanum Adatbázis Kft.
- Báró Balás, György (1927). Bem József 1794-1850 (Józef Bem 1794-1850) (PDF) (in Hungarian). Budapest: Királyi Magyar Egyetemi Nyomda.
- Bona, Gábor; Csikány, Tamás; Dobszay, Tamás (1996). 1848-1849 A szabadságharc és forradalom története ("1848-1849 The History of the War of Independence and the Revolution") (in Hungarian). Budapest: Videópont. ISBN 963-8218-207.
- Bona, Gábor (2018). Az 1848/49-es szabadságharc tisztikara ("The Officers of the War of Independence of 1848/49) (in Hungarian). Arcanum Adatbázis Kft.
- Bona, Gábor (1999). The Hungarian Revolution and War of Independence, 1848-1849. A Military History. New York: Columbia University Press. p. 606. ISBN 0-88033-433-9.
- Csikány, Tamás (2007), "A háromszéki kisháború 1848 decemberében (The Small War in Háromszék in December 1848)" (PDF), Hadtörténelmi Közlemények, 120. évf. 3. sz (in Hungarian)
- Csikány, Tamás (2004). A magyar honvédség 1848-1989 I. ("The Hungarian Army 1848-1989 I.") (in Hungarian). Budapest: Oktatási Minisztérium. p. 318. ISBN 963-86441-2-5.
- Csikány, Tamás (2008). Hadművészet az 1848-49-es magyar szabadságharcban("The Military Art of the Freedom War of 1848-1849") (in Hungarian). Budapest: Zrínyi Miklós Nemzetvédelmi Egyetem Hadtudományi Kar. p. 200.
- Egyed, Ákos (2004), "Az erdélyi magyarság történetéből 1790–1914 (From the History of the Transylvanian Hungarians 1790-1914)" (PDF), Erdélyi Múzeum Egyesület – Erdélyi Tudományos Füzetek 243, Kolozsvár
- Egyed, Ákos (2010). Erdély 1848–1849 ("Transylvania in 1848-1849") (in Hungarian). Csíkszereda: Pallas-Akadémia Könyvkiadó. p. 616. ISBN 978-973-665-312-4.
- Hajagos, József (2002), "Az 1848–49-es I. magyar hadtest iratai I. Megalakulástól az 1849. január 4-i kassai vereségig (Documents of the First Hungarian Army Corps, 1848–49 I. From its formation to the defeat at Kassa on January 4, 1849)", A Heves Megyei Levéltár forráskiadványai 10. (Eger, 2004) (in Hungarian)
- Hajagos, József (2002), "Az 1848–49-es I. magyar hadtest iratai II. A januári újjászervezés és az első sikerek (Documents of the First Hungarian Army Corps, 1848–49 II. Reorganization in January and the First Successes)", A Heves Megyei Levéltár forráskiadványai 9. (Eger, 2002) (in Hungarian)
- Hermann, Róbert (2001). 1848-1849. A szabadságharc hadtörténete ("1848–1849. The History of the War of Independence) (in Hungarian). Budapest: Korona Kiadó. p. 424. ISBN 9639376213.
- Hermann, Róbert (2004). Az 1848–1849-es szabadságharc nagy csatái ("Great battles of the Hungarian War of Independence of 1848–1849") (in Hungarian). Budapest: Zrínyi. ISBN 963-327-367-6.
- Hermann, Róbert, "Az olmützi oktrojált alkotmány (The Enforced Constitution of Olmütz)", Rubicon (in Hungarian)
- Hermann, Róbert (2009). Magyarország története 14. Forradalom és szabadságharc 1848-1849 ("The history of Hungary 14. The Hungarian Revolution and War of Independence of 1848–1849) (in Hungarian). Budapest: Kossuth Kiadó. p. 112. ISBN 978-963-09-5692-5.
- Hermann, Róbert (2013). A magyar függetlenségi háború [Great Battles 15: The Hungarian Freedom War]. Nagy csaták. 15. (in Hungarian). Budapes t: Duna Könyvklub. ISBN 978-615-5013-997.
- Hermann, Róbert (2011). A magyar függetlenségi háború [Great Battles 16: The Hungarian Freedom War]. Nagy csaták. 16. (in Hungarian). Budapes t: Duna Könyvklub. ISBN 978-615-5129-00-1.
- Horváth, Gábor (2017). "Február 26-27. – A kápolnai csata. Ezen a napon történt (The Battle of Kápolna. 26-27. February 1849. This Day Happened)". Győri Szalon. Archived from the original on April 26, 2025.
- Horváth, Gábor (2017). "December 30. – A móri ütközet. Ezen a napon történt (The Battle of Mór. 30. December 1848. This Day Happened)". Győri Szalon. Archived from the original on February 15, 2025.*
- Kemény, Krisztián (2018), "A második szolnoki ütközet (1849 március 5) (The Second Battle of Szolnok. 5 March 1849)" (PDF), Hadtörténelmi Közlemények, 131. évf. 2. sz. (in Hungarian)
- Olchváry, Ödön (1999). A magyar függetlenségi harc 1848-1849-ben a Délvidéken (in Hungarian). Budapest: Márkus Samu Könyvnyomdája.
- Spira, György (1959). A magyar forradalom 1848–49-ben [The Hungarian Revolution in 1848–1849] (in Hungarian). Budapest: Gondolat Kiadó. p. 676.
- Süli, Attila (2014), "Vaságyúk, rézágyúk: 200 éve született Gábor Áron (Iron cannons, copper cannons: Áron Gábor was born 200 years ago)", Magyar Nemzeti Levéltár (in Hungarian)
- Szentkatolnai Bakk, Endre (1880). Az 1848-49-iki szabadságharcz alatti események Vizaknán (Events in Vízakna during the 1848-49 War of Independence) (PDF) (in Hungarian). Budapest: Hunyadi Mátyás Intézet Nyomdája.
- Tarján M., Tamás, "Bem József győzelmet arat Piskinél (Józef Bem Scores a Victory at Piski)", Rubicon (in Hungarian)
- Tarján M., Tamás, "V. Ferdinánd lemond trónjairól Ferenc József javára (Ferdinand the 5th Renounces to his Trone to Franz Joseph)", Rubicon (in Hungarian)
- Thim, József (1940). A magyarországi 1849-49-iki szerb fölkelés története I (History of the Serb Uprising in Hungary in 1848-49 vol. I) (PDF) (in Hungarian). Budapest: Magyar Történelmi Társulat.
