= Second Battle of Szolnok =

Battle during Hungarian Revolution of 1848

Coordinates: 47°10′08.7″N 20°09′52.0″E

- Part of the Hungarian Revolution of 1848
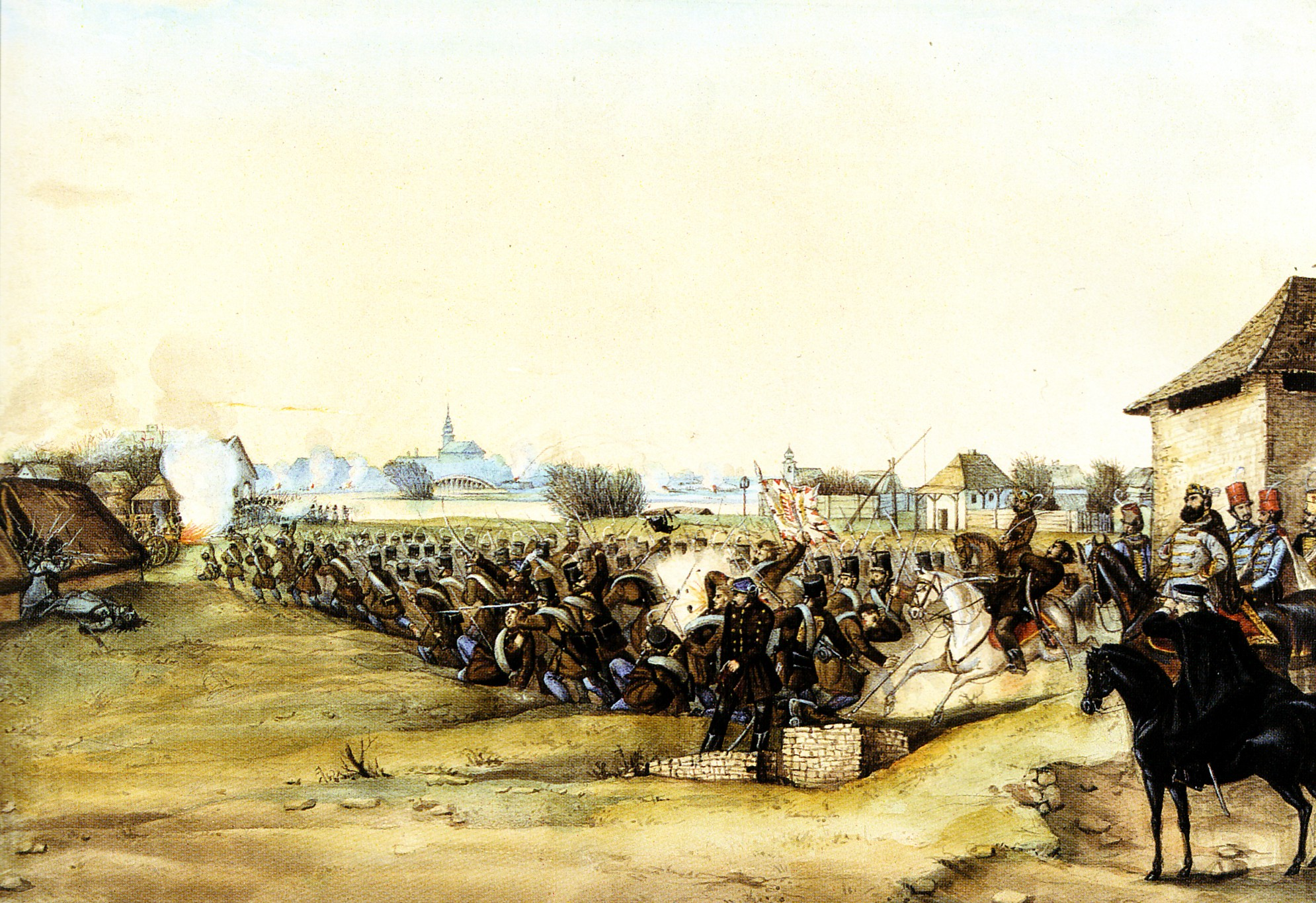
- Second Battle of Szolnok by Mór Than
| Date | 5 March 1849 |
| Location | Szolnok, Szolnok County, Kingdom of Hungary |
| Result | Hungarian victory |

Belligerents
| Hungarian Revolutionary Army; Polish Legion | Austrian Empire |

Commanders and leaders
| János Damjanich; Károly Vécsey | Leopold Karger; Ferenc Ottinger |

Strength
| 14,483 men 35 cannons | 7,233 men 18 cannons |

Casualties and losses
| 300 men | 800–900 men 330 horses 5 cannons 16–17 ammunition wagons |

The Second Battle of Szolnok took place during the Hungarian war of Independence of 1848–1849 on 5 March 1849. It was fought between the two divisions of the revolutionary Hungarian army led by Major-General János Damjanich and Major-General Károly Vécsey against the brigades of the Austrian Empire led by Major General Leopold Edler von Karger and General Ferenc Ottinger. The Hungarians won the battle and drove out the Austrian troops from the city, causing them heavy losses. This victory gave a moral boost to the Hungarians and shook the overconfidence of the Austrian main commander Field Marshal Alfred I, Prince of Windisch-Grätz who reported after the Battle of Kápolna from 26 to 27 February, that he scattered them and destroyed the rebellious hordes, and that he will capture the nest of the rebellion, Debrecen in a few days.

== Background ==
After General Mór Perczel achieved a victory on 22 January 1849 in the First Battle of Szolnok, the Hungarian troops withdrew on 27 January from Szolnok., and the Austrian I. Corps reoccupied it on 28 January. Szolnok was entered by the reinforced Gramont Brigade (about 4,800 men and 12 guns), and almost immediately he began to fortify the town. Together with individuals from the local population, and the surrounding settlements, forced by the Austrians to work, the K.u.K. sappers first restored the railway line and the burnt pile bridge then began to reinforce the bridgehead with ramparts. By the second half of February 1849, the bridge rampart was completed, and on the right bank of the Tisza, several fortified gun emplacements were built, from which the causeway leading to the bridge could be cross-fired. Although the idea of completely surrounding the city with ramparts existed, this was not done due to lack of time. Only a fortified gun emplacement was built on the chapel hill at the northern edge of the suburb of Szentgyörgy (St. John).

The Imperial garrison stationed in the town, in case of an enemy attack, had to be supported by the Austrian troops placed along the Pest-Szolnok railway line, Abony, and Cegléd area, especially the Ottinger cavalry brigade which was in Abony. However, Major General Franz Gramont was of the opinion on 31 January that as long as the bridge at Cibakháza was in Hungarian hands, the Hungarians could cross and attack the garrison from Szolnok from the flank at any time. And since the cavalry led by Major General Ferenc Ottinger could hardly arrive in time, so in the case of a retreat Szolnok's garrison brigade could easily lose its baggage, ammunition, and supplies. On 24 February, the Imperial Brigade led by Ottinger tried to capture the Hungarian bridgehead from Cibakháza, in order to prevent the Hungarians from crossing the river by destroying it. For the operation, he committed 3-3 companies of the 6th and 7th Infantry Regiments, 3 Battalion, 3rd Infantry Regiment, 16th Congreve Rocket Battery, 5th Cavalry Battery, and 1st Twelve Pounder Battery. The Imperial artillery was unable to outgun the Hungarian artillery, which fired accurately from a covered position, and after a while the Imperial artillery run out of ammunition. Ottinger tried to resolve the problem by personally leading his infantry columns against the bridge, but they were broken up by the grapeshots fired by the Hungarian artillery turned back. The Honvéds repulsed the attack brilliantly. Despite this, there were no major changes in the Imperial positions; only that at the end of February Gramont's troops were replaced at Szolnok by Major General Leopold Edler von Karger's brigade (about 4600 men and 15 guns).

By early March, there were increasing signs that a Hungarian attack was imminent. On 3 March, a small attack hit the bridgehead, while a Hungarian squad damaged the railway line between Szolnok and Abony, and there were reports of Hungarian troop concentrations. Nevertheless, the Imperial commanders were apparently confident that the garrison could hold until reinforcements arrived.

According to the decision of the military council of 2 January 1849, the Hungarian troops evacuated the Délvidék (Southern Region of Hungary) in the second half of January, and the two Hungarian corps from there headed north. Major General Károly Vécsey's troops of Bácska left a relatively large force in the Szeged area, so this corps was reduced to a division-sized force. On 9 February 1849 they were already in Szentes, on 12 February they arrived in Törökszentmiklós. In the two weeks that followed, however, this division remained inactive because it had not received any orders. Major-General János Damjanich's army from Bánság arrived in Arad at the end of January, and from there he sent reinforcements to General Józef Bem in Transylvania, so this army corps was also reduced to a division-sized force. His troops left Arad on 4 February for Szentes via Tótkomlós and Orosháza and then stayed between Szentes and Csongrád for two weeks. On 9 February, the Serbs attacked Szeged, and Lajos Kossuth ordered Damjanich to send a brigade to defend the threatened city. This was no longer necessary after the Hungarian victory at Szeged on 11 February. The division was already at Cibakháza on 24 February.

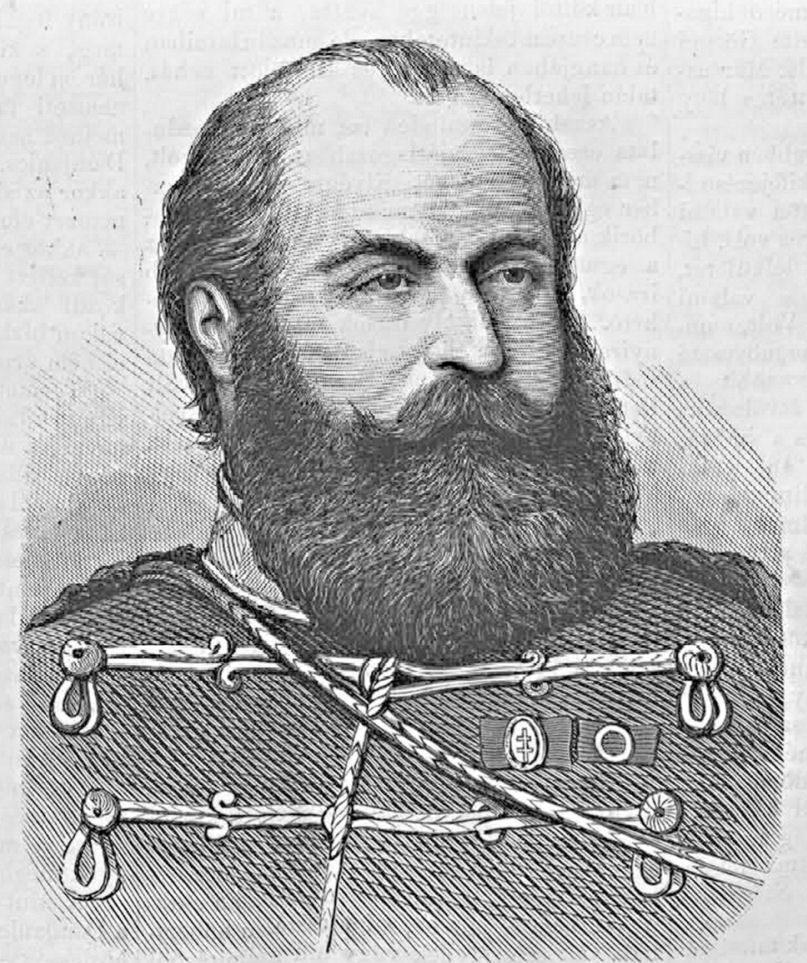
Damjanich János

But the new commander-in-chief, Lieutenant General Henryk Dembiński, probably planned the decisive attack on the Upper Tisza region, on the Eger-Gyöngyös-Hatvan route, so he only intended to defend the Szolnok-Cibakháza area. Therefore, in the first half of February the II Corps led by Major General Mihály Répássy, then from mid-February the 6th (Bácska) Division led by Count Károly Vécsey (about 6400 men and 21 guns) was only tasked with reconnaissance and the defense of the Cibakháza bridgehead, which they successfully accomplished. The situation changed on 25 February, when the vanguard of János Damjanich's 8th (Bánság) Division (about 5600 men and 20 guns) arrived at Cibakháza. Along the Central Tisza, given the importance of local conditions, two smaller army groupings almost arbitrarily stood face to face. On the Hungarian side was Vécsey's (6th) division at Törökszentmiklós, Damjanic's (8th) division with the main force around Cibakháza, and a smaller detachment at Szentes; there was also the Mesterházy detachment at Cibakháza.

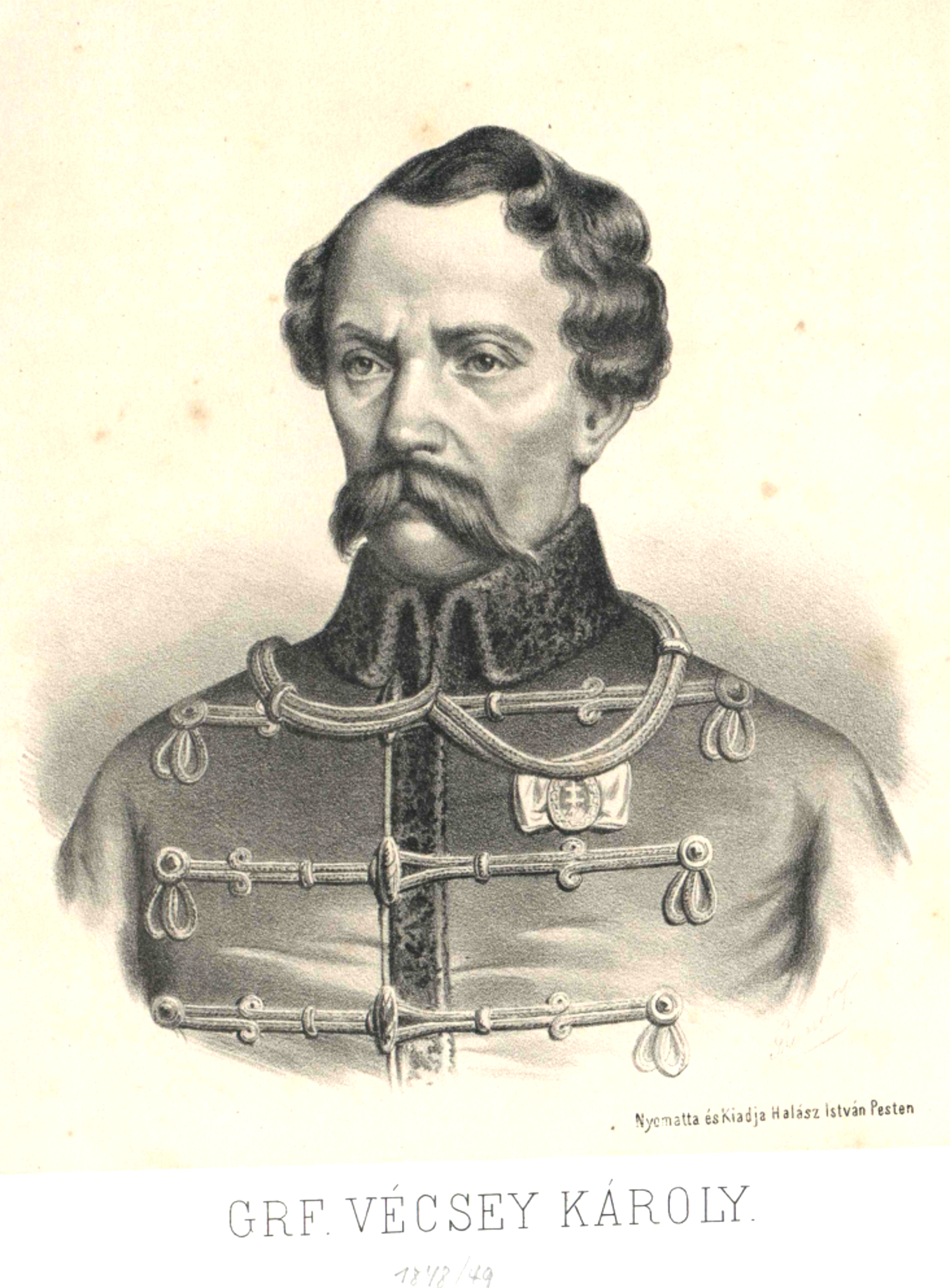
Károly Vécsey

The different units of the Austrian I Corps, which had to defend the Pest-Szolnok line and to keep an eye on the middle Tisza region, were positioned as follows: the Karger Brigade was at Szolnok, Ottinger's cavalry brigade at Abony, 1 company at Nagykőrös; the rest of the corps, together with the Pálffy Brigade, which had just arrived from Mohács on the Danube, was stationed partly at Pest, partly at Cegléd and its surroundings. As by this time Dembiński had already learned that there was a considerable K.u.K. force moving in the direction of the planned main attack, he ordered Damjanich in a letter sent from Eger at 11 a.m. on 26 February to occupy Szolnok starting from Cibakháza and to damage the railway line. He also warned him to secure his left flank and under no circumstances to allow the enemy's large numbers of cavalry to cut his line of retreat to the bridgehead. The bridgehead at Szolnok was the only one in the hands of the imperial troops, so its, at least temporary, capture could have been a major advantage. He also promised Damjanich also the help of Vécsey, to whom he sent a similar letter the same day. The Polish lieutenant-general hoped that this action would force the imperials to redeploy forces further south from the main direction of the planned Hungarian attack before the decisive battle and that this would make it easier to defeat them. But the Battle of Kápolna, which began at half past one in the afternoon on 26 February – two days earlier than Dembiński had expected – thwarted his calculations. As to the reason why Dembiński delayed so long in ordering the operation in Szolnok, historian József Bánlaky thinks that the reason may be that the commander-in-chief did not see the matter as urgent, since it is known that he did not expect the clash of the main forces to take place by the 26th, and he wanted to wait for Damjanich's report on the preparedness of his army units for the operation.

== Prelude ==
After prior consultation, the planned attack finally took place on 3 March. A Hungarian Jäger squad moved forward at dawn from Cibakháza on wagons, damaging the railway line between Szolnok and Abony. However, the attack failed, as the left of the two columns of the main force (about 7000 men and 23 guns), led by Damjanich from Cibakháza and reinforced by Vécsey's troops, got lost in the wilderness and did not arrive at Vezseny, the designated meeting point. So the General was forced to call off the attack. In the meantime, Vécsey's vanguard attacked the Imperial outpost in front of the bridgehead at Szolnok at dawn, but as the main Hungarian forces did not arrive, he finally broke off the battle and retreated to Törökszentmiklós. Damjanich set the date for the next attack for 5 March. Since Dembiński's orders, received on 3 March, had already informed Vécsey that the I Corps under Colonel György Klapka was also on its way to Szolnok, he decided to send additional reinforcements to Damjanich that day. He informed the general already on 3 March through a letter and indicated that the troops he had sent would join the 8th Division in the area of Tiszavárkony. At the same time, he suggested that the raid should take place at 4 a.m., as it was reported that the entire garrison of the K.u.K. garrison was on alert every day between 5 and 9 a.m. Finally, on 4 March, Vécsey sent his sappers to the Vezseny area to prepare the crossing there and informed Damjanich about this. On the same day, he also informed Colonel György Klapka of the attack, which was to begin at half past four in the morning on 5 March, and asked his troops to advance towards Szolnok in support.

On the evening of 4 March, Vécsey sent troops to reinforce Damjanich towards Várkony and Vezseny and ordered the remaining units to be ready to march by 2 a.m. on 5 March. The 6th Division, which departed from Törökszentmiklós in the greatest silence, picked up its vanguards at Szajol, and reached its planned starting position in the fog around 4 a.m. The vanguard of the I Corps, the brigade led by Major Bátori-Sulcz (about 2300–2400 men and 6–8 guns) was hurrying, but the exhausted troops, who had been marching on muddy roads for two days without rest, reached Törökszentmiklós only at dawn on the 5th, around 6 a.m. Even though the commander Bátori-Sulcz, had rushed ahead to inform Vécsey of the expected arrival time of his troops, the brigade still had a good two-hour march to Szolnok in the snowfall. Thus, Vécsey's division with its remaining troops, about 2900–3000 men and 12 guns, waited for the arrival of Damjanich's (and Bátori-Sulcz's) troops.

The plan for the capture of Szolnok was drawn up by Lieutenant-Colonel Kleinheinz. The plan was for Damjanich's division to attack the enemy from the flank, cut off the retreat of the imperial forces towards Cegléd and try to push them in the Zagyva stream. Meanwhile, the Vécsey Division launches the main attack from Szandaszőlős, from the direction of the Tisza bridge, against the bridgehead on opposite bank in Szolnok. According to the plan, Vécsey had to start the attack in order to attract the attention of the Imperial troops and thus enable Damjanich to surround the enemy. At the same time, a detachment consisting of the 28th Honvéd Battalion, 2 hussar companies, and 8 cannons was to be sent to Csongrád to organize and support, after crossing the Tisza, a popular uprising there.

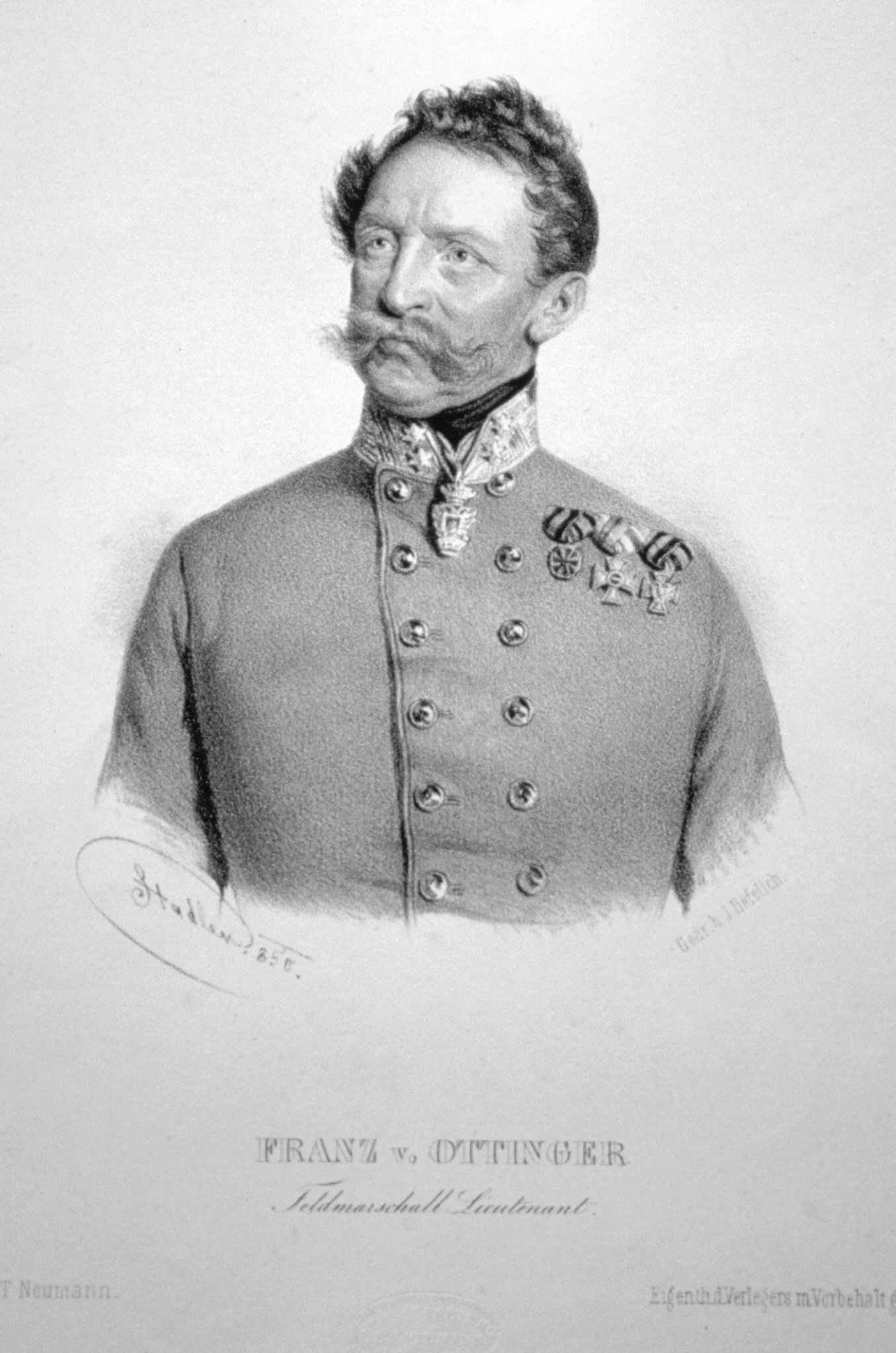
Franz von Ottinger

Damjanich at Cibakháza ordered to prepare for the march on 4 March at 4 p.m., and his troops began the crossing to the right bank's bridgehead that evening, half an hour after the last patrol of the imperials had left the area. After this was completed, the division – this time in a single column – marched along the right bank of the Tisza towards Szolnok; the Polish Uhlans formed the vanguard. To defend the bridgehead, Mesterházy's volunteer and national guard troops were left behind with the Hajdú half-battery. The column advanced in silence at night, without once encountering the Imperial outposts, to Várkony, where it camped and rested, and waited for the Knezić Brigade, which crossed the Tisza at Várkony and Vezseny on ferries and boats. After their arrival, the strength of the reinforced 8th Division increased to about 9,000 men and 26 guns. At the end of the rest, the column continued northwards, and a company of the 2nd Hussar Regiment (probably the 1st Colonel) company was detached to damage the railway again between Szolnok and Abony. However, this operation failed. After a while the commander of the unit, Captain Count Alexander Wartensleben, left the company behind, claiming that he want to reconnoiter, led a patrol of 8 hussars towards Abony, where he left his men and went to the Austrian outposts and surrendered. Therefore, the company returned, without finishing its mission, to the column which approached the town of Szolnok in the foggy dawn around 6 a.m., an hour and a half later than the previously agreed attack time (half past 4). Wartensleben's purpose in giving himself up was of course to inform General Ferenc Ottinger of the Hungarian attack, but by this time (8 o'clock) Karger had already informed him of it by sending an envoy with locomotive on the railroad.

The division then moved into battle formation, and here too the waiting began. The two Hungarian commanders were probably waiting for each other, Damjanich for Vécsey to attack the bridgehead and Vécsey for Damjanich to launch the main attack.

In the meantime, however, the Croatian Ban's Hussar platoon (fighting on the Austrian side), which was probably securing the Szentjános suburb south of the Szolnok railway line, became suspicious of the noise coming from the south-southwest, and the Imperial Hussar patrol sent out to reconnoiter, in the heavy fog almost immediately ran into the 3rd Battalion of the 19th Regiment of the Hungarian Infantry on the Hungarian right flank, who fired at them. The Royal Cavalry quickly retreated, then, having evacuated the suburb, withdrew to the southwestern edge of Szolnok; their commander immediately reported the incident to Major-General Karger, who alerted the garrison at half past 6. The three cannon shots, which sounded the alarm, were fired by the 5th half Infantry battery at the Tisza Bridge.

Karger was informed of the enemy's concentration of troops near Cibakháza, and of their foreseeable intention to attack, by the cavalry company sent to Nagykőrös quite early, on 3 March. This makes it hard to understand why the Austrian general did not take the necessary precautionary measures, furthermore, why he neglected the reconnoitering after receiving the information about the probability of an imminent Hungarian attack. As a result of Karger's negligence the Hungarian attack literally took him by surprise.

Karger, who had a quick breakfast, and Brigade Staff Officer Captain Friedrich Semetkowski probably did not initially consider the situation too serious.

=== Opposing forces ===
The Hungarian army

73,5 infantry companies, 18,5 cavalry companies, 47(49) cannons.
Total: 14,483 soldiers

Detailed order of battle of the Hungarian army

| Division | Brigade | Unit | Leader | Infantry company | Cavalry company | Horse | Cannon | Number |
|---|---|---|---|---|---|---|---|---|
6th Division; Major General Károly Vécsey (Note: The battle order for this division is from 23 February 1849, when it was stationing at Törökszentmiklós)
| 6th Division; Major General Károly Vécsey | Right wing brigade Colonel János Lenkey | 3rd battalion of the 19. (Schwarzenberg) line infantry regiment | Major Károly Leiningen-Westerburg | 6 | – | – | – | 854 |
| 6th Division; Major General Károly Vécsey | Right wing brigade Colonel János Lenkey | 6th Honvéd Battalion | Lieutenant Colonel Antal Dipold | 6 | – | – | – | 776 |
| 6th Division; Major General Károly Vécsey | Right wing brigade Colonel János Lenkey | Szeged sappers | Captain Lajos Porták | 1 | – | – | – | 111 |
| 6th Division; Major General Károly Vécsey | Right wing brigade Colonel János Lenkey | Selmec Jäger Squad | Captain Isidor Baudis | 0,5 | – | – | – | 76 |
| 6th Division; Major General Károly Vécsey | Right wing brigade Colonel János Lenkey | 3rd (Ferdinand) Hussar Regiment's Lieutenant Colonel's Squadron | Lieutenant Colonel János Puchly | – | 2 | 284 | – | 284 |
| 6th Division; Major General Károly Vécsey | Right wing brigade Colonel János Lenkey | 1st Cavalry Battery | Lieutenant Vince Schiedebaum | – | – | 116 | 6 | 152 |
| 6th Division; Major General Károly Vécsey | Right wing brigade Colonel János Lenkey | Brigade total | | 13,5 | 2 | 400 | 6 | 2253 |
| 6th Division; Major General Károly Vécsey | Center brigade Colonel József Kászonyi | 3rd battalion of the 52. (Franz Karl) line infantry regiment | Major Sándor Bárány | 6 | – | – | – | 854 |
| 6th Division; Major General Károly Vécsey | Center brigade Colonel József Kászonyi | 65th Honvéd Battalion | Major Szaniszló Kökényesi | 6 | – | – | – | 1284 |
| 6th Division; Major General Károly Vécsey | Center brigade Colonel József Kászonyi | 3rd (Ferdinand) Hussar Regiment's 2nd Major's Squadron | Major János Krain | – | 2 | 294 | – | 294 |
| 6th Division; Major General Károly Vécsey | Center brigade Colonel József Kászonyi | Hajdú Volunteer Mounted National Guard Squadron | Major Lajos Komlóssy | – | 2 | 250 | – | 259 |
| 6th Division; Major General Károly Vécsey | Center brigade Colonel József Kászonyi | 5th six-pounder Infantry Battery | Lieutenant János Lechner | – | – | 74 | 6 | 118 |
| 6th Division; Major General Károly Vécsey | Center brigade Colonel József Kászonyi | Half six-pounder Infantry Battery | Lieutenant János Hajdú | – | – | 28 | 3 | 58 |
| 6th Division; Major General Károly Vécsey | Center brigade Colonel József Kászonyi | Brigade total | | 12 | 4 | 646 | 9 | 2867 |
| 6th Division; Major General Károly Vécsey | Left wing brigade Lieutenant Colonel Károly Knezić | 3rd battalion of the 34. (Prince of Prussia) line infantry regiment | Captain Piotr Podoski | 4 | – | – | – | 780 |
| 6th Division; Major General Károly Vécsey | Left wing brigade Lieutenant Colonel Károly Knezić | 3rd (Ferdinand) Hussar Regiment's 1st Major's Squadron | Major András Földváry | – | 2 | 274 | – | 274 |
| 6th Division; Major General Károly Vécsey | Left wing brigade Lieutenant Colonel Károly Knezić | 1st (Imperial) Hussar Regiment | Major Lajos Komlóssy | – | 0,5 | 54 | – | 54 |
| 6th Division; Major General Károly Vécsey | Left wing brigade Lieutenant Colonel Károly Knezić | 3rd Cavalry Battery | Lieutenant Josef Knopp | – | – | 121 | 6 | 147 |
| 6th Division; Major General Károly Vécsey | Left wing brigade Lieutenant Colonel Károly Knezić | Brigade total | | 4 | 2,5 | 449 | 6 | 1255 |
| 6th Division; Major General Károly Vécsey | Division total | | | 29,5 | 8,5 | 1495 | 21 | 6375 |
8th Division; Major General János Damjanich (Note: The battle order for this division is from 25 February 1849, when it was stationing at Cibakháza)
| 8th Division; Major General János Damjanich | Right wing brigade Lieutenant Colonel József Wysocki | 1st battalion of the Polish Legion | Captain Ignacy Czernik | 2 | – | – | – | ~250 |
| 8th Division; Major General János Damjanich | Right wing brigade Lieutenant Colonel József Wysocki | 1st company of the 1st Uhlan Regiment of the Polish Legion | Captain Władysław Poniński | – | 1 | ~120 | – | ~120 |
| 8th Division; Major General János Damjanich | Right wing brigade Lieutenant Colonel József Wysocki | 11th six-pounder half infantry battery | Captain István Markó | – | – | ~50 | 4 | ~80 |
| 8th Division; Major General János Damjanich | Right wing brigade Lieutenant Colonel József Wysocki | Brigade total | | 2 | 1 | ~170 | 4 | ~450 |
| 8th Division; Major General János Damjanich | Center brigade Colonel József Nagysándor | 3rd battalion of the 60. (Wasa) line infantry regiment | Major Ede Czillich | 6 | – | – | – | ~920 |
| 8th Division; Major General János Damjanich | Center brigade Colonel József Nagysándor | 3rd Honvéd Battalion | Major János Bobich | 6 | – | – | – | ~860 |
| 8th Division; Major General János Damjanich | Center brigade Colonel József Nagysándor | 2nd (Hannover) Hussar Regiment | Colonel Ágoston Pikéty | – | 6 | ~660 | – | ~660 |
| 8th Division; Major General János Damjanich | Center brigade Colonel József Nagysándor | 4th six-pounder infantry battery | Captain Tomas Phillipowski | – | – | ~100 | 8 | ~150 |
| 8th Division; Major General János Damjanich | Center brigade Colonel József Nagysándor | Brigade total | | 12 | 6 | ~760 | 8 | ~2590 |
| 8th Division; Major General János Damjanich | Left wing (rearguard) brigade Lieutenant Colonel Pál Kiss | 9th Honvéd Battalion | Major Ferenc Elek | 6 | – | – | – | ~1060 |
| 8th Division; Major General János Damjanich | Left wing (rearguard) brigade Lieutenant Colonel Pál Kiss | 28th Honvéd Battalion | Captain Dénes Huszóczy | 6 | – | – | – | ~1100 |
| 8th Division; Major General János Damjanich | Left wing (rearguard) brigade Lieutenant Colonel Pál Kiss | 2nd (Hannover) Hussar Regiment's 2nd Major's (?) Squadron | Major Ernst Hügel | – | 2 | ~220 | – | ~220 |
| 8th Division; Major General János Damjanich | Left wing (rearguard) brigade Lieutenant Colonel Pál Kiss | 8th cavalry battery | Captain Wenzel Freudenreich | – | – | ~150 | 8 | ~160 |
| 8th Division; Major General János Damjanich | Left wing (rearguard) brigade Lieutenant Colonel Pál Kiss | Brigade total | | 12 | 2 | ~370 | 8 | ~2540 |
| 8th Division; Major General János Damjanich | Division total | | | 26 | 9 | ~1300 | 20 | ~5580 |
1st Corps, 2nd (Bułharin) Division
| 1st Corps, 2nd (Bułharin) Division | Báthori-Sulcz brigade Major Bódog Bátori-Sulcz (Note: The battle order for this division is from 22 February 1849, when it was stationing at Miskolc) | 17th honvéd battalion | Captain Gusztáv Kuppis | 6 | – | 15 | – | 772 |
| 1st Corps, 2nd (Bułharin) Division | Báthori-Sulcz brigade Major Bódog Bátori-Sulcz | 19th honvéd battalion | Major János Nyeregjártó | 6 | – | – | – | 616 |
| 1st Corps, 2nd (Bułharin) Division | Báthori-Sulcz brigade Major Bódog Bátori-Sulcz | 52nd honvéd battalion | Major Mihály Szász | 6 | – | – | – | 974 |
| 1st Corps, 2nd (Bułharin) Division | Báthori-Sulcz brigade Major Bódog Bátori-Sulcz | 9th (reserve) company of the 3rd (Ferdinand) Hussar Regiment | Junior Captain Lajos Belányi | – | 0,5 | 51 | – | 50 |
| 1st Corps, 2nd (Bułharin) Division | Báthori-Sulcz brigade Major Bódog Bátori-Sulcz | 9th (reserve) company of the 6th (Württemberg) Hussar Regiment | First Lieutenant Károly Csinálósy | – | 0,5 | 55 | – | 57 |
| 1st Corps, 2nd (Bułharin) Division | Báthori-Sulcz brigade Major Bódog Bátori-Sulcz | 3rd three-pounder battery | Lieutenant Józef Kleczyński and Lieutenant János Vidics | – | – | 71 | 6(8) | 59 |
| 1st Corps, 2nd (Bułharin) Division | Brigade total | | | 18 | 1 | 192 | 6(8) | 2528 |
| Grand total | | | | 73,5 | 18,5 | ~2987 | 47(49) | 14,483 |

The Austrian army

The Hartlieb division had in total 48 infantry companies, 21 cavalry companies, 48 cannons.
Total: 10,755 soldiers. (Note: The battle order for this division is from the end of February 1849.) But in the ensuing battle will only participate only 24 infantry companies, 23 cavalry companies, 3039 horses,
in total 7233 soldiers and 18 cannons.

Detailed order of battle of the Austrian army

| Brigade | Unit | Leader | Infantry company | Cavalry company | Horse | Cannon | Number |
|---|---|---|---|---|---|---|---|
| Karger brigade Major General Leopold Karger | 3rd battalion of the 3rd (Karl) line infantry regiment | Lieutenant Colonel Adolph Schön | 6 | – | 31 | – | 1273 |
| Karger brigade Major General Leopold Karger | 2nd battalion of the 7th (Brod) border guard infantry regiment | Major Ranko Wittoss | 6 | – | 42 | – | 1040 |
| Karger brigade Major General Leopold Karger | 3rd battalion of the 11th (the Ban's 2nd]) border guard infantry regiment | Major Ranko Wittoss | 4 | – | 20 | – | 590 |
| Karger brigade Major General Leopold Karger | 5th Kaiserjäger battalion (1st and 2nd companies) | Captain Josef Schnorbusch | 2 | – | 5 | – | 340 |
| Karger brigade Major General Leopold Karger | Lieutenant Colonel's and Major's Squadrons of the 3rd (Imperial) Dragoon regiment | Lieutenant Colonel Josef Regelsberg | – | 4 | 420 | – | 420 |
| Karger brigade Major General Leopold Karger | Colonel's Squadron and Lieutenant Colonel's Company of the Ban's (Banderial) Hussar regiment | Colonel Otto Sermage | – | 3 | 318 | – | 321 |
| Karger brigade Major General Leopold Karger | 5th six-pounder Infantry Battery | First Lieutenant Ignaz Schrinner | – | – | 85 | 6 | 118 |
| Karger brigade Major General Leopold Karger | 1st Cavalry Battery | First Lieutenant Arthur Bylandt-Rheidt | – | – | 120 | 6 | 117 |
| Karger brigade Major General Leopold Karger | 1st twelve-pounder Half Battery | Second Lieutenant Jacob Bronn | – | – | 45 | 3 | 62 |
| Karger brigade Major General Leopold Karger | Ammunition reserve of the division | First Lieutenant Vincenz Petit | – | – | 34 | – | 33 |
| Karger brigade Major General Leopold Karger | 7th Sapper Company | Captain Eduard Ghilain | 1 | – | 5 | – | 170 |
| Karger brigade Major General Leopold Karger | 16th Half Sapper Company | Lieutenant Josef Thym | 0,5 | – | – | – | 57 |
| Karger brigade Major General Leopold Karger | Aidman squad | Lieutenant Josef Thym | 0,5 | – | – | – | 41 |
| Karger brigade Major General Leopold Karger | Brigade total | | 20 | 7 | 1125 | 15 | 4582 |
| Ottinger brigade Major General Ferenc Ottinger | 6th (Wallmoden) Cuirassier regiment | Colonel József Fejérváry | – | 6 | 719 | – | 719 |
| Ottinger brigade Major General Ferenc Ottinger | 7th (Hardegg) Cuirassier regiment | Colonel Franz Sedelmayer | – | 6 | 589 | – | 592 |
| Ottinger brigade Major General Ferenc Ottinger | 3rd battalion (17th–18th companies) of the 11th (the Ban's 2nd]) border guard infantry regiment | – | 2 | – | 10 | – | 295 |
| Ottinger brigade Major General Ferenc Ottinger | 5th Cavalry Battery | First Lieutenant Carl Loschau | – | – | 134 | 6 | 129 |
| Ottinger brigade Major General Ferenc Ottinger | 1st twelve-pounder Half Battery | Lieutenant Budena | – | – | 46 | 3 | 62 |
| Ottinger brigade Major General Ferenc Ottinger | Brigade total | | 2 | 12 | 1498 | 9 | 1797 |
| Gramont brigade Major General Franz Gramont | 3rd battalion of the 1st (Lika) border guard infantry regiment | Lieutenant Colonel Budislaus Budisavliević | 6 | – | 16 | – | 946 |
| Gramont brigade Major General Franz Gramont | 2nd battalion of the 8ht (Gradiska) border guard infantry regiment | Major Franz Ugybinacz | 6 | – | 19 | – | 991 |
| Gramont brigade Major General Franz Gramont | 6th six-pounder Infantry Battery | First Lieutenant Michael Lonchar | – | – | 81 | 6 | 127 |
| Gramont brigade Major General Franz Gramont | Brigade total | | 12 | – | 116 | 6 | 2064 |
| Neustaedter brigade Major General Josef Neustaedter | 1st battalion of the 2nd (Otočac) border guard infantry regiment | Captain Adam Wukelich | 6 | – | 40 | – | 786 |
| Neustaedter brigade Major General Josef Neustaedter | 3rd battalion (15th and 16th companies) of the 10th (Ban's 1st) border guard infantry regiment | Captain Conrad Bennich | 2 | – | – | – | 295 |
| Neustaedter brigade Major General Josef Neustaedter | Bittermann Grenadier Battalion | Major Johann Bittermann | 6 | – | 31 | – | 588 |
| Neustaedter brigade Major General Josef Neustaedter | Major's Squadron of the Ban's (Banderial) Hussar regiment | Captain Ladislaus Gyurković | – | 2 | 150 | – | 160 |
| Neustaedter brigade Major General Josef Neustaedter | 1st six-pounder Infantry Battery | First Lieutenant Johann Klee | – | – | 77 | 6 | 116 |
| Neustaedter brigade Major General Josef Neustaedter | Brigade total | | 14 | 2 | 298 | 6 | 1945 |
| Artillery reserve of the corps Captain Joshann Mühlstein | 2ndt twelve-pounder Battery | First Lieutenant Ferdinand Czillinger | – | – | 91 | 6 | 124 |
| Artillery reserve of the corps Captain Joshann Mühlstein | 16th Congreve rocket Battery | First Lieutenant Johann Brandstädter | – | – | 84 | 6 | 93 |
| Artillery reserve of the corps Captain Joshann Mühlstein | Ammunition reserve of the corps | Captain Josef Gebauer | – | – | 179 | – | 150 |
| Artillery reserve of the corps Captain Joshann Mühlstein | Total | | – | – | 354 | 12 | 367 |
| Division total | | | 48 | 21 | 3391 | 48 | 10,755 |

=== The battle orders of the two armies ===
At this time Szolnok was adequately secured by the bridgehead on the left bank of the Tisza, from which the road leading to it, which was cut by a marshy tributary leading between the meanders of the Tisza could be easily observed, but there was a greater threat from the south, from the direction of Cibakháza, where the bridge over the Tisza, which the Austrians, in the battle of Cibakháza, failed to destroy, was in Hungarian hands.

The city was secured from the north, east, and south by the Tisza, the Zagyva, and the well-built bridgehead and gun emplacements; while from the southwest and west, although the planned entrenchments were still only on the drawing board, the defense was not completely hopeless. On the Szentjános chapel hill near the Tisza, an enclosed gun emplacement for a half battery had been built, while the railway station, the cemetery, and the railway embankment lying west to it, were very suitable for defense. The town itself was surrounded to the west by a wet, marshy area – the former so-called "Tófenék" (Lake bottom) and its watercourses – and the densely built-up areas were surrounded by a wide and deep inland drainage ditch formed from the former moats stretching from the Tisza to the Zagyva, with only two large stone bridges (and probably several smaller temporary passages) leading through it. That is why the Karger apparently thought of defending the city first: although he regrouped most of his troops to the southwest, he still had significant units in the city. The imperial main forces, however, did not build their defences on the aforementioned defendable places (the railway station, the cemetery, and the railway embankment) but were positioned south of the railway, on the northern, higher edge of a flatter area, with their left flank leaning on the Tisza. According to Austrian sources, the deployment of the troops took a long time, and then the brigade was positioned at the angle formed by the railway embankment and the Tisza; the bridgehead was occupied by one and a half infantry company and 4 cannons, and the railway station by four companies; at the exit of the bridge on the right bank of the Tisza, 1 1/2 companies of sappers were stationed, and finally, the extreme right flank was formed by 6 companies of cavalry, stationed near the railway station; the remainder of the troops defended the town itself. The detailed set-up of the defense troops is as follows.

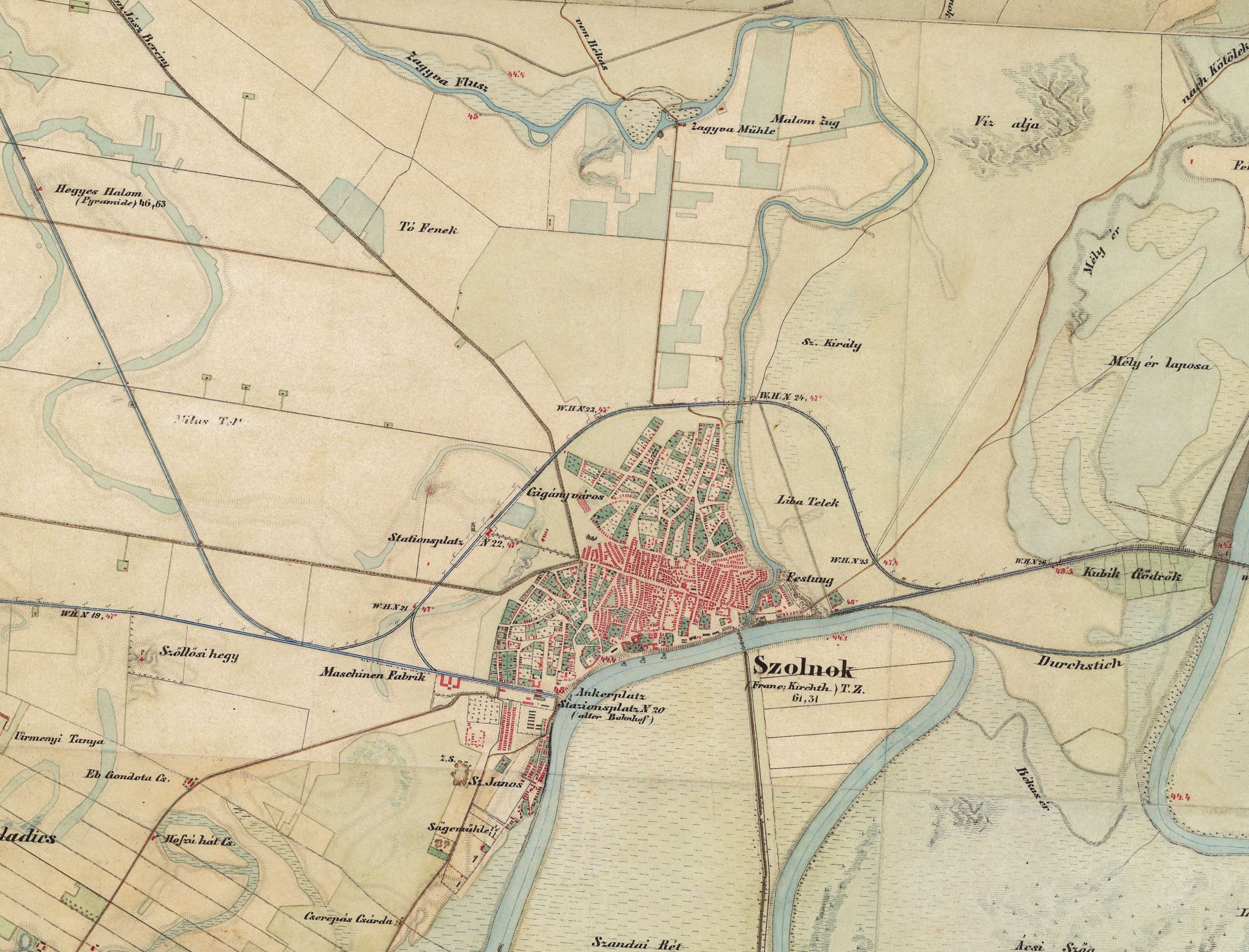
Map of Szolnok on the middle of the 19th century

On Szolnok's southeastern exit, along the right bank of the Tisza, Karger's troops were deployed as it follows. On the left, the 3rd Battalion of the 3rd Infantry Regiment (13–16th Companies) and the 1st squadron of the 5th Kaiserjäger Battalion (the 1st company, and half of the 2nd company), in the center was the 2nd battalion of the 7th Border Guard Infantry Regiment (the 7th–8th and the 11th–12th companies) and the 3rd battalion of the 11th Border Guard Infantry Regiment (13th–16th companies; 3.5 companies in total), while the 3rd Dragoon Regiment (Major's Squadron and one company of the Lieutenant-Colonel's Squadron) was in the right flank in the first line and the Ban's Hussars (Colonel's Squadron) in the second line. In front of the left wing, in the ditch of the St. John's Chapel Hill, the 1st twelve-pounder half-battery (2 guns), and in the center the 5th six-pounder infantry half-battery (3 guns) and the 1st six-pounder cavalry battery (6 guns) were positioned. The infantry deployed in company columns (formed by half squadrons) secured by skirmisher lines, while the cavalry formed up in squadrons, one behind the other. The bridgehead was defended by 3 platoons of the 18th Company of the 3rd Infantry Regiment and 2 platoons of the 2nd Company of the 5th Kaiserjäger Battalion, plus the other half of the 5th Six Pounder Infantry Battery (3 guns). The gun emplacement in the fort probably contained a 12-pounder gun, and the dismantled bridge over the Zagyva River, which was leading to the eastern bank, was secured by the 4th Platoon of the 18th Company. At the northern bridgehead of the Tisza bridge stood the 7th and half of the 16th company of the K.u.K. sappers. The entrances to the town at the bank of the Tisza were probably covered by a platoon of the 1st company of the Lieutenant-Colonel's Squadron of the Ban's Hussar Regiment, and along the Zagyva, at another dismantled bridge was a platoon of the Lieutenant-Colonel's Squadron of Dragoons. The other entrances to the city and the bridges of the drainage ditch were probably defended by the rest of the infantry (2.5 companies of the 7th and 11th Border Guard Infantry Regiments), while the 17th Company of the 3rd Infantry Regiment guarded the ammunition and baggage. 3 platoons of the other company of the Lieutenant Colonel's Squadron of the Dragoons (and probably 3 platoons of the 1st company of the Lieutenant Colonel’ Squadron of the Ban's Hussars) remained in the center of the town as a standby reserve. In any case, the mobilization went smoothly: within a quarter of an hour, or at most a half an hour after the alarm was sounded, all units were in their designated positions.

The Hungarian troops, deployed about 1500 paces from the railway line, on the higher southern edge of the flatter area mentioned above, were deployed as follows: the right wing and the rights side of the center were formed by the reinforced and reorganized brigade led by Lieutenant Colonel Józef Wysocki, while the left side of the center and the left wing was formed by the brigade led by Colonel József Nagysándor. In the first line, on the right flank, along the Tisza, was the 3rd Battalion of the 19th Infantry Regiment, in the center the 3rd Honvéd Battalion, the 1st Battalion of the Polish Legion, the 9th Honvéd Battalion and the Jägers (2 companies), while in the second line was the 3rd Battalion of the 60th Infantry Regiment, the 28th Honvéd Battalion and a half sapper company. On the left flank was the 2nd Hussar Regiment, with the 1st Uhlan Squadron of the Polish Legion in front of it as a vanguard. In front of the right wing was probably the 11th six-pounder half infantry battery (4 guns), in the center the 4th six-pounder infantry battery (8 guns), while on the left wing, the 8th six-pounder cavalry battery (8 guns) and half of the 1st six-pounder cavalry battery (3 guns) were positioned. The reserve brigade led by Lieutenant Colonel Károly Knezić (the 3rd Battalion of the 34th Infantry Regiment, the 65th Honvéd Battalion, the 2nd Major's Squadron of the 3rd Hussars Regiment, the other half of the 1st Six Pounder Cavalry Battery (3 guns) and the other half of the sapper company led by Captain Balázs Dullesko) was behind the center and the right flank. The infantry was deployed in squadron columns and the cavalry in squadrons. In the meantime, around 7 o'clock, Vécsey's troops also advanced to the bridgehead, then took up their positions. The front line was formed by the 6th Honvéd Battalion and the 3rd Battalion of the 52nd Infantry Regiment, the two wings by the Lieutenant-Colonel and 1st Major's squadron of the 3rd Hussars Regiment. The 5th Six Pounder Infantry Battery (6 guns) was probably deployed in front of them. The reserve consisted of the 3rd Cavalry Battery (6 guns), the Hajdú Volunteer Cavalry Squadron, and the Pották sapper company from Szeged.

== Battle ==
=== The Hungarian attack ===
Damjanich, who stood probably at the meeting point of the left wing and the center, although he had a great desire to attack with his troops, still waited to give the order, since Vécsey still had not started the attack against the bridgehead, as it was agreed in the battle plan. His uncertainty may have been increased by the fact that this was the first time he was leading a corps-sized force into an open battle, while his troops were to engage for the first time the regular troops of the Habsburg imperial army. Until then they fought only against the Serbian insurgents from southern Hungary. Meanwhile, the fog had almost completely lifted, and Karger, who was at the first line of the imperial forces, saw only now the overwhelming force he was facing. Therefore, at about 7:30, he sent his own aide-de-camp to Ottinger in Abony on the train kept on standby, and probably at that time he ordered the evacuation of the town. Damjanich immediately understood the significance of the departure of the train and gave the order of firing to the artillery, which now began the battle. On the other hand, he knew that the reinforcements sent by Ottinger would not arrive for another 3–4 hours, and until then the fate of the Hungarian attack was likely to be decided anyway, but still, this encouraged him, even more, to launch the attack as quickly as possible. In the artillery duel that began, the Imperial artillery was at a disadvantage from the start against its twice superior opponent, not only because of its numerical superiority but also because the Hungarian artillery fired very quickly and accurate. Although some of their shells and shrapnel exploded too high, the Hungarian artillerymen shot with the solid cannonballs very effectively against the artillery and the infantry deployed behind it. Within a short time, the 1st Cavalry Battery of the Imperial Army lost 5 horses, the 5th Infantry half Battery lost 6 horses, as well as several guns and cannoneers were hit. However, the most serious situation was on the Imperial right flank, where there was no battery for covering, so the Hungarian cavalry artillery could fire almost unhindered at the opposing Austrian cavalry. Karger, sensing a problem, had earlier tried to help by bringing the seven-pounder howitzer of the half infantry battery from the bridgehead and then sending the dragoon squadron from the standby reserve to the right flank; but these did not improve the situation very much. The weakness of the enemy flank was noticed also by Damjanich, as well as the fact that the longer Hungarian front due to its numerical superiority, offered an opportunity to bypass the imperial order of battle. He, therefore, sent a cavalry column and some cavalry artillery to the flank of the Imperial Cavalry, which, after arriving on the spot, brought the Dragoons and the Ban's Hussars under a flanking fire. The imperial cavalry, caught in the crossfire, could not stay in place for long: so, under cover of a company and the fire of the howitzer, it retreated to the other side of the railway embankment.

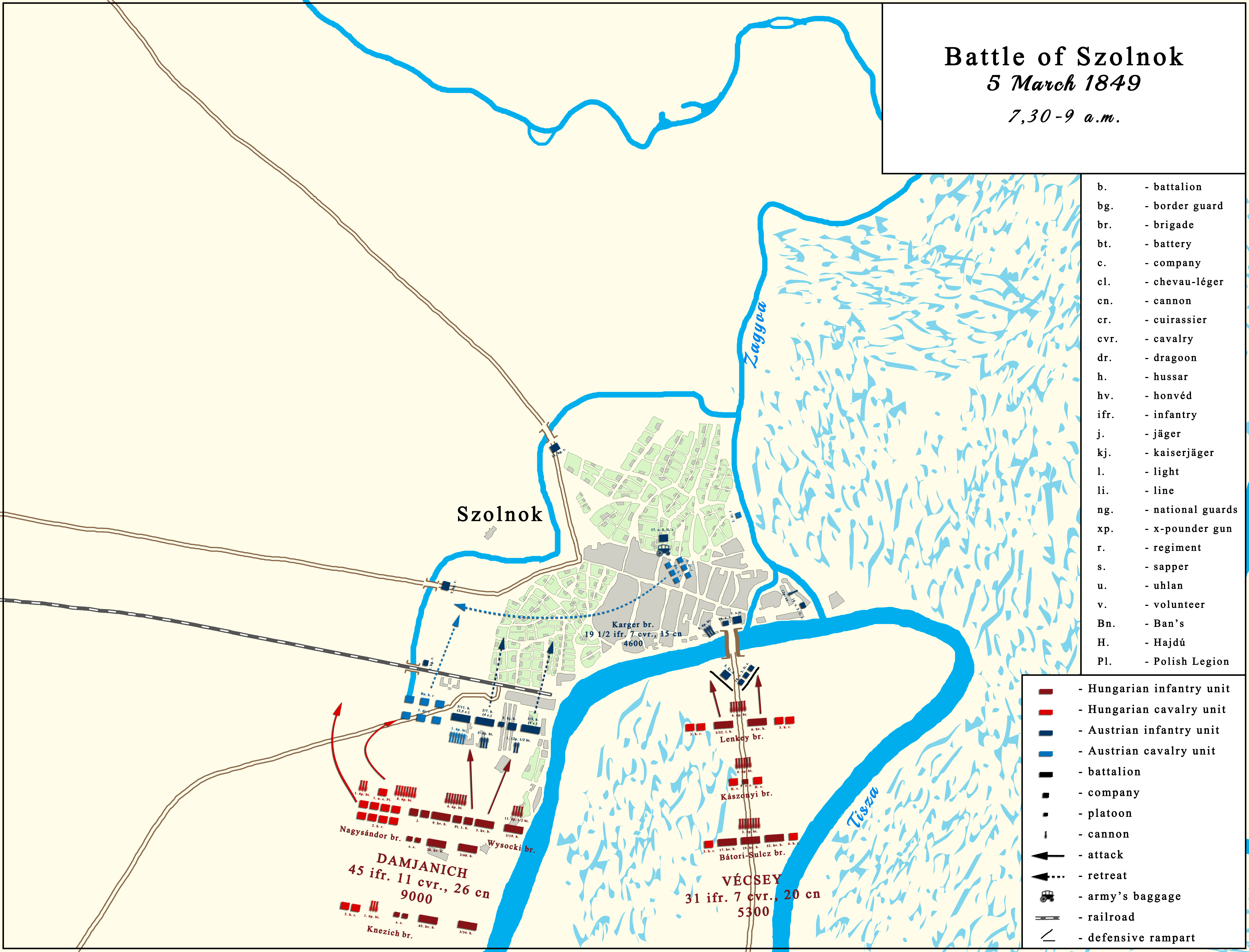
Second Battle of Szolnok (5 March 1849). Situation between 7.30 – 9 a.m

At about the same time as the opening of the artillery fire, Damjanich also ordered the advance of the infantry of the centre and the right flank. Two platoons of each column formed skirmisher lines, and then the battalions, led by Lieutenant-Colonel Wysocki, moved forward, descending into the flatter ground. On the right flank, probably the squadron from the edge of the 3rd Battalion of the 19th Infantry Regiment turned east and occupied the Szentjános (St. John) suburb without resistance, then advanced along the river bank towards the north. The Imperial Artillery tried to break the attack: the batteries fired at all the battalions marching in the front line. The commander of the advancing 3rd Honvéd Battalion (wearing as a distinctive sign of their extraordinary courage white feathers on their hats, thus called the "White Feathered Battalion") advancing in the front, seeing that the Austrian artillery is shooting at them, ordered, "pull aside". But the drummer of the battalion, who, before the battle lined up twice at the morning brandy distribution, and because of this his courage was aroused, shouted back to his commander, I do not retreat, I sound the attack; whereupon the battalion advanced with leveled bayonets. Therefore, he attracted the attention of both batteries of the Imperial Center and lost 52 men in the crossfire. Behind the skirmish lines, the 9th Honvéd Battalion, the 1st Polish Battalion, and the 3/19rd Battalion were also hit (the latter losing 15 men). In the attack, the Hungarian battalions tried to compete with each other. The attacking battalions hit hard by the enemy artillery, regrouped, then made minor direction changes, advancing under the cover of certain relief elevations, but their advance did not stop. In the meantime, the squadron from the edge of the 3/19rd Battalion led by Captain Pál Horváth, which was moving on the bank of the Tisza hidden from the eyes of the enemy, tried to storm the Austrian 12-pound half-battery from the Szentjános Chapel Hill, which was shooting at their advancing battalion, but they were attacked by the 16th Company of the 3rd imperial Infantry Regiment from here, together with half of the 1st Company of the 5th Kaiserjäger Battalion sent to help, thus the Austrians repulsed the bayonet charge, and bought time to withdraw the half-battery. However, the front line of the Imperial Battalion became so stretched that the unit's commander Lieutenant Colonel Adolph Schön feared that the enemy column estimated to be two battalions strong (4 companies of the 3/19 Battalion led by Major Károly Leiningen-Westerburg and probably the 3/60 Battalion behind him), would break through their defenses. But then one of Karger's adjutants arrived with orders for the troops to retreat back into the town and hold it until the bridgehead could be evacuated. Lieutenant-Colonel Schön, therefore, retreated with his own battalion and the Kaiserjägers under cover of the skirmish lines into the town.

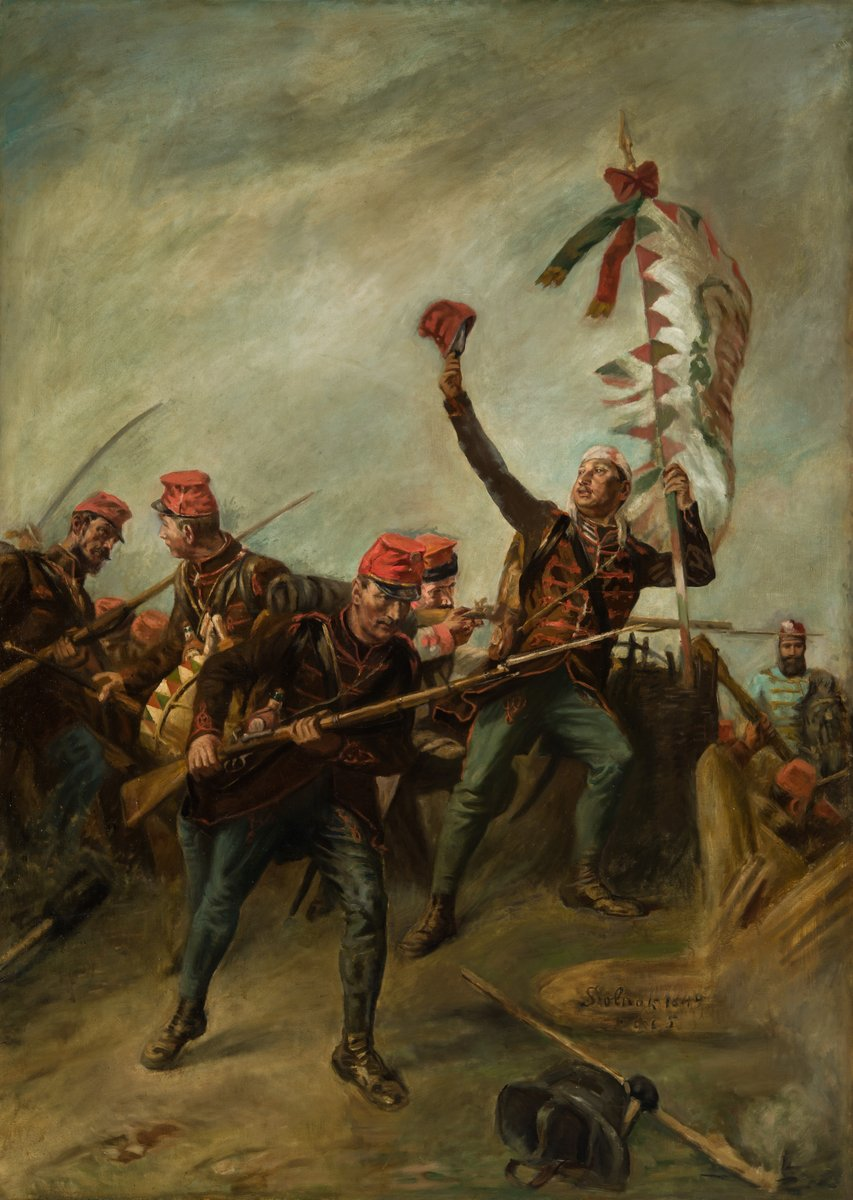
The charge of the 9th (Red hatted) battalion in the Battle of Szolnok, with General János Damjanich in the background – painting by Imre Greguss

With the retreat of the two wings, the imperial troops from the center, which had held their ground the longest, could not resist any longer. All the more so as the Hungarian skirmish lines were already in range, and the columns behind them started to storm. The 3rd Battalion of the 11th Border Guard Infantry Regiment followed the example of the cavalry, which had disappeared from the right flank, and retreated first to the inner and then to the other side of the railway embankment. They were followed by the heavily damaged 5th half Infantry battery, which for the time being had taken up a new firing position to the left of the train station, in line with it, with some of the Kaiserjägers covering it.

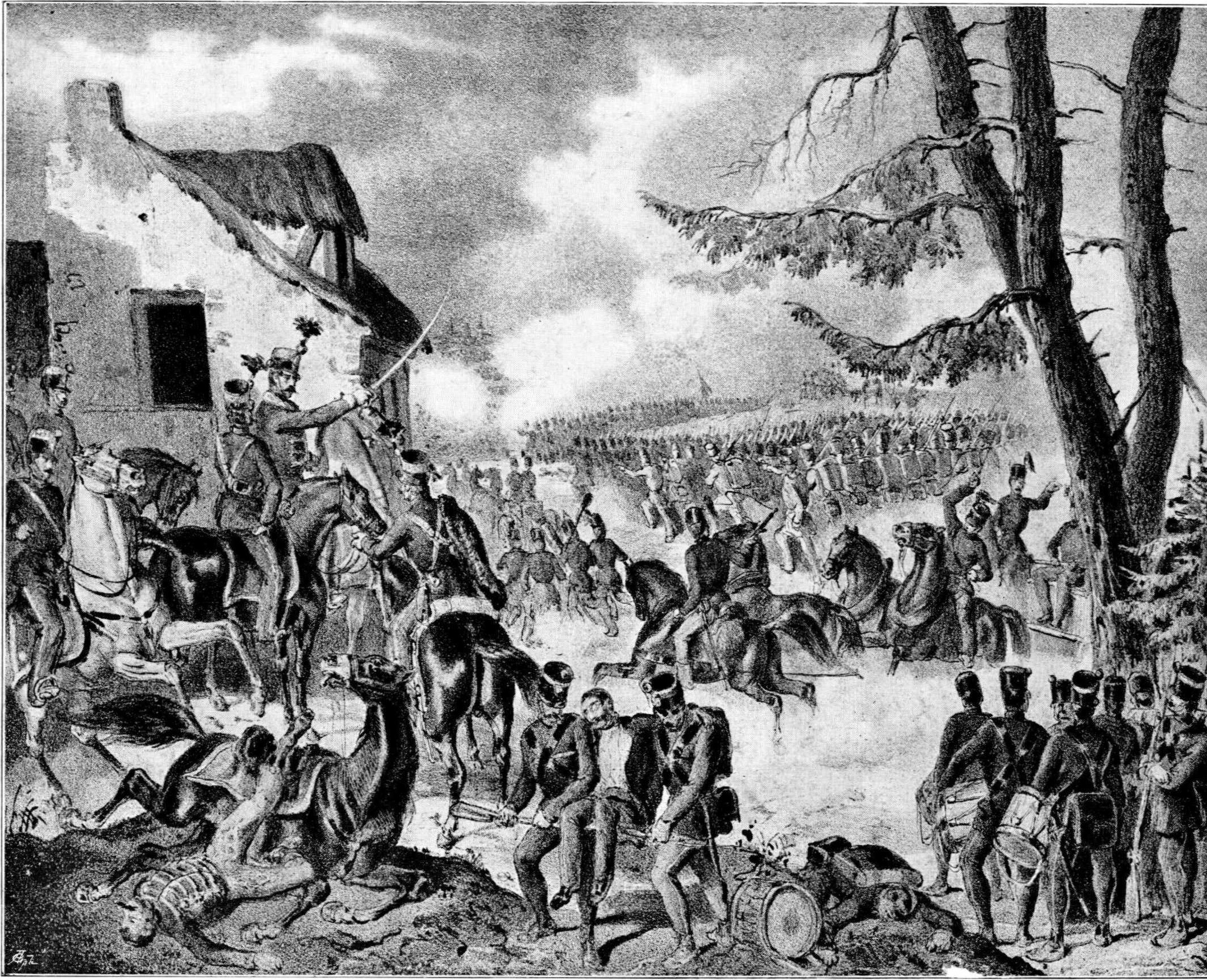
Battle of Szolnok of 5 March 1849 – by Heinrich Gerhardt

The 1st Cavalry Battery and the 2nd Battalion of the 7th Border Guard Infantry Regiment behind it, which had held their position until the end, were then caught in the flanking fire of the Hungarian cavalry artillery advancing on the left, while they continued to be fired at from the front. The imperial cavalry battery, which lost a total of 12 horses and several pieces of artillery, after the advancing Hungarians of the 3rd Honvéd Battalion started to fire on its handling personnel, immediately retreated behind the railway embankment, while one half a company of the border guards occupied the cemetery and a half and the other half took a position in the railway station as skirmishers to cover the retreat of the bulk. These with the 5th Infantry battery held up the Hungarian and Polish skirmish lines for a while, but on the right, after the retreat of the Imperial Kaiserjägers, Leiningen's column pushed towards the town in the open field, and on the left flank Nagysándor with the Hungarian cavalry and cavalry artillery crossed the railway embankment and again encircled his weaker Imperial opponent, defending the railway embankment line. At one point, the 3rd (White Feathered) Battalion put an enemy battery to flight. In Leiningen's words, he put it this way in his memoirs: ‘’But the 3rd Battalion under the gallant Major Bobich stormed the battery from the front, and, despite their most terrible grapeshot fire, chased it off and broke into the town.' Always trying to compete with the White Feathered Battalion in terms of heroic deeds on the battlefield, the 9th (Red Hatted) Honvéd Battalion, envious of the glory of the 3rd, directly attacked an enemy cavalry squadron and routed it. Seeing this, Damjanich was so impressed that he shouted: "Even Napoleon's soldiers did this only once!" With this – after just over half an hour of fighting – the battle on the Hungarian left flank was essentially decided: the general Austrian retreat had begun.

At the same time as the artillery duel that started on the right bank, Vécsey's artillery also started firing on the bridgehead: the four cannons of the infantry battery directly hit the imperial troops from the trench, while the two howitzers set up further away, probably due to the limited space, “flooded” the area behind the ramparts with grenades and shrapnel shells. The two six-pounder guns of the 5th infantry battery in the trenches could not successfully return the fire for a long time, so here the commander of the Imperial defending force, Captain Eduard Ghilain, ordered their withdrawal from the bridgehead relatively soon. On the Hungarian side, the Bátori-Schulz brigade arrived at about 8 o'clock, positioning itself behind the 6th Division, in the cover of the embankment road. Vécsey's aide-de-camp, Major Julian Przyjemski, then sent the 6th Honvéd Battalion and the 3rd Battalion of the 52nd Infantry Regiment to attack the entrenchments, with Bátori's three Honvéd battalions in support. At the beginning of the Hungarian attack, Ghilain withdrew the barely one and ¼ companies of the Imperial line and Kaiserjäger infantry from the bridge to the right bank, while sending half of the 7th sapper company to destroy the bridge, while the other half were aligned into a skirmish line on the river's bank and tried to prevent the Hungarian troops from crossing with rifle fire. Half of the 16th sapper company was in reserve. The sappers had managed to pick up about 11 planks from the bridge, but then the fire of the Hungarian infantry's skirmish lines, which had taken possession of the bridgehead, prevented them from continuing their work; in vain did Ghilain send the carpenters of the other half of the 7th Sappers' company to help the sapper squad. However, the Hungarian troops were prevented from crossing, so preparations could begin to burn the nearer side of the bridge.

=== The Austrian retreat ===
In the meantime, on the right bank, the retreat of the main forces of the imperial army towards the city continued. The artillery batteries of the imperial artillery, taking turns, took up position from time to time with the cavalry in cover, and tried to slow down the advance of the Hungarian troops with their fire; while the bulk of the imperial infantry retreated towards Szolnok under cover of the skirmish lines. After the Hungarian advance cut the main road from Szolnok to Abony, the only way to retreat from the town was the road to the northwest, towards Zagyvarékas. Karger therefore probably withdrew his troops to the following defensive position to cover the road: the Ban's Hussars (which were probably joined by the 3rd platoon of the 1st Lieutenant Colonel's company, which had been left till then behind in the town) were moved to the northern side of the marshy area formed by the "Lake Bottom" and its watercourses. At the same level with them, but on the southern side, on and around the small hill marked by the chapel of Saint Anne, the bulk of the artillery of the Imperial Army (the 1st Cavalry battery, four guns of the 5th Infantry battery and two guns of the 1st 12th Half Battery) was deployed, covered by two squadrons of the 3rd Dragoons (the latter probably joined by the platoon dispatched earlier) and the Lieutenant-Colonel's Platoon of the Ban's Hussars. This detachment effectively blocked the crossing between the marshy areas and the waste-water disposal ditch, thus covering the only stone bridge on the road to the north-west across the ditch. The 3/11 and 2/7 Imperial Frontier Guard battalions, which were retreating through the farmyards surrounding the town from the west, were probably ordered to hold the north-western part of Szolnok along the ditch; while the 3/3 Imperial Line Regiment Battalion and the Kaiserjägers, retreating directly into the town, were to hold its southern part, together with the stone bridge crossed by the main road leading towards the west to Abony. From Szolnok, it is likely that first the baggage and equipment wagons, the ambulance carts of the medics, the vehicles transporting the materials for military bridges of the sappers, and then the ammunition wagons would have had to leave, followed by the infantry and artillery stationed first at the Tisza bridgehead and then those who were in other parts of the city. The rear guard would have been provided by the Imperial Cavalry and artillery.

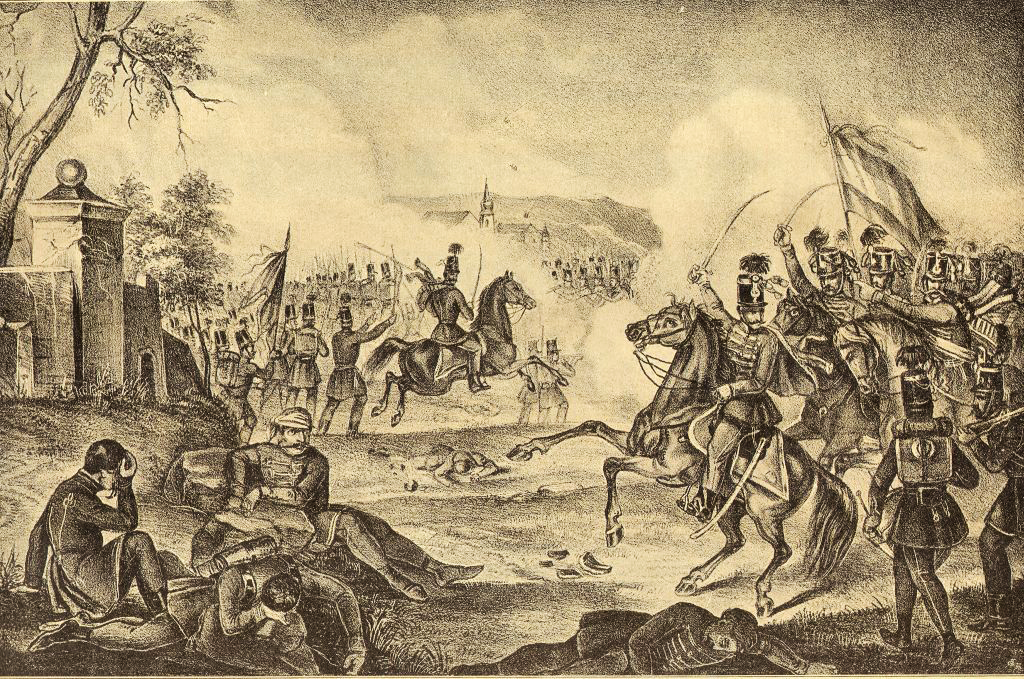
Second Battle of Szolnok 5 March 1849

The advancing Hungarian troops followed the retreating opponent and essentially took the new order of battle adapting to this situation. On the left flank, Nagysándor probably sent the Colonel's Squadron of the 2nd Hussar Regiment and half of the 1st Cavalry Battery under Lieutenant Tóth against the Ban's Hussars, while the bulk of the cavalry and the 8th Cavalry Battery advanced towards the chapel. Wysocki halted the left flank of the center (the jägers, the 9th and 28th Honvéd Battalions, and the 1st Polish Battalion) for a while (probably to avoid congestion), then he tried to catch up with the right flank of the cavalry by moving left through the serried fields. They were probably followed by the 4th and 11th Half Infantry Battery. Meanwhile, the 3rd Battalion tried to enter the city from the west, while the 3/19th and the 3/60th Battalions from the southwest. The Hungarian infantry invading Szolnok had to reach the bridge over the Tisza as soon as possible so that the enemy could not destroy it and Vécsey's troops could cross it and join the forces on the right bank as quickly as possible. In the end, Damjanich sent his reserve cavalry and cavalry artillery to the left flank and his infantry to support the right flank and take the city.

However, the imperials did not manage to conduct the retreat in an orderly manner. The main reason for this was that the brigade had a large number of wagons and carriages, approximately 150, which had to cross the only stone bridge over the inland water drainage ditch to get out of the town towards Zagyvarékas and then they could only proceed on the main road at first because of the swampy terrain. This created huge congestion, first in the area of the bridge and then in the surrounding streets, even though the Brigade's General Officer was personally directing the crossing. Then panic broke out because of the approach of the Hungarian troops, which could only be stopped by the deployment of the 3rd Infantry Company 18th from the bridgehead, and the passing of the wagons could be kept in a more or less orderly manner.

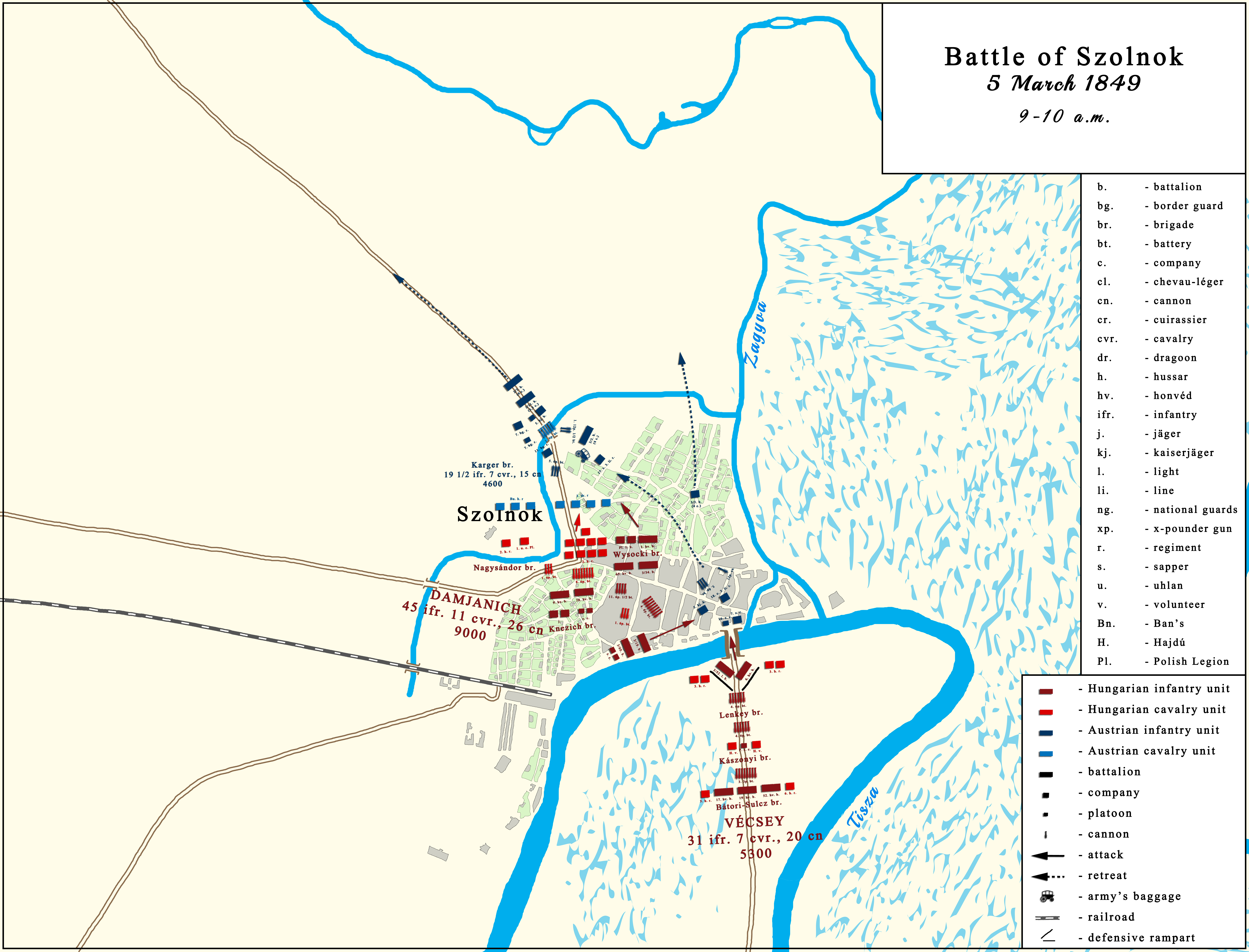
Second Battle of Szolnok (5 March 1849). Situation between 9 – 10 a.m

The second reason was that the commanders of the Imperial Infantry wanted to avoid at all costs the Hungarians' attempts to cut off the possibility of retreat, so they did not take up the fight at the ditch's line, but quickly retreated back to the town. Thus, the pursuing Hungarian troops took possession of the ditch's crossings with relatively little resistance and entered Szolnok, where the real fighting began. The battle was fought mainly by the reinforced skirmisher lines, from behind which the infantry masses sometimes counter-attacked with bayonet charges. The task of the imperial troops was made easier by the fact that during the pursuit the Hungarian infantry's order of battle was broken up, so they could not attack in closed ranks; but at the same time, it was made more difficult by the fact that some of the local population actually joined the fighting, by supporting the Hungarians. The inhabitants of the town shot from their windows in the retreating imperial soldiers, as the Austrian accounts point out about the battle. In the northern part of the town, the 3/11 imperial Border Guard Battalion marched relatively quickly through the city and crossed the stone bridge, but the 2/7th Border Guard Battalion and the 1st squadron of the 5th Kaiserjäger Battalion, which was retreating towards there from the south, showed a staunch resistance slowing down the advance of the Hungarian 3rd (White Feathered) Battalion and the 3/60th, and probably the 3/34th line regiment Battalions, which came from reserve. This was further complicated by the fact that Lieutenant Colonel Schön, who took over command of the southern part of the town, sent the two six-pounder guns (and probably a 12-pounder cannon withdrawn from the fortress) that had been there at the Tisza bridgehead, accompanied by half a company of Imperial Kaiserjägers and a few platoons of border guards, to the northern part of Szolnok, and that the border guard platoons that had been protecting the city's entrances to the eastern streets, left their positions, and they mostly rejoined their retreating regular units. From the three incoming guns and the Kaiserjägers, Karger improvised another defense on the outskirts of the town to protect the stone bridge over the ditch.

Meanwhile, in the south, the 3/19th line Regiment battalion under Leiningen captured, without resistance, the stone bridge over the ditch, with the road leading to the west, and then, entering the town, they ran into the defense of four companies of the 3/3rd line Regiment Battalion in the area of the Franciscan monastery. Leiningen, sent a squadron of his battalion, probably led by Captain Pál Horváth, to encircle the Imperial troops in a side street, and another squadron to the Tisza's bank for a similar purpose, and tried to advance with the main force from the front. Fighting ferociously, the K.u.K. troops slowly retreated towards the bridgehead; one of their counter-attacks almost killing Leiningen himself. For the second time, Lieutenant-Colonel Schön's Imperial Battalion blocked the Hungarian advance on the main street at the level of the salt depots, but as their right flank was outflanked by Horváth's detachment, Schön decided to break through northwards, which he did successfully. However, he apparently did not inform, about his retreat, Captain Ghilain, whose troops, while holding up Vécsey's advance and trying to burn the bridge, noticed that a Hungarian infantry squad had appeared on the right bank of the Tisza. Ghilain then turned the bulk of his troops against them and drove them back with a bayonet charge as far as the salt depots; here, however, he ran into the main force of the 65th Honvéd Battalion, which was approaching from the reserve along the riverbank. A detachment of the imperial sappers then took shelter in one of the salt stores and opened fire from there, while the others defended themselves on the shore. In the meantime, however, Horváth's detachment reached and captured the northern bridgehead of the Tisza bridge, thus putting the Imperial troops in a position of encirclement. Ghilain and his men then broke through northwards; soon the squad trapped in the warehouse (which had been set on fire by the Honvéds) followed them, pursued by the Hungarian 65th battalion. The southern part of the town and the Tisza bridge was thus taken (essentially intact) by the Hungarian troops. Vécsey's infantry immediately started to cross on the beams, while the Hungarian troops started to replace the planks the Austrian sappers had picked up, so that the artillery and cavalry could cross the Tisza. Meanwhile, Leiningen's battalion also turned north and, together with the 65th Honvéd Battalion, began clearing the eastern half of the town of the fragments of the retreating imperial troops (mainly the rearguard) which could not follow the retreating main troops.

Outside the town, at the chapel of St. Anne, the 12th Imperial Battery and the 8 cannons of the Hungarian artillery, together with the cavalry units which were covering them, were engaged in a ferocious duel. The problems of the Imperial side were increased, however, by the appearance on the right of the Hungarian cavalry of a Hungarian infantry column (Jägers, the 1st Polish Battalion, the 9th and 28th Honvéd Battalions) through the stack-yards, forcing them to redirect the fire of the 12-pounder half battery towards the Hungarian column. The main problem, however, was that the imperial batteries, which had been firing almost continuously since the beginning of the battle, were slowly running out of ammunition, and as the ammunition supply wagons were stuck in the "traffic jam" at the bridge over the ditch, they could not be refilled. So they had to be withdrawn battery by battery from the firing line behind the cavalry, gradually moved behind the already crossed Imperial troops on the Zagyvarékas road, and sent towards this locality. This process must have been noticed by Captain Władisław Poniński, commander of the 1st Company of the 1st Polish Uhlans Regiment, who asked Colonel Ágoston Pikéty, commander of the 2nd Hussars Regiment, for permission to attack. As it was not customary to attack heavy cavalry from the front with light cavalry, Pikéty was not in favor of the idea, but at the urging of the Polish officer he finally gave permission to attack, with the words If you will not stand still, go, in the name of the three devils! Apart from the well-known audacity of the Poles, Poniński's attack may have been inspired by the fact that his Uhlans, attacking in a closed order with their long pikes, had a much better chance of breaking through the line of the imperial dragoons than the Hussars.

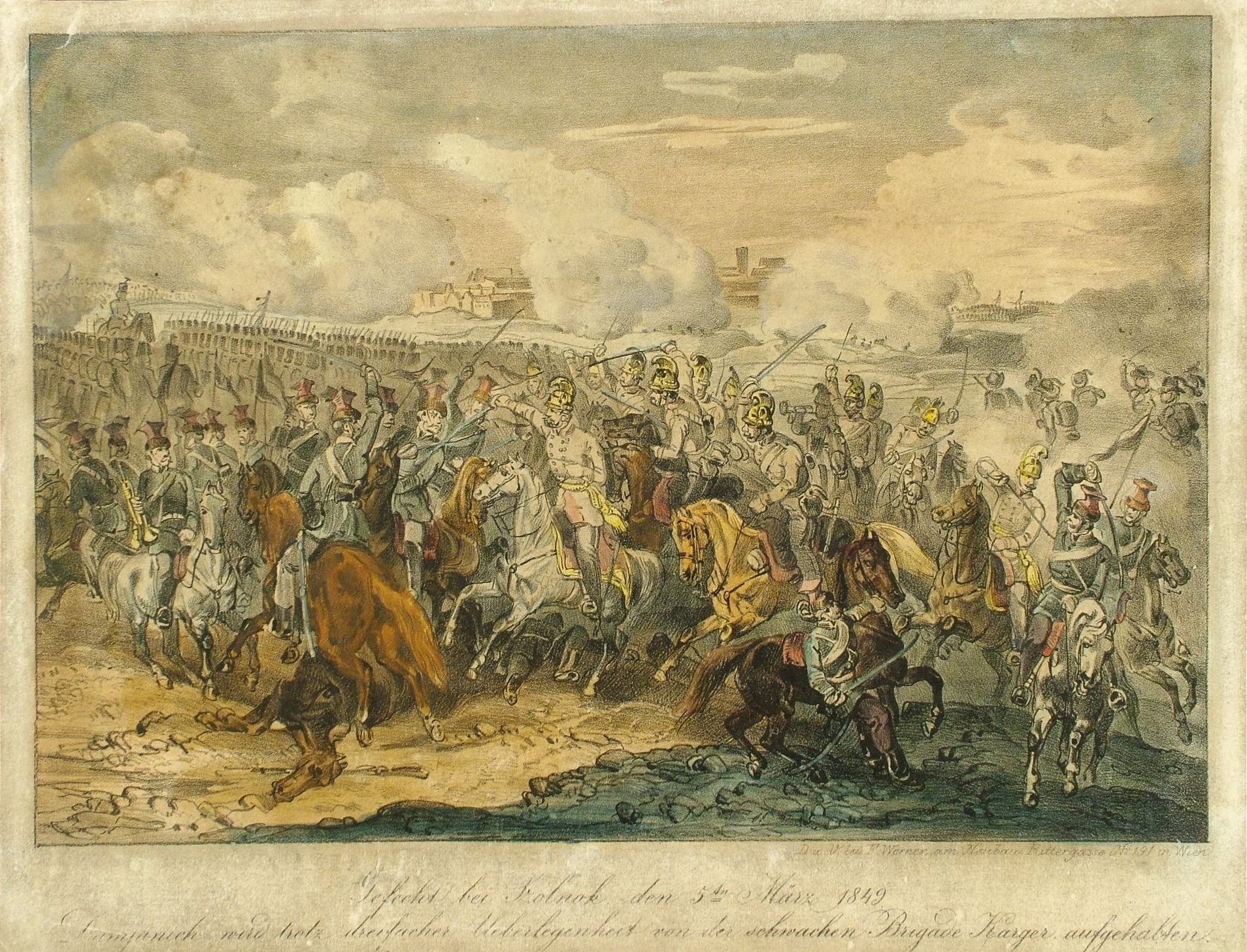
Cavalry skirmish at Szolnok, 5 March 1849 – F. Werner

After the 8th Cavalry battery had ceased fire, the Poles moved forward. In order to intercept the attack and allow the artillery to retreat, Lieutenant-Colonel Josef Regelsberg also launched an attack with his dragoons. However, the line of the Lieutenant-Colonel's Squadron under his personal command – despite their rifle fire – was broken by the Uhlans, who attacked with greater momentum in a closed order. But after that, the Poles were outnumbered, surrounded, and, no longer having the advantage of their pikes in close combat, suffered heavy losses. However, they were soon rescued by a company (probably the 2nd) of the 2nd Hussar Regiment's Lieutenant-Colonel's squadron led by Vice-Captain Aurél Mukits, which had been covering the 8th Cavalry Battery, and together they routed the Imperial Cavalry. The Major's Squadron of the Dragoons, led by Major Prokop Dobrzonsky (Dobrženský), also on the attack, fared even worse. While their attack was just starting, the 2nd Major Division of the 3rd Hussar Regiment from the reserve arrived on the right flank of the Hungarian cavalry with the other half of the 1st Cavalry battery, and after a lightning-fast unlimbering of the half-battery led by Lieutenant Schiedebaum, he shot grapeshot into the approaching dragoons, thus breaking their ranks, and causing them disarray. The disoriented Dragoons were then attacked by the 1st Major's Squadron of the 2nd Hussar Regiment led by Captain Teodor Rudzinsky, who, with the order "Cut the officers!", encircled the enemy from the right and drove them back to the line of the 5th imperial Infantry battery and the 1st 12th half Infantry battery. The scattered imperial cavalrymen, artillerymen, and charioteers managed to prevent the breakthrough in hand-to-hand combat and salvage the batteries' ammunition but suffered significant losses in personnel, and a total of 5 ammunition wagons were captured by the Hussars. Meanwhile, on the other side too, the fight was decided. The 3rd Hussar Regiment's 1st Company of the 2nd Major's Squadron (perhaps its 2nd wing ) led by First Lieutenant János Melczer, which until then had probably been covering half of the 1st Cavalry battery, also received permission to charge. Melczer cut through the still-fighting troops and got into the flank of the 1st Imperial Cavalry Regiment, then after scattering the Ban's hussar platoon, which served as cover, he threw himself on the battery with his hussars and captured two guns. First Lieutenant Arthur Bylandt managed only to send the other half of his battery to the rear. Then, in pursuit of the fleeing dragoons, Poniński arrived with a platoon of Uhlans, as well as a section of Mukits's hussars. Together they broke the resistance, causing the loss of two-thirds of the 1st Cavalry battery's personnel, as well as a total of three guns, five ammunition wagons, and two other carriages. The rest of the escaping artillery and Dragoons joined the main body of the brigade at the bridge, while the rest of them probably pushed themselves to the other bank through the marsh. Thus the organized resistance of the imperial troops collapsed here, and the way was opened for the Hungarian cavalry to the northern bridgehead of the stone bridge over the ditch.

In the foreground of this bridge, the improvised imperial half battery, which was then already being covered by the squadrons of the 18th company of the K.u.K. 3. regiment, successfully prevented for the time being the Hungarian infantry's attack from the direction of the town. Thanks to this, most of the carriages and cannons crossed the bridge. At the same time, Karger was able to send the 17th Company of the 3rd Line Infantry Regiment, followed by the 1st Squadron of the 5th Kaiserjägers and the 2/7 Border Guard Battalion across the river, followed probably by himself. The 3rd Honvéd Battalion did not continue its frontal attack but probably tried to get in the flank of the Imperial half battery from the left, by marching through the side streets along the ditch. In the meantime, however, four companies of the 3/3 Line Regiment Battalion of the Imperial Army arrived at the bridgehead, followed by the sappers in a rather disorganized state, as well as the first refugees from the chapel, announcing the breakthrough of the Hungarian cavalry. Panic broke out again and order was completely disrupted. Although some of the baggage and ammunition were still on the eastern bank, Lieutenant-Colonel Schön sent his battalion, which had just been regrouped, to cross the bridge and the ditch beside it to the other bank. His example was followed by the 18th company and by the sappers. Upon this the K.u.K. half-battery also limbered, and together with the baggage wagons and the ammunition supply tried to reach the crossing to squeeze through, but only one of the six-pounder guns succeeded. Because meanwhile, from the southeast, Leiningen with his troops were approaching the bridgehead and prepared to attack, assembling a mixed detachment (from the soldiers of the 3/19th Line Battalion and the 65th Honvéd Battalion) in order to succeed. The Major sent a small squad of soldiers under cover between the houses near the bridge, who opened fire, killing the horses of the carriage that was crossing, and blocking the traffic. Then the troops themselves went on a bayonet charge and, overcoming the remaining resistance, captured the bridge. The two guns trapped on the eastern bank (the 12-pounder of which probably fell into the ditch), part of the ammunition, and the rest of the baggage became the prey of Leiningen's infantry. The momentum of the Hungarian attack was such powerful that many imperial soldiers were pushed to the waters, killing dozens of enemy soldiers. Thirty to forty boats filled with fleeing soldiers sunk into the Zagyva. The soldiers from these boats drowned in the river, being dragged down by their heavy equipment.

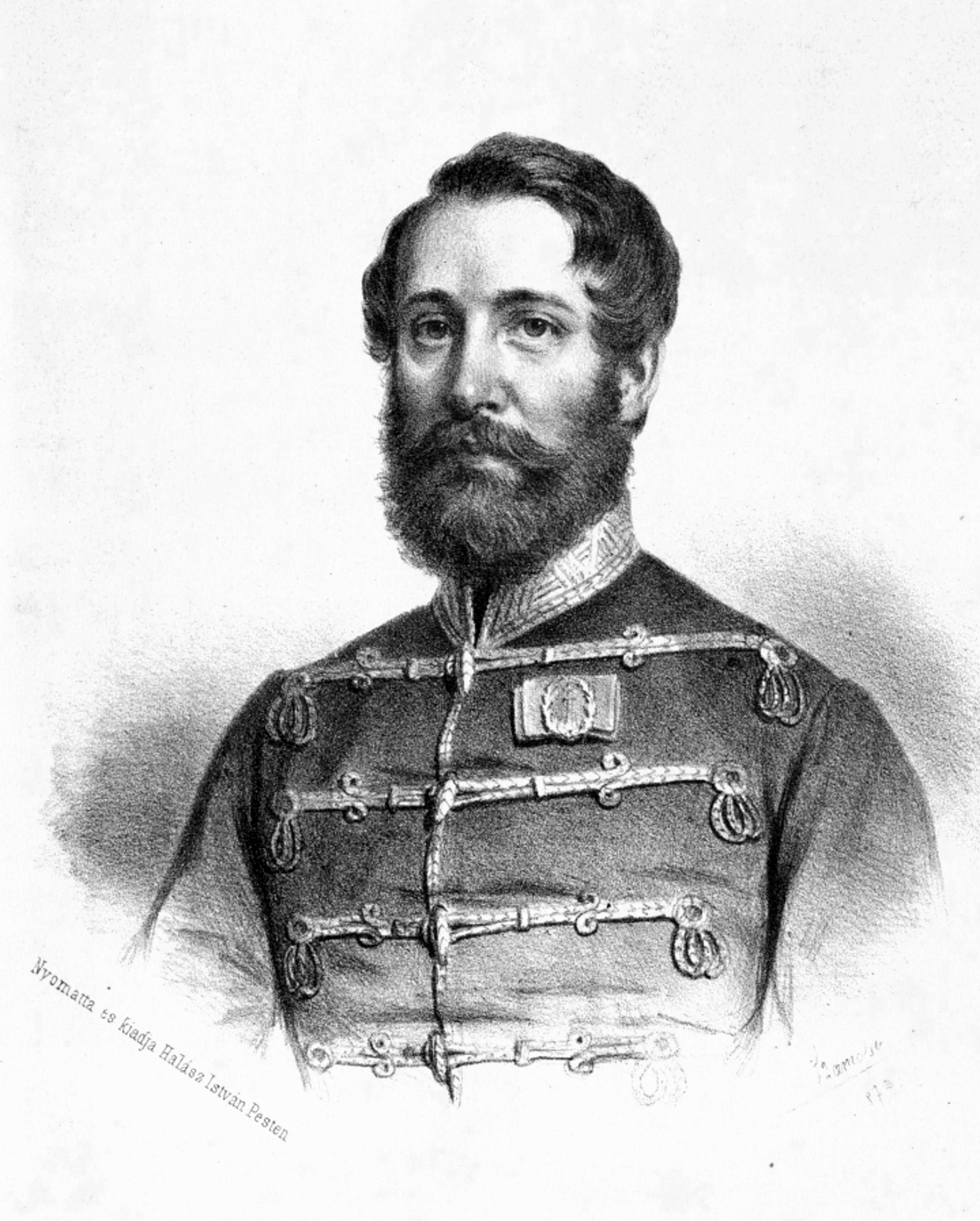
Leiningen-Westerburg Károly

Meanwhile, the K.u.K. Brigade started to retreat towards Zagyvarékas and Abony. The vanguard and the baggage cover were provided by the Ban's hussars, while the imperial infantry provided the rear guard. They protected the scattered units of the Imperial Artillery and the Dragoon Cavalry which just arrived. Smaller, disorganized Hussar squads were already attacking some of the Imperial Infantry between the marshy area and the trench, but they were relatively easily repulsed by the massed troops. A squadron of Hussars temporarily captured a six-pounder cannon moving away from the bridge, but the 18th Company of the 3rd K.u.K. line Regiment counterattacked and recaptured it. In the meantime, Nagysándor launched the attack of his hitherto reserve cavalry, the 2nd Major's Squadrons of the 2nd of the 3rd Hussars Regiments. By this time, the Imperial main column had crossed the marshy area and reached a well-walkable terrain; except for the Imperial "rearguard's rearguard", i.e. the sappers. They had been attacked by the 2nd Major Squadron of the 2nd Hussar Regiment, led probably by Major Ernst Hügel, and a platoon of Polish Uhlans already on the eastern bank of the ditch, and before they could form a shooting mass, so the Hungarian cavalry dispersed this unit, causing them heavy losses, pushing them into the marsh. The pursuit also continued in the open field: the squadrons of the 2nd Hussar Regiment, the 2nd Major's Squadron of the 3rd Hussar Regiment, and the Polish Uhlans continuously attacked the retreating infantry from three directions, which (lacking organized cavalry and artillery cover) tried to defend themselves with rifle fire. But the situation changed when the Hungarian cavalry batteries arrived and opened fire on the retreating imperial infantry. Panic broke out in the ranks of the Imperial 11/3rd Border Guard Battalion after the first shells hit them and despite the best efforts of Major Eugen Lazić, part of the battalion routed. Although initially the K.u.K. baggage was sent to the north, to the so-called "Mill Corner", to cross the Zagyva and turn westwards, leaving the road to Zagyvarékas on the south side of the river open for the troops, this could not be accomplished because of the earlier demolition of the bridge there. Thus, the Imperial train was forced to turn back to the southern road, which only added to the confusion among the Imperial troops.

In the same way, the ranks of the 3/3rd Line Infantry Regiment Battalion, which had already been retreating in several separate squads, began to disintegrate; only the 1st Division of the 5th Imperial Kaiserjägers and the 2/7 Border Guard Battalion were able to maintain their closed formation. It was only a matter of time, however, before the well-functioning Hungarian artillery would disperse them, so that the cavalry could launch an all-out charge, which would have led to the complete destruction of the still combat-ready units of the Imperial Brigade covering the routing soldiers. But then the Hungarian pursuit was suddenly interrupted, and only the half of the 1st Cavalry Regiment led by Lieutenant Tóth continued to follow the retreating rearguard of the imperial army towards the nearby forest. It was no "miracle": the Imperial cavalry brigade led by General Ferenc Ottinger Guard arrived in front of Szolnok.

=== Ottinger arrives ===
Ottinger was informed at Abony at around 8 a.m. by Karger's assistant officer, sent with the train, that Hungarian troops had crossed the Tisza at Cibakháza and Tiszaföldvár and were advancing from Tószeg towards Szolnok. He immediately alerted his brigade and sent Karger's aide-de-camp to Cegléd to inform also Lieutenant-General Hartlieb of the Hungarian attack. Around half past eight Ottinger's brigade (5 companies of the 6th Cuirassier Regiment, 6 companies of the 7th Cuirassier Regiment, the 5th Cavalry Battery, and half of the 1st twelve-pounder Battery; in total about 1400 men and 9 guns) departed towards Szolnok; leaving the 3rd Squadron of the 3/11 Border Guard Battalion, stationed here, to defend Abony. Since he believed that Karger could hold Szolnok with his reinforced brigade until he arrived, he did not head straight for the city, but south of the railway line, on the road to Tószeg, in order to threaten the retreat of the attacking Hungarian army by getting to its left side. When they were half an hour from Tószeg, Ottinger and his escort rode towards Szolnok, hearing the increasing sound of cannon roar, where he could first notice that the firing line of the Hungarian artillery was already visible on the northern side of the railway. Then, climbing on the top of a small hill on the south side of the railway, he was shocked to see that the fighting was already north-west of the town and that Karger's brigade, strongly pressed by the Hungarians from three directions, was retreating towards Zagyvarékas. Ottinger, therefore, decided to turn his brigade to the left and cross the railway embankment at the railway guard's station, about 3000 paces from Szolnok, and take up a position on the Szolnok-Abony road towards the town. This would presumably draw the attention of the Hungarian troops and thus help Karger's troops to retreat.

The appearance of the Imperial Cavalry south of the railway was noticed by the Hungarian side. Since Damjanich's cavalry, part of his infantry and artillery was in pursuit of Karger's brigade, and the rest of his infantry was still regrouping at Szolnok, it was up to Vécsey's troops to hold off the newly arrived Austrian forces. As the repair of the Tisza bridge had meanwhile been completed, the major-general moved his cavalry and artillery to the town, then hurried with his own troops towards the western edge of the city, while he left two battalions of Bátori-Schulz's infantry to secure Szolnok and guard the prisoners and booty. The rest of the brigade remained on the left bank of the Tisza. In front of the town, on both sides of the Szolnok-Abony road, the division took up battle positions. The 3rd Cavalry Battery and the Lieutenant-Colonel's and the 1st Major's Squadrons of the 3rd Hussar Regiment were in the first line, while the 3/52 Line Regiment, the 5th Infantry Battery, and the 6th Honvéd Battalion were in the second line. The Hajdú Volunteer Cavalry Squadron with 2 guns of the infantry battery probably defended the railway line on the left flank of the second line; later the 1st Uhlan Company of the Polish Legion also arrived there. The right flank of Vécsey's infantry was then gradually joined by Damjanich's battalions and infantry batteries, which had been turned back from the pursuit and those stationed in the city, and took up battle formation in front of Szolnok.

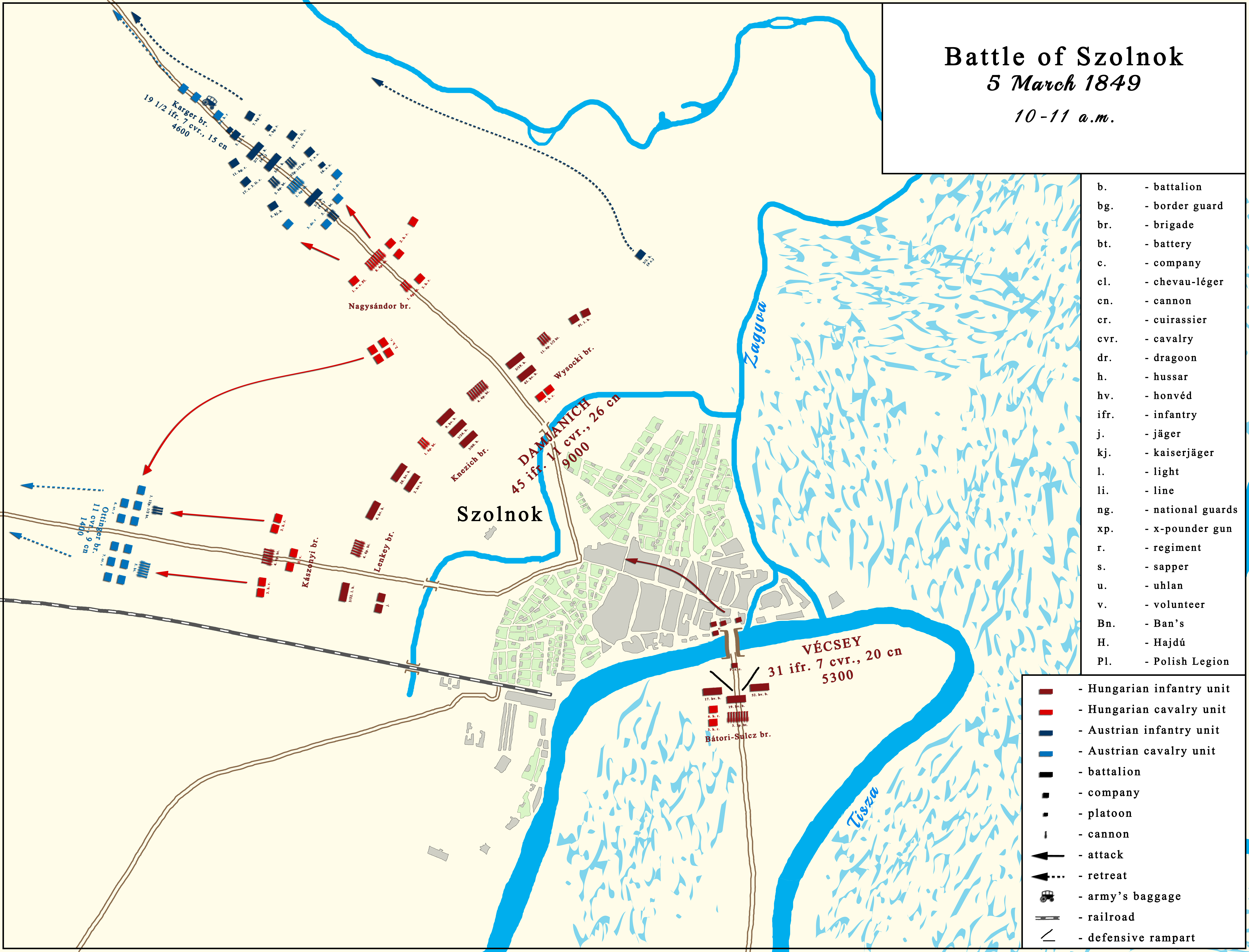
Second Battle of Szolnok (5 March 1849). Situation between 10 – 11 a.m

Ottinger sent the 5th Cavalry Battery, probably under the cover of the 2nd Lieutenant-Colonel's Company of the 7th Cuirassier Regiment, across the northern side of the railway embankment to draw on themselves the attention of the Hungarian artillery that was opening fire, and then under its fire cover he started to lead the rest of his troops across the embankment. Probably the first who crossed over to the other side, and unlimbered on the main road, was the 1st K.u.K. twelve-pounder half-battery escorted by a wing of the 2nd Major's Company of the 6th Cuirassier Regiment. Vécsey tried to take advantage of this moment (when most of the Imperial Heavy Cavalry was still on the other side of the embankment) and sent two squadrons of the 3rd Hussars Regiment to attack the Imperial batteries. Although the wet terrain slowed down the attack somewhat, both squadrons reached the enemy despite the fire of the imperial batteries. However, the 2nd Lieutenant-Colonel's Company of the 7th Cuirassier Regiment managed to hold off the attacking Hussar squadron before the 5th Cavalry Battery, and after the arrival of the Major's Company and part of the 2nd Regimental Company of the 7th Cuirassier Regiment, they together drove back the enemy. On the other side, the 1st imperial 12-pounder half-battery was not so lucky: the attacking squadron of the 3rd Hussars Regiment first pushed back half of the 2nd Major's Company of the 6th Cuirassier Regiment, then broke into the battery's position and, despite the best efforts of the Cavalry artillerymen, captured a 12-pounder gun and three ammunition wagons. But the incoming Colonel's Squadron of the 6th Cuirassier Regiment managed to recover the cannon, and after the arrival of the Major's Squadron and the 2nd Colonel's Company of the 7th Cuirassier Regiment, the overwhelming superiority of the Austrian riders drove the Hussars back, causing them heavy losses. The three ammunition wagons were again in the hands of the imperials.

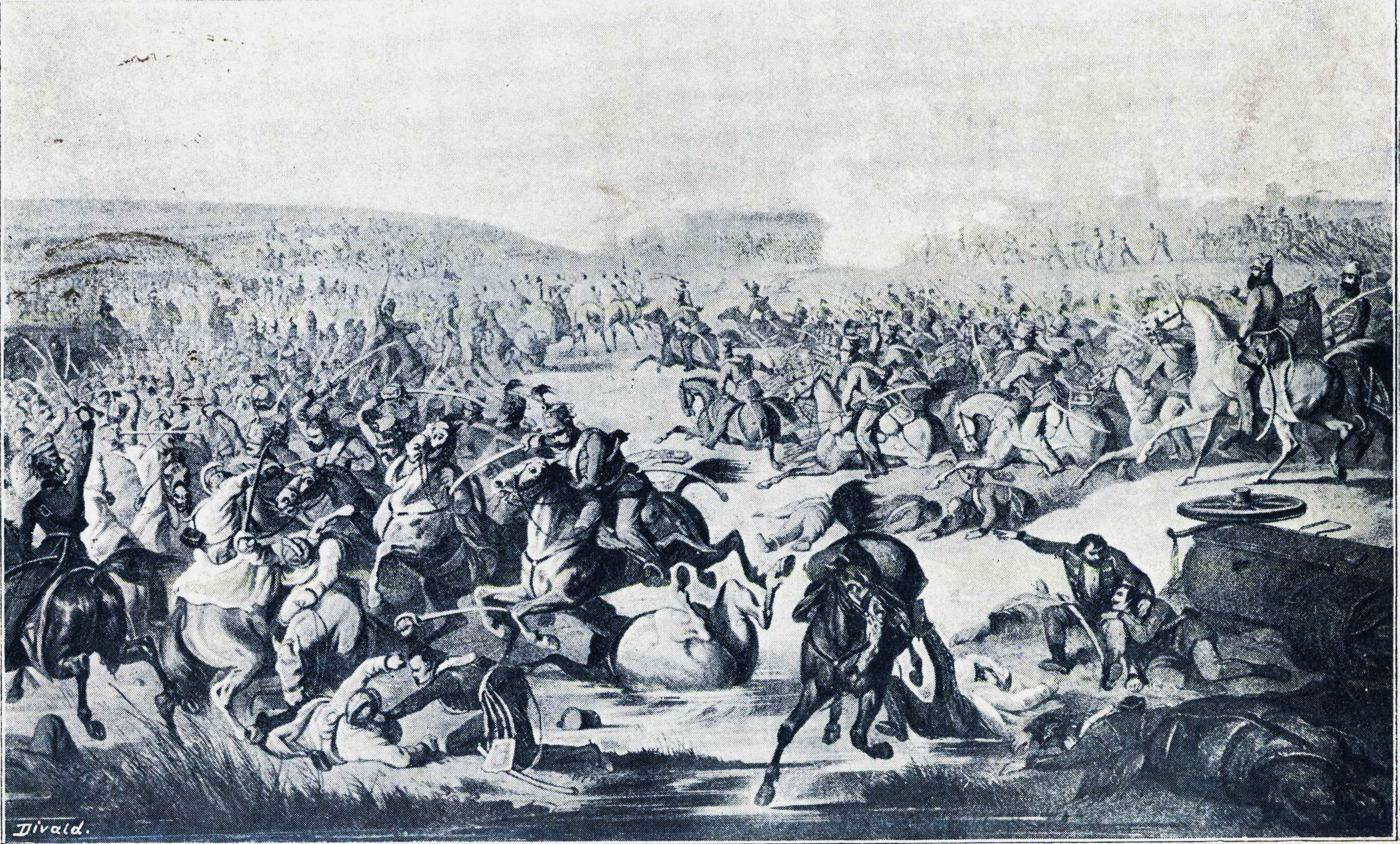
The attack of the Hungarian 3rd (Ferdinand) Hussar Regiment and the Polish Uhlans at the end of the Battle of Szolnok from 5 March 1849

After the Hungarian attack was repulsed, the entire imperial cavalry brigade was able to deploy on both sides of the road and for the time being the two sides were content with a mutual cannonade. It remained like this until another Hungarian cavalry column (the 1st Major's Squadron of the 2nd Hussar Regiment, probably the 8th Cavalry Battery, and another Hussar squadron) started to approach from the side. Ottinger then felt that he had given Karger enough time to retreat, and as he did not want to be flanked, he ordered a gradual retreat, which he carried out squadron by squadron. This was not easy either, as in one place in the rear of the brigade the muddy, uneven terrain reduced the passable terrain to practically the road; in addition, the four ammunition carriages of the retreating Austrian artillery were so sunk in the mud that they could not be moved. Ottinger left behind the Lieutenant-colonel's squadron of the 6th Cuirassier Regiment and a squadron of the 7th Cuirassier Regiment of the Imperial Army to cover their withdrawal, which repulsed the first attack attempt of two squadrons of the 3rd Hussar Regiment which was pursuing the retreating Imperial Brigade. But when the Hardegg Cuirassiers also retreated to the other side of the ravine, and the 1st Major's Squadron of the 2nd Hussar Regiment arrived on the Hungarian side, the new Hungarian attack was crowned with success: the Lieutenant Colonel's Squadron of the 6th Cuirassier Regiment was forced to retreat, and the four ammunition wagons (one of the 5th Cavalry Battery and three of the 1st twelve-pounder Battery) were captured by the Hussars. With that – at around 11 o'clock – the battle was essentially over. Ottinger retreated to Abony with his cavalry, where he took up position in order of battle in front of the town until dark, and the Hungarian troops remained in their positions for about an hour, then, after the outposts had been installed, they set up camp in Szolnok and around the town.

In the meantime, during the morning, Karger's aide-de-camp arrived in Cegléd to the division commander Lieutenant General Karl Hartlieb and informed him of the events and Ottinger's orders. Hartlieb sounded the alarm, and at about 10 a.m. with the reinforced imperial Gramont brigade (the Imperial 3/1 battalion and the 2/8 Border Guard Battalion, the Bittermann Grenadier Battalion, a company of the Major's Squadron of the Ban's Hussars Regiment, the 6th Infantry Battery, the 2nd twelve-pounder Battery and half of the 16th Congreve Rocket Battery; in all, about 2,900 men and 15 guns) he departed towards Törtel, leaving Major General Daniel Rastić with the remaining troops to defend Cegléd. He informed the Commandment of the Imperial I. Corps about his measures. Since, in the same way as Ottinger, Hartlieb also assumed that Karger would be able to hold Szolnok enough, he also planned to advance towards Tószeg, in order to join Ottinger's right flank and threaten the enemy's retreat. On his arrival at Törtel, however, it turned out that Karger's aide-de-camp, whom the lieutenant-general had sent after Ottinger to inform him about his plan, had returned without accomplishing his mission. The patrols sent out by him could not obtain any meaningful information about Ottinger's troops or the enemy. Because of his weak cavalry, Hartlieb did not risk a further advance, so he and his troops set off towards Abony, where he arrived at 5 p.m. Around 1 p.m. also arrived here from Tápiószele a part of the Bellegarde cavalry brigade (about 1000 men and 6 guns), which formed the vanguard of the II. Corps. The 5,600 men and 30 guns thus available seemed sufficient to hold back a possible further Hungarian attack, so Hartlieb began here that evening and during the night to reorganize the fleeing units of the Karger Brigade, which started to arrive. It is somewhat odd that both General Ottinger and Hartlieb, instead of trying to take the shortest route to help their stranded comrade, Karger, thought of such a time-consuming operation, i.e. the circumvention of the enemy.

== Aftermath ==
Opinions differ on the Austrian losses. According to historian Krisztián Kemény, based on the final Austrian casualty report of 22 March 1849, the Austrian losses were 545 men killed, wounded, and prisoners; in addition, 311 horses, 5 guns, 25 ammunition wagons and two other carriages with equipment, 12 wagons with baggage and other equipment, and two wagons with the treasury of the troops. According to Róbert Hermann, there were 33 dead, 23 wounded, 404 (260–500) missing, and prisoners, while about another 218 is not known if they were dead, wounded, or missing, for a total of 678 human losses. To these were added 220 horses and 5 (11) guns lost. According to historian Jószef Bánlaky, 227 men in the 3rd Battalion of Archduke Charles' Regiment, 222 men in the 3rd Battalion of the 2nd Bács Regiment, 108 men in the 2 Battalion of the Bród Border Guard Regiment, 19 men in the 5th Battalion of the 5th Kaiserjäger Regiment, 97 men and 92 horses in the Franz Joseph Dragoons; a total of 673 men and 92 horses. Although they were high, the casualties among the sappers, artillerists, and wagon handlers were not recorded. Hundreds of people died in the Zagyva and around 800 were taken prisoner. So, according to Bánlaky, the Austrian losses were as high as 2000. According to historian Gábor Bagi, 5 cannons, 16–17 ammunition wagons, and about 330 horses were lost. This was a loss of a magnitude never before suffered by the imperial forces on the Hungarian theater of war. According to Bánlaky, the Dragoons regiment's treasury of 7,000 Florins, were also captured by the Hungarians, but Damjanich returned the treasury to Abony the next day, showing unparalleled fairness to the enemy. It should be noted, finally, that most of the Karger brigade's baggage was also lost.

The exact number of casualties on the Hungarian side is not known, but is usually put at around 300, including Lieutenant Colonel Puchly, the enthusiastic commander of 3d Hussar Regiment, and Captain Károly Szilvay, who received 12 wounds. On the imperial side, Karger could not avoid prosecution. As his brigade had not only suffered heavy losses, but had also been disabled for several days, he reported sick before his dismissal, probably on the afternoon of 6 March, and left for the capital. He was no longer allowed to lead troops in the field and was forced to temporarily retire in 1850.

With the victory at Szolnok, all the crossings of the Tisza were now in the hands of the Hungarian troops. The victory allowed the Hungarian army to take the initiative again by quickly regrouping the Hungarian troops.

But shortly after the victory, the two commanders entered a serious conflict with each other. The conflict arose from the fact that Damjanich, lower in rank, was entrusted with the task of conducting the attack, while General Vécsey was only invited in support. After the battle of Szolnok, the 6th and 8th divisions were united into one corps, and General Damjanich became subordinate to Vécsey as a senior general. Damjanich, however, ascribing to himself the credit for the success of the enterprise, not only wished to retain his autonomy as division commander but, despite his subordinate relation to Vécsey, reproached him for the delay in carrying through the attack, using even offensive words. To remedy this untenable situation, Vécsey appealed to Dembiński, asking him to come to Szolnok in person and take command of the III. Corps himself. Dembinski forwarded Vécsey's letter to Kossuth in Debrecen with the following note: I see that the cause of Hungary will be ruined, not by the enemy, but by internal strife, and as it is always the case in such cases, not even in a honorable way. The unpleasant affair was finally settled when Damjanich was appointed commander of the III Corps in recognition of his merits, while Vécsey, having handed over his division, traveled to Debrecen on 6 March. Although Damjanich initially wanted to defend Szolnok, the reports from the reconnaissance clearly indicated the growing superiority of the imperial forces. Therefore, on the afternoon of 9 March, the General withdrew his troops from the city, which, after destroying the defenses and the bridge over the Tisza, retreated to Törökszentmiklós and Cibakháza. Thereafter, neither side stationed a permanent garrison in Szolnok: during March, only the two sides' reconnaissance forces visited the town on a daily basis.

The events and the result of the battle of Szolnok on 5 March 1849 (apart from the fact that the imperials lost the only crossing on the Tisza for a short time) clearly indicated that a significant part of the Hungarian troops and their commanders had reached a level of combat power that it was not advisable to make tactical-strategic mistakes against them, trusting that the Austrian troops would somehow "solve" the situation with their supposedly superior fighting strength. But the Imperial General Staff did not seem to draw the right conclusion from this negative experience: in a letter of 7 March 1849, the imperial commander in chief Field Marshal Alfred I, Prince of Windisch-Grätz only called on the commander of the I. Corps Lieutenant Lıeutenant General Josip Jelačić to increase reconnaissance and security, so that similar incidents to the one in Szolnok could be avoided in the future. For, as the Imperial Commander-in-Chief wrote, this was the only way that the Imperial troops could be defeated by a force composed of unprepared, weak troops. The latter words proved to be a big mistake from Windisch-Grätz. 5 more weeks passed, and the "unprepared, weak troops", together with their similarly "novice" commanders, will put an end to the Prince's military career once and for all.

== Sources ==
- Bánlaky, József (2001). A magyar nemzet hadtörténelme ("The Military History of the Hungarian Nation) (in Hungarian). Budapest: Arcanum Adatbázis.
- Bóna, Gábor (1987). Tábornokok és törzstisztek a szabadságharcban 1848–49 ("Generals and Staff Officers in the War of Freedom 1848–1849") (in Hungarian). Budapest: Zrínyi Katonai Kiadó. p. 430. ISBN 963-326-343-3.
- Hermann, Róbert (2001), 1848-1849 a szabadságharc hadtörténete ("Military History of 1848-1849") (in Hungarian), Budapest: Korona, ISBN 963-9376-21-3
- Hermann, Róbert (2004). Az 1848–1849-es szabadságharc nagy csatái ("Great battles of the Hungarian Revolution of 1848-1849") (in Hungarian). Budapest: Zrínyi. p. 408. ISBN 963-327-367-6.
- Hoffmann Arnold Az 1848-49-iki Vörös-sapkás 9-ik Honvédzászlóalj története ("The History of the 9th Red Hatted Battalion from 1848-49"). Kassa, 1906
- Kemény, Krisztián (2018), "A második szolnoki ütközet (1849 március 5) ("The Second Battle of Szolnok (5 March 1849)")" (PDF), Hadtörténelmi Közlemények, 131. évf. 2. sz. (in Hungarian)
- Szathmáry, István (2018), "Mennyire hihetünk a korabeli hadijelentések adatainak a szolnoki csatáról? ("How Much we can Believe to the Dates of the Military Reports about the Battle of Szolnok?")", SZOLJON. Jász-Nagykun-Szolnok Vármegyei Hírportál. 2018.03.15. (in Hungarian)
