= Battle of Cibakháza =

Battle in the Hungarian War of Independence 1848-1849

Coordinates: 46°56′32.0″N 20°10′23.0″E

- Part of the Hungarian Revolution of 1848
Date	24 February 1849
Location	Cibakháza, Szolnok County, Kingdom of Hungary
Result	Hungarian victory

Belligerents
Hungarian Revolutionary Army	Austrian Empire

Commanders and leaders
Károly Leiningen-Westerburg	Ferenc Ottinger

Strength
4,450 men 17 cannons	3,257 men 12 cannons

Casualties and losses
Total: 28 dead, 30 wounded	41 dead, 27 wounded, 11 missing and captured

The Battle of Cibakháza was one of the several battles for the bridge over the Tisza river from Cibakháza in the Hungarian war of Independence of 1848-1849, fought on 24 February 1849 between the Hungarian troops defending the bridge led by Major Károly Leiningen-Westerburg and the troops of the Austrian Empire, led by Major General Ferenc Ottinger, who were trying to capture and destroy it, in order to prevent the Hungarian incursions on the right bank of the river. The Hungarians defeated the Austrians, forcing Ottinger to retreat. The Hungarians managed to keep the bridge, which continued to remain a danger for the Austrian possessions on the right baank of the Tisza. One of the consequences of this thing was the Hungarian victory in the Second Battle of Szolnok in which, after crossing the bridge of Cibakháza, the Hungarian army surprised the Austrian garrison from Szolnok.

== Background ==
At the beginning of January 1849, the Austrian imperial main forces occupied Pest-Buda, and then pushed forward to the Tisza at several points. After this, the Hungarian revolutionary government retreated to East, and organized the defense of the Tisza line from Debrecen. It was then that the bridges at Tiszafüred, Szolnok and Cibakháza became crucial, as they could serve as the starting point for a future major counter-offensive. Around January 10, the National Defence Committee (the unofficial, but de facto Hungarian government led by Lajos Kossuth) called the people of Bihar, Szabolcs, Heves and Szolnok counties, the Jászkun and Hajdú districts to revolt to defend the Tisza line. The imperial commandment considered the war to be over after the successes achieved so far and expected a Hungarian surrender. This misconception was only dispelled by General Mór Perczel's attack on 22 January. After the victories in the First Battle of Szolnok and the Battle of Cegléd, Perczel's troops pushed forward toward Albertirsa. This caused quite a stir at the Buda headquarters of Field Marshal Alfred I, Prince of Windisch-Grätz.

For this reason, the possession of the bridges on the Tisza became important for the imperial command. The bridge at Cibakháza was initially defended by national guardsmen mobilized from the Tisza district of Heves and Szolnok counties, mainly from Mezőtúr, under the leadership of Major István Mesterházy (1811-1860), who were reinforced by national guardsmen from Nagykunság and a few field guns. On 28 January the imperial troops entered Szolnok, but the Hungarian possession of the Cibakháza bridge was a threat for the Szolnok garrison to be attacked from the flank and rear. Therefore, on 30 and 31 January, and on 1 and 2 February, attempts were made by the Austrians to occupy the bridge, but Mesterházy repulsed them relatively easily. Jelačić's forces launched a major attack on 4 February to take possession of the bridge. They attacked on Sunday, perhaps expecting to catch the Hungarians by surprise, but they were wrong. The imperial batteries were returned fire by the Hungarian guns, and within two hours they had managed to damage two guns and inflict considerable casualties on the Austrian Cuirassiers. The imperials then started to shoot at Cibakháza with Congreve rockets, setting fire to several houses. The National Guardsmen and the companies of the 48th Battalion prevented the more serious danger by quickly extinguishing the fires. In the meantime, two carpenters from Kecskemét managed to pick up the planks from the Tisza bridge "prepared for pedestrian passage", despite the hail of bullets of the Austrians. After the attack on 4 February, there was a temporary pause, which the Hungarians used for raiding, reconnaissance, and prisoner-taking. Mesterházy's horsemen were covering the passes from Tiszaföldvár, Vezseny, and Tiszainoka, and on 14 February 14 cuirassiers were captured at the vineyards of Tiszavárkony. On the 20th, Mesterházy personally led a reconnaissance towards Kecskemét.

== Prelude ==
The Hungarian forces in the Cibakháza-Tiszaföldvár area were soon reinforced. In the second half of the month, the 3rd Battalion of the 19th Schwarzenberg Infantry Regiment, two companies of the 3rd Battalion of the 52nd Franz Karl Infantry Regiment, the 65th Honvéd Battalion, the National Guard Battalion of Mezőtúr, a Jäger company and a sapper squadron, four companies of the 3rd Ferdinand Hussars Regiment, about three hundred insurgent cavalrymen, a six-pound infantry battery and half of a cavalry battery were stationed here. The Hungarian troops defending the bridge were composed as follows:

Veteran/regular soldiers:

- Infantry: 44 officers, 1,300 soldiers;
- Cavalry: 22 officers, 500 soldiers;
- Artillery: 15 officers, 200 soldiers;
- 17 cannons;
- Sappers: 1 officer, 300 soldiers;

Non regular honvéds:

- 65th (Kökényessy) battalion: 27 officers, 1,000 men;
- 1 cavalry company from Mezőtúr: 5 officers, 120 men;

Non regular national guards:

- Mezőtúr infantry battalion: 24 officers, 1,000 men with scythes;
- Free Cuman riders: 2 officers, 60 men;
- New rider squad from Kecskemét: 200 men;

Total: 140 officers, 4310 men, 17 cannons.

The existence of the bridge at Cibakháza was, therefore, the biggest source of problems for the Austrian I. Corps, stationing in the region. If this were no longer the case, Lieutenant Colonel Stauffer and his detachment could be withdrawn from Kecskemét, concentrating only on Szolnok and providing better support for the main army's slowly outlining and soon-to-be-launched attack towards Gyöngyös. The imperial command decided to destroy the bridge in the second half of February in order to prevent a Hungarian attack from the direction of Cibakháza. As early as 16 February, Jelačić had already drafted a measure to General Ferenc Ottinger to carry out another attempt against the Cibakháza bridge, which this time had to be destroyed to its foundations. In the meantime, the commander of the Ottinger cavalry brigade gathered new news and found that General Károly Vécsey's division was already at Törökszentmiklós, while General János Damjanich's was approaching Cibakháza. The appearance of the two divisions posed a simultaneous threat at both Szolnok and Cibakháza, so to ease the situation the destruction of the bridge from Cibakháza was now unavoidable. On 22 February Field Marshal Windisch-Grätz issued his order that the I Corps should continue to cover the Tisza crossings and, if the opportunity presented itself, destroy the bridge at Cibakháza. This order came as the Austrian main army was moving towards Gyöngyös to join up with Franz Schlik's corps and force the Hungarian army, which was believed to be near Mezőkövesd, into battle. For this, Jelačić also had to provide troops, a detached brigade led by General Zeisberg, the Chief of General Staff of the I Corps. At the Tisza crossings, however, there was still a significant force, but only with "defensive competence", with which Jelačić was not happy. The only option left for him, was to achieve some military success, was to destroy the bridge at Cibakháza.

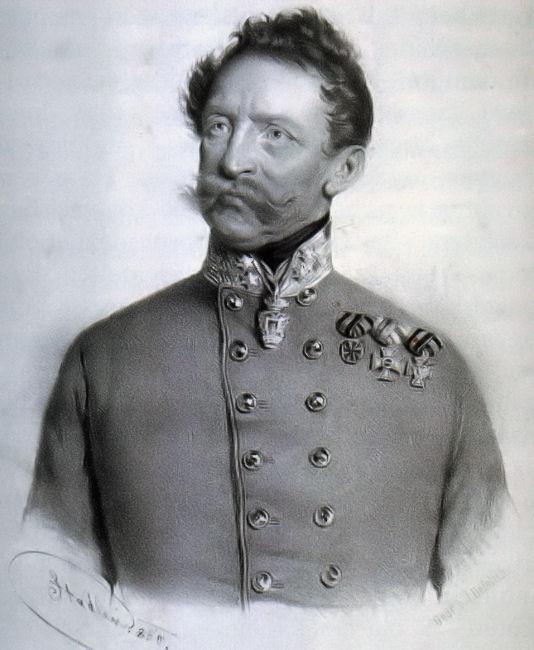
Ottinger Ferenc

So when Ottinger received the written order to attack the bridge from Cibakháza, and also Stauffer's troops were summoned from Kecskemét, so the organization of the "expedition" could begin.

On 23 February, Major General Ottinger assembled his troops in Abony destined to carry out the operation. The experience of the attack on 4 February showed that artillery alone could not succeed in this task and that it was necessary to capture the bridge so that it could be destroyed. Only the infantry could do this. At the same time, the artillery had to be reinforced, both to tie up the Hungarian artillery defending the bridge and to be numerous enough to make it possible to destroy the bridge with their fire if necessary. Therefore, use of heavy artillery seemed advisable.

Ottinger, the cavalry brigade commander assigned for this action six cavalry companies, three from each of the two regiments of his own brigade. On this day, around noon, two infantry battalions from the Karger Brigade arrived as reinforcements (the 3rd Battalion of the 3rd - Archduke Charles - Infantry Regiment and the 3rd Battalion of the 11th -2nd Banderial - Border Guard Regiment). Probably already in Abony was the 5th Cavalry Battery, which was joined by the 1st Twelve Pounder Battery, which, like the others, was part of the corps artillery reserve. Also arriving from the Army's Artillery Reserve was the 16th Congreve Rocket Battery. The Austrian troops under Ottinger were as it follows:

Infantry:

- 50 officers, 2,000 soldiers;

Cavalry:

- 36 officers, 960 soldiers;

Artillery:

- 6 officers, 200 soldiers, 12 cannons;

Total: 92 officers, 3,160 soldiers, and 12 cannons.

The march started towards Cibakháza at 10 o'clock in the evening. After a march of about 25 kilometers, they approached the mouth of the river loop at the entrance to the bridgehead from Cibakháza at around 5 in the morning.

== Battle ==
The column stopped at a farmhouse, where Ottinger began to organize the surprise attack.

The surprise was not to be, however, because their vanguard almost immediately got into a fight with a Hungarian hussar patrol. The Hungarian cavalry retreated after a short battle with the cuirassiers, and the whole Austrian detachment followed them.

On reaching the river, in the short portion between the two close-to-each-other bends of the river, in a defensive position behind a bank of earth, Hungarian infantrymen, presumably with at least one light gun, were standing waiting for the attack. In the foggy, damp weather, they began firing blindly, sending a signal to the Cibakháza garrison, and causing the Imperials to deploy, thus slowing them down.

After a short exchange of fire, the Hungarians abandoned their positions and retreated to the bridge, giving Ottinger the possibility to form his troops. This was done in spite of heavy enemy fire. Before sunrise, the detachment took up battle position and headed for the bridge. The two batteries moved into a wide area to the right of the causeway, escorted and covered by the cavalry. This area was usually swampy, but on this occasion, it proved passable, as no rain had fallen for a long time before. The batteries approached the bridge at 1,000-1,500 paces and then took up a firing position. Behind them, in a regular, probably double line, deployed the cuirassier columns. The infantry marched under cover of the dam, two or three squadrons per battalion, accompanied by three rocket stands. Another two squadrons and a half rocket battery were left in reserve at the farm mentioned earlier. The battalions marched towards the bridge in battle order, which meant sending out a line of skirmishers formed by border guards, followed by the reserve of skirmishers in a column, and then the other companies in platoon columns. In the open formation of the skirmish line, the most effective were the snipers who were among the border guards. Sniper training was given to a select crew of border guards, who were equipped with a more modern, chambered rifle. With this, it could be fired more accurately and farther than with conventional smoothbore rifles. Their task was to approach the enemy and, if possible, destroy him with targeted fire and force him into cover. The 13th company of the Archduke Charles Battalion, which formed the battalion's vanguard, advanced behind the skirmishers. The march of the infantry, which lasted several hours, was occasionally disrupted by hussars, but not with much conviction: merely to gain time. The Hungarian Honvéd infantry was positioned on the high, left bank of the Tisza, near the bridge, with the artillery on its left. Some of the Hungarian guns, the so-called positional guns, were behind entrenchments on the high left bank of the Tisza. They had a longer range than the twelve-pounders of the Austrians and were in a much better position. These guns were firing directly at the bridge and the territory before the bridge.

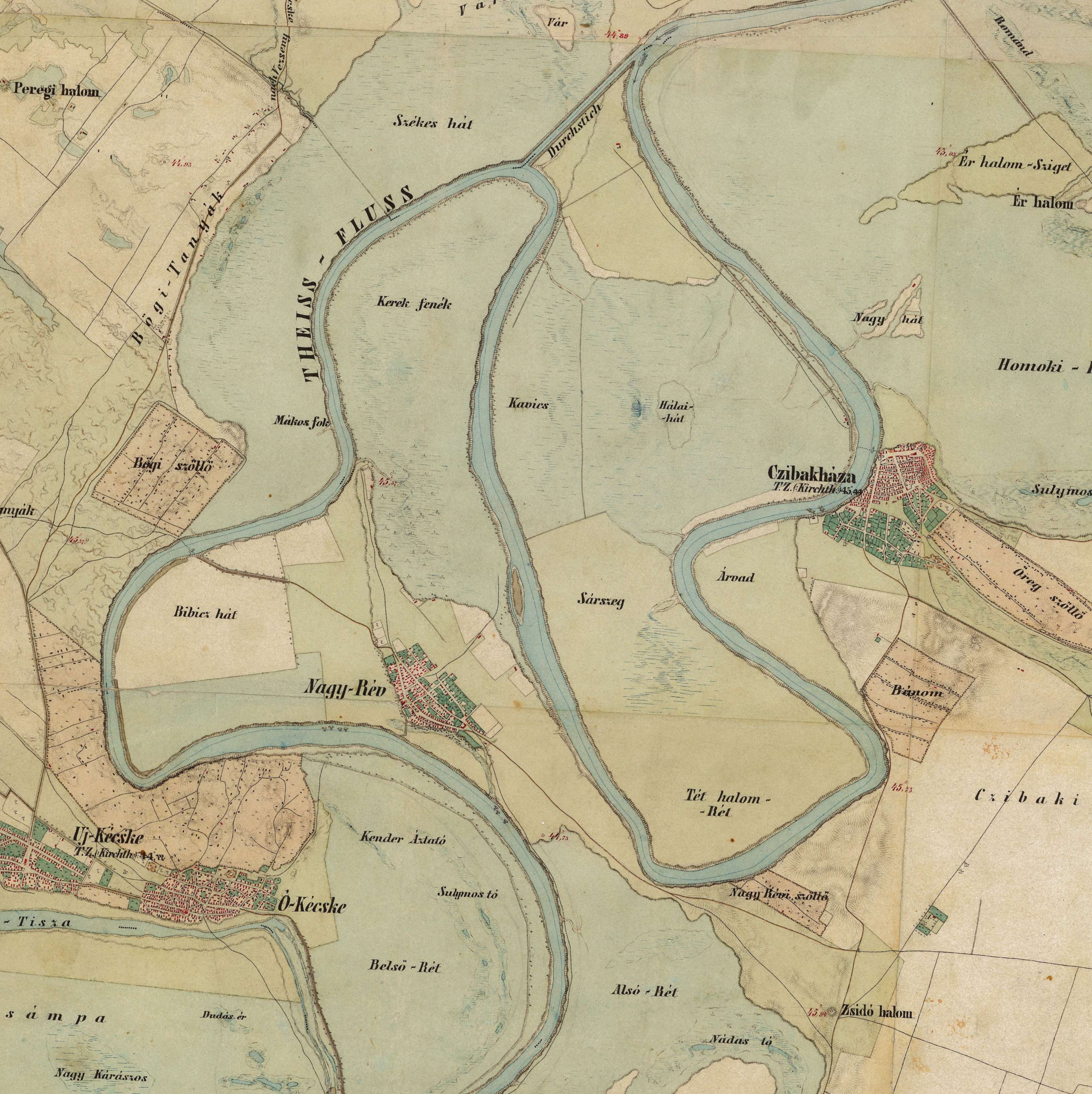
Map of Cibakháza and the Tisza-bend after 1850. In 1849 the mouth of the Tisza loop was not yet closed with a ditch

The fog lifted at about 8 o'clock, and then the imperial batteries started to shoot. But their cannonballs did not reach the other bank of the river. As the Hungarian artillery did not answer the shots, the enemy's guns were twice pushed forward. It was then that the Hungarian artillerymen too started firing, which resulted in a fierce exchange of fire. However, although the imperial artillerymen fired for hours with the greatest possible effort, the Hungarian guns behind the entrenchments suffered almost no damage. The Austrian Congreve rockets also joined in the artillery duel, but they neither could do more harm. On the other hand, the Hungarian artillery inflicted significant losses on the enemy, who soon retreated behind the Tisza dam. During the long hours of firing, the Hungarian infantry covering the bridge also began to make the bridge unusable for the Austrians to cross it, an unexpected turn of events that Ottinger had to act on immediately. If he wanted to capture the bridge, he could not delay the attack of the infantry any longer. However, it did not manage to silence the enemy's artillery, which would have been a prerequisite for this to have a real chance of success. Moreover, the fact that the opposite bank was "swarming" with Hungarian infantry, also hurt the chances of success in this matter. Despite all these Ottinger decided to attack, which was hurried also by a report from the commanders of the artillery that they were running out of ammunition. Ottinger tried to embolden his infantry in this attack by personally being next to them in the first line.

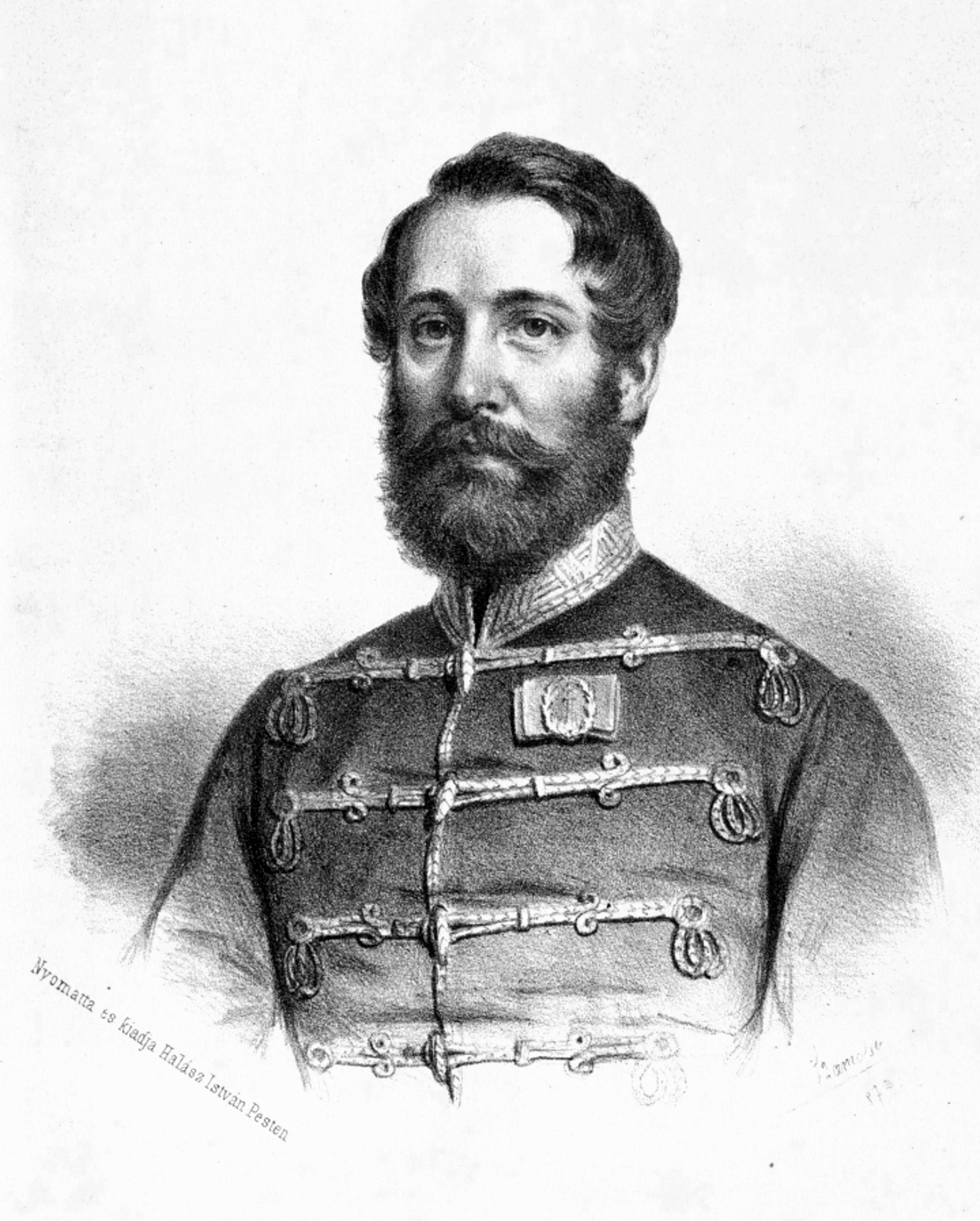
Leiningen-Westerburg Károly Szamossy

The battalion commanders, at the head of their columns, led the attack advancing along the dam, covered by the skirmishers, who, after pushing to the river bank, tried to find covered but suitable positions for shooting, and the Congreve rockets. The band of the Archduke Charles Infantry Regiment, which was particularly needed to boost the enthusiasm of the rookie soldiers of their regiment, played military marches.

The Hungarian gunners, abandoning the artillery duel, started firing grapeshot at the Austrian assaulting columns, which tried to advance under the cover provided by the dam and the alone standing houses, and thus advance, step by step, as far as possible. When they reached the bridge, they were a better target, although they were helped by the houses, the tree line, and the willows. From here, however, their rifle fire was dangerous for the gunners. In a terrible crossfire, with the planks removed, the bridge was almost unpassable. In vain was the example set, the officers recklessly leading the attack, the guns firing from close proximity, which enabled them to shoot in the most optimal way from these positions, the determined attempt to capture the bridge was thwarted. In the Hungarian cannon fire, which managed to disable two enemy guns, the imperial attacks collapsed. The Imperial infantry, however, could not retreat because of the cuirassiers positioned behind them. Mesterházy, who was leading the Hungarians, was wounded by a cannonball, and the command was taken over by the commander of the 19th Battalion, Major Károly Leiningen-Westerburg (1819-1849). Leiningen led a general assault, then suddenly one or two Hungarian guns started firing from the rear of the Imperial troops from the direction of Nagyrév. This caused panic among the Imperial cuirassiers, and Ottinger ordered a retreat. The batteries and cavalry immediately executed the order, abandoned their positions and marched back to the point of departure. The infantry, however, had a much harder job, as they had to retreat under constant fire. Some groups were slow to take cover in the rear, others could barely leave their positions, and some were completely cut off from their comrades by the fire. Meanwhile, the counterattack of the defenders was developing, in which the soldiers of the Hungarian 19th (Schwarzenberg) and 52nd (Franz Karl) Infantry Regiments, formerly part of the regiments of the Imperial Army, charged, led by Major Károly Leiningen-Westerburg himself. However, the soldiers jumping over the bridge piles and beams just ran into the Austrian soldiers remaining around the buildings on the other side. To complicate matters, the infantrymen from both the Archduke Charles and Schwarzenberg Regiments wore uniforms very similar to those of the Austrians. Leiningen, who was charging in front of his soldiers, was deceived by the uniform of the Imperial Charles Line Infantry Regiment and was captured by the Austrian soldiers. The Imperials took Leiningen to the Csuhaj tavern near the bridge and treated him rather rudely. At the news, the crossing Hungarians, led by Lieutenant Mátyás Talabér (1812-1884) and Lieutenant Sándor Illésy (1830-1886), stormed the building, which was defended by about thirty imperials. After a brief struggle, they managed to break into the tavern and free their commander. This time, the Austrians trapped inside were captured by them. This effectively ended the battle, the Hungarians did not pursue. The next day, Leiningen, who did not speak Hungarian, paid his respects to the soldiers who died heroically in the battle with a speech written by him in German, translated by somebody in Hungarian, then memorized by him. The memory of the fighting for the bridge and the fallen is preserved in the Memorial of the Battle, inaugurated in 1906.

== Aftermath ==
In the battle, the most important part was played by the artillery. The Hungarian artillery proved to be a very formidable opponent to the imperial artillery. Besides the Hungarian cannons from the left bank of the river and near the bridge, a very important part was played by the Hungarian cannons sent to Nagyrév, which attacked the Austrians from the rear and sides. Both Mesterházy and Leiningen consider this as decisive for the Hungarian victory.

The battle resulted in significant losses for the Austrians. Two officers were killed in the fierce fighting at the bridgehead. It was probably on the bridge that Lieutenant Stefan Digby, a British-born first lieutenant who was Lieutenant-General Hartlieb's commanding officer and had volunteered for this operation, was hit by grapeshot. The other officer victim was Lieutenant Joseph Jovanovic, the same age as Digby. In addition to them, 39 Austrians were killed, 27 wounded, and 11 missing or captured.

After the battle was over, Ottinger assembled his troops at the point of departure, and at 1 o'clock in the afternoon, they turned back to Abony, where they arrived around 8 o'clock in the evening.

Thus, Major General Ottinger was unable to carry out the army commander's orders. Surprise, as a prerequisite for success, was hardly an option this time, the geographical conditions and the dense, well-organised patrol system carried out by the Hussars precluded it.

The Major General's idea was to silence the Hungarian artillery with his artillery, then the infantry would take the bridge - in the most optimal situation also the town - and then completely destroy the bridge. However, the attempt failed when it became clear that the imperial artillery could not even disturb the Hungarian guns. This would have required more batteries, but the corps had only two twelve-pounder batteries. An infantry attack under these circumstances was in fact a reckless undertaking. Ottinger put all his eggs in one basket, and still he could not succeed in taking the bridge. He would have liked to hurry things along, for in this place, which could be considered a peninsula, he could not feel safe for a moment. It is no wonder that his reserves were not intended to support the troops but to secure his retreat. So he quickly gave up his goal and hurriedly retreated.

Ottinger's failure did not have any serious consequences, because Windisch-Grätz was busy with something else. With the bulk of his army, he moved towards Gyöngyös, and during the Battle of Kápolna, he actually united with Lieutenant General Schlik's corps and defeated the Hungarian army led by Lieutenant General Henryk Dembiński. After the victory of 26–27 February and the less successful pursuit (the defeat in the Battle of Mezőkövesd), Windisch-Grätz halted further operations for the time being and withdrew his troops. By 1 March he had already decided to concentrate his forces between Cegléd and Pest to repel a possible attack from Szolnok. The still intact and heavily guarded bridge at Cibakháza must have reinforced his fear of a Hungarian attack.

Although the Austrian troops were slowly retreating to the Kecskemét-Cegléd-Jászberény line, they did not make the slightest effort to cover the crossings. On 17 February, they had completed the construction of the bridgehead at Szolnok on the left bank of the Tisza, which, with heavy artillery and some troops, was considered sufficient to hold this important military position.

The Gramont Brigade, which defended the city until then, was replaced at the end of February by the Karger Brigade, which was also belonging to the I Corps. Behind it, in Abony, the Ottinger Brigade was stationed, but there were necessary several hours - even in case of an alarm sent through the railway - to support the brigade in Szolnok. Cibakháza continued to be watched by occasional patrols, and a company of the Wallmoden Cuirassiers under the command of Captain Friedrich Stang was again directed to Nagykőrös.

Captain Stang performed his duties with diligence, and although he was a long way from Cibakháza, he sent a very remarkable report directly to Lieutenant General Hartlieb, his division commander, on 3 March. According to his report, the Damjanich division was clearly massing troops at Cibakháza, preparing to cross the river, and the 4,600 wagons ordered there also indicated that they intends to make a long march. But despite the captain's excellent and alarming report, neither Hartlieb, nor Ottinger, who was eager for a revanche, nor even Jelačić did anything to check the news, and take any measures.

And disaster has struck indeed. Largely in full view of the imperial army, on the night of 4 March, the Damjanich Division marched unhindered across the Cibakháza bridge and defeated the Karger Brigade in the Second Battle of Szolnok on the 5th.

== Sources ==
- Bagi, Gábor (2007), Cibakháza. Száz magyar falu ("Cibakháza. Bookhouse of Hundred Hungarian Villages") (in Hungarian)
- Csikány, Tamás (2003), "A cibakházi híd 1849. A cibakházi hídért 1849. január–márciusában folytatott harcok katonai irataiból ("The Bridge from Cibakháza 1849. From the Military Documents about the Battles for the Bridge of Cibakháza fought in January-March 1849")", Hadtörténelmi Levéltári Kiadványok (in Hungarian)
