= Battle of Káty =

Battle of the Hungarian War of Independence

Coordinates: 45°18′55.2″N 19°56′31.6″E

- Part of the Hungarian Revolution of 1848
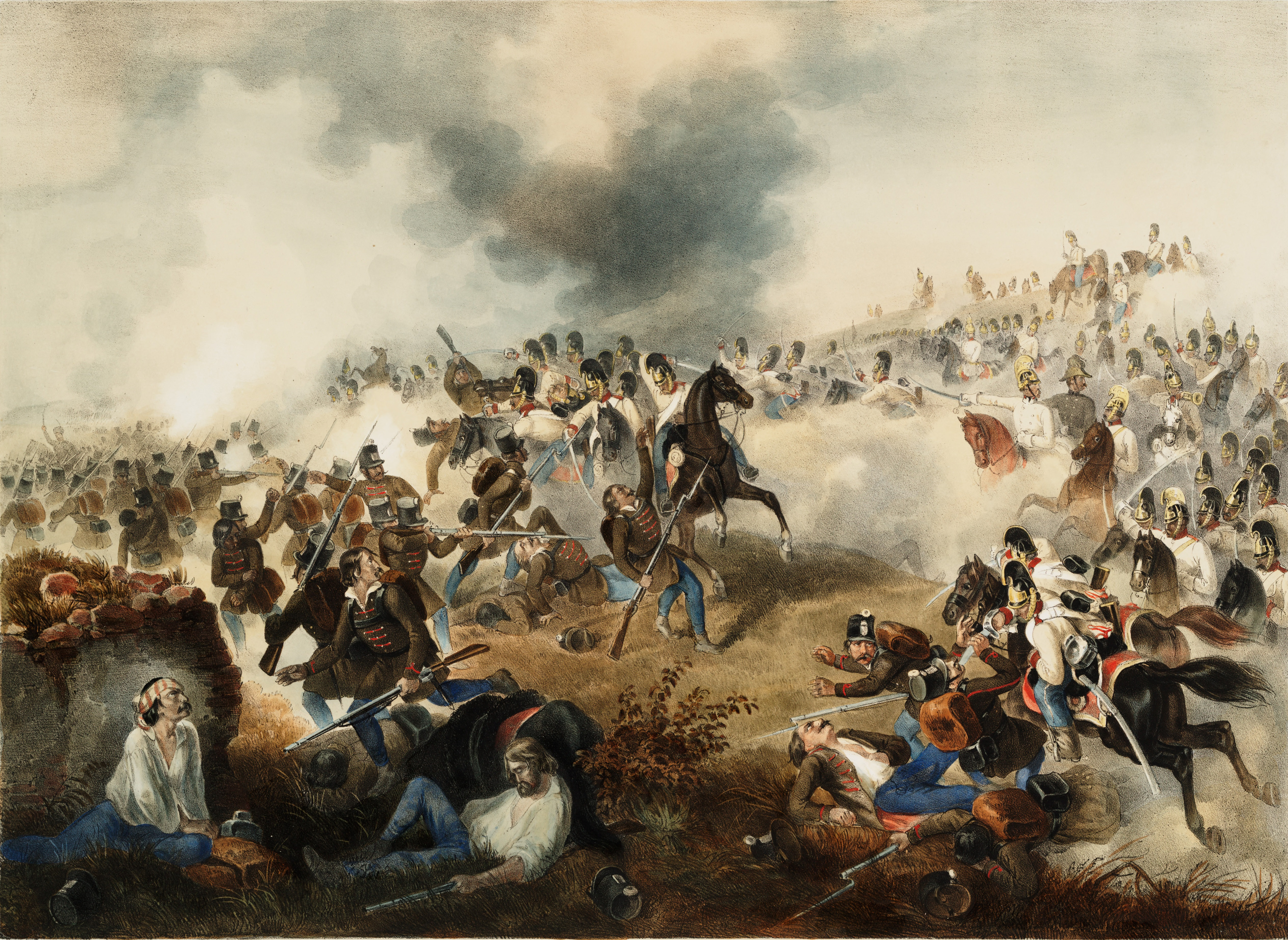
- Battle of Káty
Date	7 June 1849
Location	Káty, Kingdom of Hungary
Result	Austro-Croatian victory

Belligerents
Hungarian Revolutionary Army	Austrian Empire: Croatia

Commanders and leaders
Mór Perczel	Josip Jelačić; Ferenc Ottinger

Strength
Total: 8,298+? 30 cannons Did not participate: 2,926+? 6 cannons	Total: 8,154; 18 cannons Did not participate: 4,196+? 6 cannons

Casualties and losses
Total: 300–400 prisoners (according to Perczel); 500–600 dead 200 wounded; in total 1,500–3,000 (according to Jelačić and Ottinger)	Total: 10–12

The Battle of Káty was fought on 7 June 1849 between the Hungarian IV Corps, led by General Mór Perczel, and the Austrian and Croatian soldiers of the Southern Army, led by the Ban of Croatia, Lieutenant Field Marshal Josip Jelačić. It was part of the fight for southern Hungary, consisting of the Bácska and Bánság provinces, and formed part of the Summer Campaign of the 1848–1849 Hungarian Revolution and War of Independence. Fought between two equally sized armies, the battle ended in a nearly catastrophic defeat for the Hungarians, who failed to occupy the southern regions and lost the initiative they had gained in the Spring Campaign. However, after the battle, Jelačić did not exploit his victory by attempting to crush the weakened Hungarians; instead, he retreated, enabling them to reorganize.

== Background ==
As a result of the string of victories won by the Hungarian army under General Artúr Görgei in the Spring Campaign, the Austrian army, which by the end of March controlled western and central Hungary, with the Tisza river as the front line was forced to retreat to the western frontier of Hungary in order to defend Vienna from a possible Hungarian attack. While the bulk of the Austrian troops retreated westward, the Ban of Croatia, Lieutenant Field Marshal Josip Jelačić, was ordered by the new commander of the Austrian forces in Hungary, Field Marshal Ludwig von Welden, to march with the I Corps, consisting of 12,500 soldiers and 54 cannons, to southern Hungary in order to support the Serbian insurgents, who were on the brink of being totally crushed by the Hungarian armies operating in southern Hungary under General Mór Perczel and General Józef Bem.

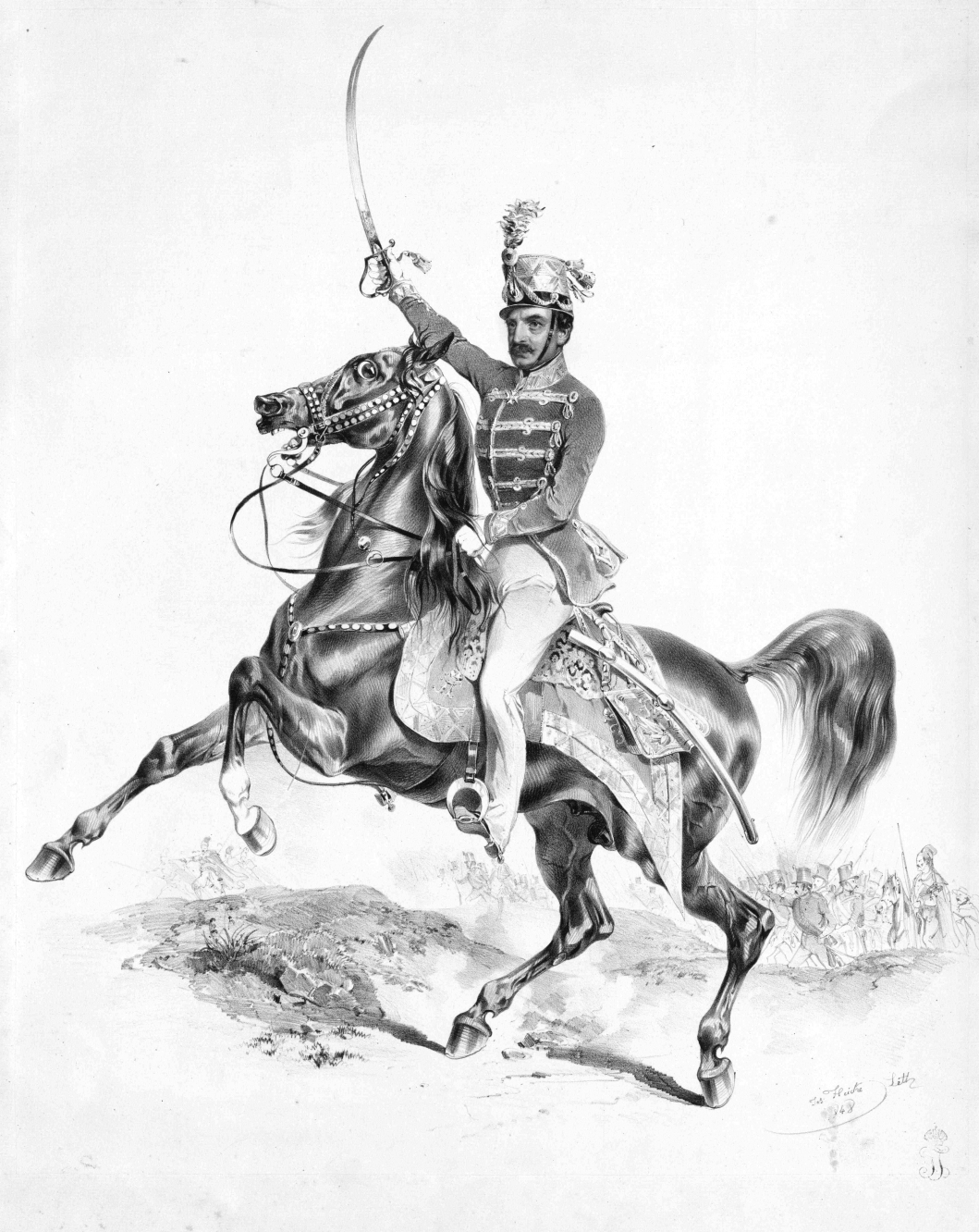
Josip Jelačić

Jelačić began his march on 24 April, following the course of the Danube from Pest towards southern Hungary. His supply ships carrying the heavy weapons arrived at Eszék the next day. On 10 May, Jelačić arrived with the I Corps at Eszék, and he began to form the so-called Southern Army from the Austrian, Croatian, and Serbian units found in southern Hungary. These troops consisted of two separate parts. One, the mobile or field troops, consisted of three infantry divisions, one cavalry division, and an artillery reserve, numbering 33,700 soldiers (of whom 4,400 were cavalrymen) and 137 cannons, while the other was the siege corps, consisting of 10,400 soldiers and 51 cannons, which besieged the fortress of Pétervárad, held by the Hungarians. Jelačić consolidated the Serbian, Croatian, and Austrian troops after two months of continuous defeats and retreats suffered against the Hungarian troops during the Spring Campaign. First he reinforced the Austrian siege corps besieging the fortress of Pétervárad from the south, then he began to plan an attack against the troops of Mór Perczel. The Hungarian commander received an order from the Defence Ministry that, according to the new national military plan, he had to send his 12,000 soldiers to the Upper Danube to help the Hungarian main army under General Artúr Görgei defeat the Austrian armies led by Field Marshal Julius Jacob von Haynau. Perczel did not agree with this plan, thinking that instead of decreasing his army, he should be reinforced with more troops. On 22, 24, and 26 May, Perczel tried to occupy the trenches of Titel, the last Serbian stronghold on the northern shore of the Danube, but his troops' charges were repelled by the enemy, who used the excellent defensive positions behind the swampy area. When, on 31 May, the troops of Jelačić arrived near Titel, Perczel retreated to Újvidék. On 4 June, Perczel tried to break the Austrian blockade on the southern side of Pétervárad, but the intervention of Jelačić's troops prevented this.

== Prelude ==
After these smaller victories against Perczel's attacks, Jelačić decided to go on the offensive, so he ordered his troops to advance from the Titel plateau to Bácska. On 6 July, Perczel received the report that Jelačić's troops had occupied Káty, Kovilszentiván, Gyurgyevó, and Zsablya, and immediately ordered his troops, stationed at Újvidék, to march there in three columns. The Hungarian troops began their march during the night of 6–7 July. The first column, led by Colonel László Gál, marched on the Újvidék–Káty road; the brigade led by Perczel himself went towards the Káty woods, with the cavalry brigade designated as the reserve; and the brigade led by Major Antal Czintula marched from Csúrog to Zsablya, hoping to attack Jelačić's right wing and rearguard.

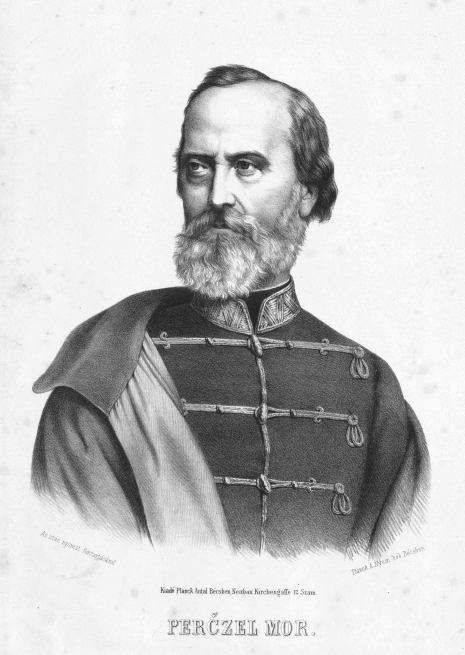
Perczel Mór

The Ban of Croatia placed the Grammont infantry brigade in Káty and the Ottinger cavalry division in the Káty forest.

In the battle, Perczel could count on 29½ (+ ?) infantry companies, 618 (+ ?) horses, and 24 cannons—that is, 5,372 (+ ?) soldiers. Twenty-six infantry companies, 456 (+ ?) horses, and 6 cannons did not participate directly, amounting to 2,926 (+ ?) soldiers. A significant part of Perczel's troops were composed of weak volunteer and national guard troops, both on foot and on horseback.

Only about half of Jelačić's army corps, mostly the cavalry, was present on the battlefield on 7 June 1849: ? infantry companies, 26 cavalry companies, and 12 cannons—that is, 3,958 soldiers and 3,850 horses. Thirty infantry companies, 2 cavalry companies (359 horses), and 6 cannons did not participate, amounting to 4,196 soldiers.

== Battle ==
The Gál brigade arrived first at the future battlefield, where, after a short cannonade, it retreated, waiting for Perczel's troops to arrive. Perczel arrived between 4:00 and 5:00 a.m. in front of the Káty forest and immediately ordered his artillery to deploy and fire at the Austrian outposts from the wood. At first, Lieutenant General Ferenc Ottinger responded only with a cavalry battery, positioning three cavalry companies there to protect the guns, while behind the forest, far from Perczel's eyes, he organized the rest of his troops to attack.

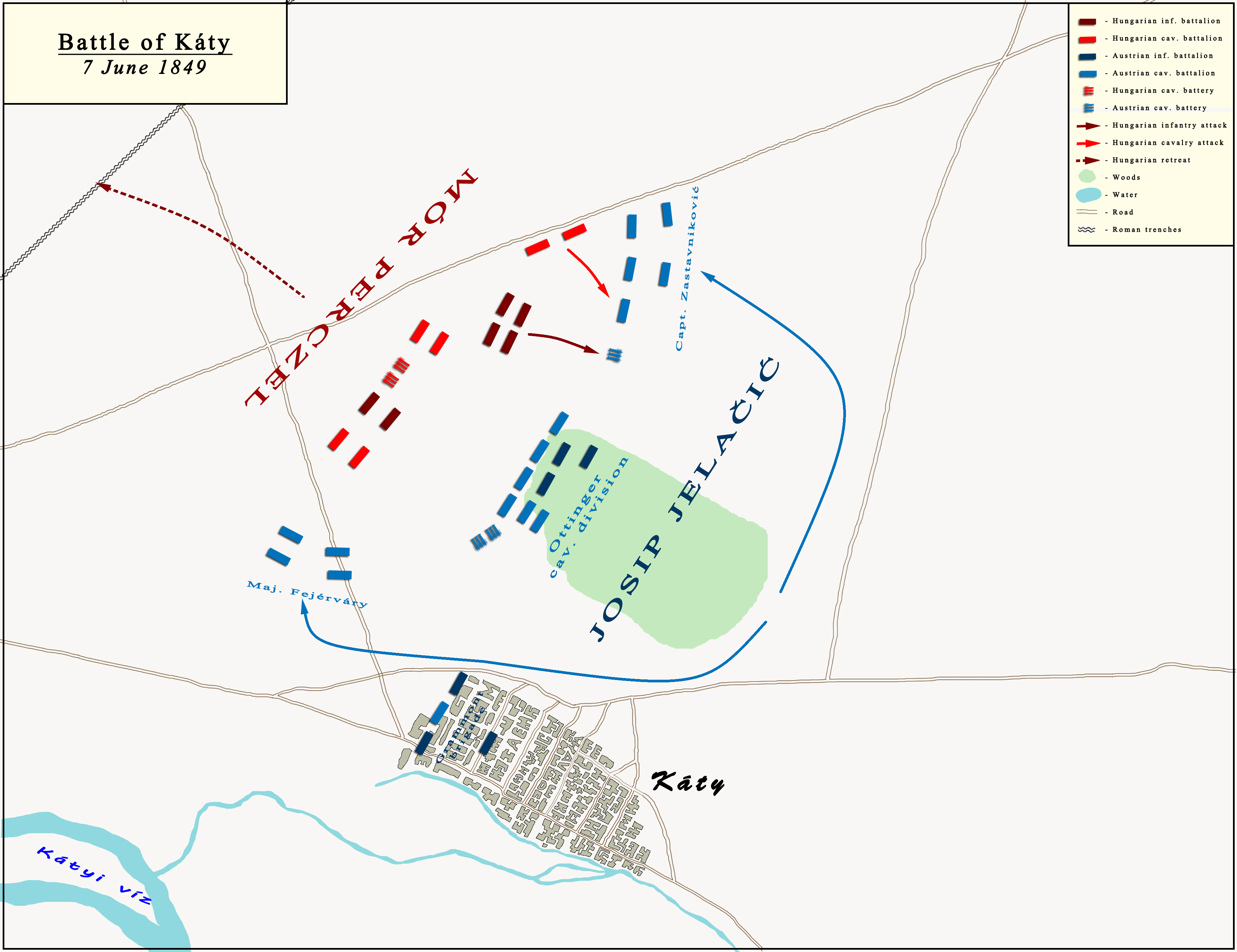
Battle of Káty 7 June 1849

During the cannonade, Perczel attempted a flanking maneuver, ordering his infantry and cavalry to encircle Ottinger's right wing. Seeing this, Ottinger ordered his cavalry to attack. While Ottinger, leading a cuirassier and a Dragoon regiment, tried to distract the Hungarians' attention from the front, Major General József Fejérváry attacked the left wing of Perczel's troops with 4 Cuirassier companies, 2 Lancer companies, and a cavalry battery, while Captain Gideon Ritter von Zastavniković directed 5 Cuirassier companies and a half cavalry battery against the right wing. The combined cavalry attack was devastating because it struck the Hungarians from the side, right during their flanking march. First the artillerymen, left without protection, began to rout towards Újvidék, followed by the cavalry; when Ottinger went on the attack against the infantry, this too began to flee. Only two companies of the 3rd (Ferdinand) Hussar Regiment tried to cover the fleeing soldiers, but they had no chance against an enemy four times their size, even if all five Hungarian Hussar companies had fought to their deaths. The Hungarian defeat could have been even greater if Major General Franz Adam Freiherr Grammont von Linthal had attacked too. Luckily for the Hungarians, the brigade stationed in Káty failed to participate in the battle, because when Grammont was marching towards the battlefield and heard the sound of the cannons, he retreated back to the village, fearing that he would be cut off from the rest of the Austrian troops.

Four dragoon and two cuirassier companies led by Colonel Sternberg reached from behind, at the so-called Roman trenches, the 8th Hungarian Battalion and a battalion of the 62nd Hungarian Infantry Regiment, and crushed them completely. The soldiers of the 8th Battalion almost became prisoners, but they were saved by the Hussars of the Hunyadi Hussar Regiment. In the fight, the leader of the battalion, Major Boldizsár Barcza, was wounded. The latter even reported to Perczel, in an exaggerated way, that his battalion had been completely annihilated. Those who suffered most from the Austrian attack were the 8th Battalion, which was crushed; the 41st Battalion, half of whose soldiers were wounded; and the battalion of the 62nd Hungarian Infantry Regiment, which also suffered serious losses. The exact losses are unknown: Perczel always minimized them, while Jelačić overstated them.

== Aftermath ==
In this battle, General Mór Perczel demonstrated many times that he did not lack strategic intuition and was very courageous, but he was not well trained from a tactical point of view. This explains why Perczel, who won many victories against the Serbian insurgents or inferior Austrian troops, tended to rely on his intuition and self-awareness alone when faced with an uncommon combat task, such as a force of superior quality to his own, and subsequently failed several times. That is how he managed to "step into the same river" twice during the War of Independence: after being defeated by Jelačić in the Battle of Mór on 30 December 1848, he was defeated by the same general six months later in a quite similar way. On both occasions, he was defeated by opposing K.u.k. troops in a way that could have been prevented by more thorough reconnaissance or by ordering a retreat in time, but he was tactically defeated on the battlefield. What makes the story even more interesting is that Lieutenant-General Ferenc Ottinger's cavalry, which played a key role in the Battle of Mór, was also the element that decided the outcome of the Battle of Káty.

After this defeat, the Hungarian high command in Pest understood that sending Hungarian reinforcements from the southern front to western Hungary was out of the question, because the Hungarian lines in the region could then easily crumble. Perczel, who had long been asking for dismissal from command of the IV Corps, received acceptance of his resignation. He handed over command of his troops to Colonel Ágoston Tóth and then went to the capital. The new commander retreated the weakened Hungarian troops behind the Ferenc Canal (Ferenc csatorna / K.K. Franzens Schiffahrts Canal). However, Jelačić did not profit from his victory and the precarious situation of the Hungarian army; instead, he attacked Újvidék, trying to blockade the fortress of Pétervárad from the north, but the town and the Danube bridgehead repelled his attacks. Only after this failure did he attack, on 25 July, the troops of Colonel Tóth at Óbecse, forcing him to retreat to the eastern banks of the Tisza. Here again he committed the same mistake as after the Battle of Káty: instead of continuing his attack towards Szeged, he retreated to the Ferenc Canal. This gave the Hungarians the chance to reorganize their forces and to endanger all the successes he had achieved.

== Sources ==
- Bánlaky, József (2001). A magyar nemzet hadtörténelme ("The Military History of the Hungarian Nation) (in Hungarian). Budapest: Arcanum Adatbázis.
- Bóna, Gábor (1987). Tábornokok és törzstisztek a szabadságharcban 1848–49 ("Generals and Staff Officers in the War of Freedom 1848–1849") (in Hungarian). Budapest: Zrínyi Katonai Kiadó. p. 430. ISBN 963-326-343-3.
- Hermann, Róbert (2001), 1848-1849 a szabadságharc hadtörténete ("Military History of 1848-1849") (in Hungarian), Budapest: Korona, ISBN 963-9376-21-3
- Hermann, Róbert (2004). Az 1848–1849-es szabadságharc nagy csatái ("Great battles of the Hungarian Revolution of 1848-1849") (in Hungarian). Budapest: Zrínyi. p. 408. ISBN 963-327-367-6.
- Hermann, Róbert (2011), "Perczel Mór dunántúli hadjárata és a móri ütközet ("The Transdanubian campaign of Mór Perczel and the Battle of Mór")" (PDF), Aetas 2001 (volume 16, nr. 2) (in Hungarian)
- Olchváry, Ödön (1999). A magyar függetlenségi harc 1848-1849-ben a Délvidéken (in Hungarian). Budapest: Márkus Samu Könyvnyomdája.
