= Battle of Moson =

Battle during Hungarian Revolution of 1848

Coordinates: 47°52′20.1″N 17°15′07.3″E

- Part of the Hungarian Revolution of 1848
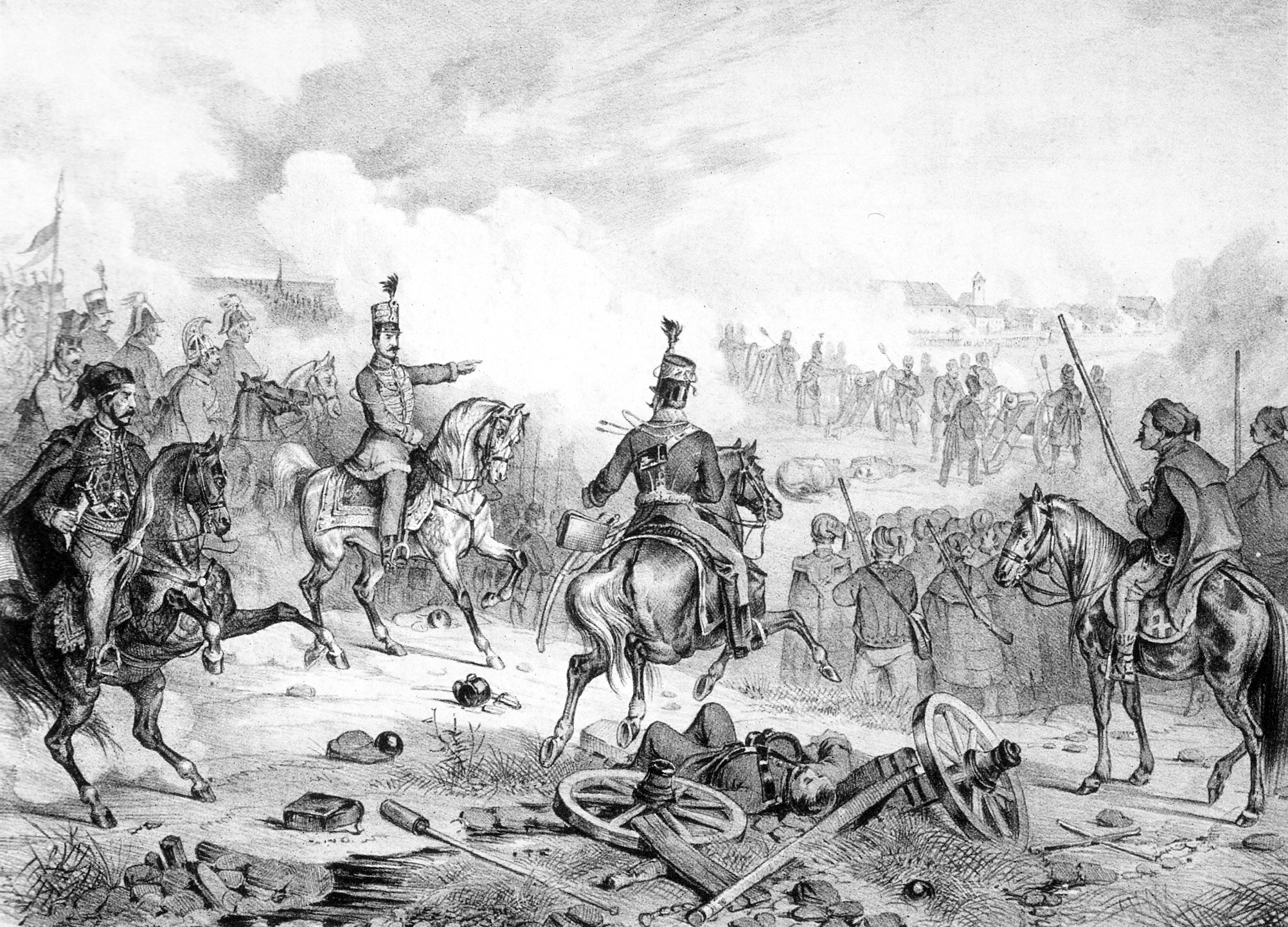
- "The Battle of Moson" (Armee Bulletin III)
Date	18 December 1848
Location	Mosonmagyaróvár, Moson County, Kingdom of Hungary
Result	Hungarian victory

Belligerents
Hungarian Revolutionary Army	Austrian Empire

Commanders and leaders
Artúr Görgei	Josip Jelačić

Strength
~1,000 men 1 ½ batteries	~1,000 men 2 batteries

Casualties and losses
0	Many men dead 1 man captured many horses killed

The Battle of Moson was a battle in the Hungarian war of Independence of 1848-1849, fought on 30 October 1848 between the cavalry of the Hungarian revolutionary Army led by General Artúr Görgei against the cavalry of the Austrian Empire led by Lieutenant General Josip Jelačić, wanted to attack the retreating Hungarian main army. Görgei's artillery and hussars put the Austrian cavalry to flight, then continued their retreat to Győr.

== Prelude ==
On 14 December 1848, the imperial army led by the Austrian Field Marshal Alfred I, Prince of Windisch-Grätz began its attack against Hungary. After the Battle of Parndorf, the Hungarian main forces led by General Artúr Görgei retreated eastwards. After this, on 16 December the main units of the Austrian army advanced to the following locations: Lieutenant General Josip Jelačić's corps moved into the areas marked by Miklóshalma-Kazimir-Boldogasszony -Féltorony; the Ottinger cavalry brigade occupied Oroszvár and Németjárfalu; the Neustädter Brigade reached Köpcsény and the bridgehead on the right bank of the Danube at Pozsony, the Liebler Brigade with its artillery reserves reached Prellenkirchen, and finally Schwarzenberg's division took up quarters in and around Lajtakáta. On 17 December, these army corps rested in their occupied positions. At 9 o'clock on the morning of 18 December, Jelačić, with 6 companies and 2 cavalry batteries set out on a forced reconnaissance towards Moson and Magyaróvár (today they form together the town of Mosonmagyaróvár).

Görgei sent his infantry and artillery to Győr on the 17th, while he himself stayed in Moson for the time being to cover the retreat with the cavalry. However, as the enemy had not shown itself even on the morning of the 18th, he sent half of his cavalry after the artillery and infantry. However, barely half an hour after their departure, the remaining half of Görgei's became aware of an enemy cavalry column approaching from the west. Although he did not want initially to engage in battle, Görgei knew that he had no choice but to repulse the enemy, then to continue his retreat unhindered. He therefore immediately called back the half of the cavalry that had already left, positioning them in the rear to serve as reserves in the battle that was about to begin. In the battle Görgei was able to deploy 1,000 hussars and 1 ½ batteries against a similar number of enemy cavalry and two batteries.

The towns of Magyóvár and Moson were surrounded by a canal from the west and south. The Hungarian cavalry was camped between it and the two towns, while the enemy was approaching on the other side of the canal. All the bridges of the canal had been demolished, except one, which led east of the Hungarian camp towards Győr, in the direction of the Hungarian troops' retreat.

== Battle ==
At first, the Austrian cavalry headed straight for the part of the canal in front of the Hungarian front line, but then a few cannon shots forced them to change direction. The Austrians turned south and continued their advance, taking a wide detour in the direction of the Hungarian retreat.

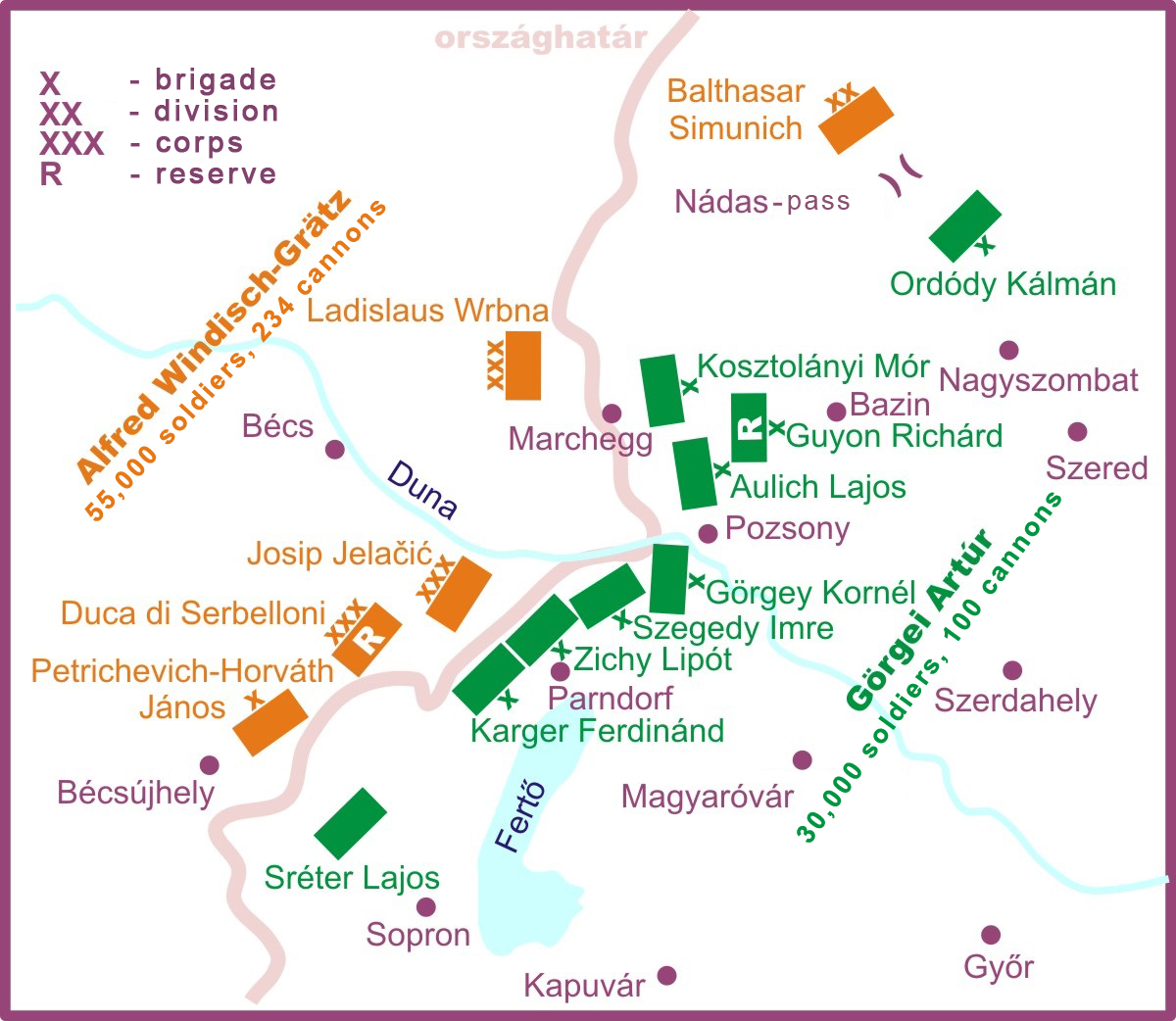
Start of the Austrian attack against Hungary

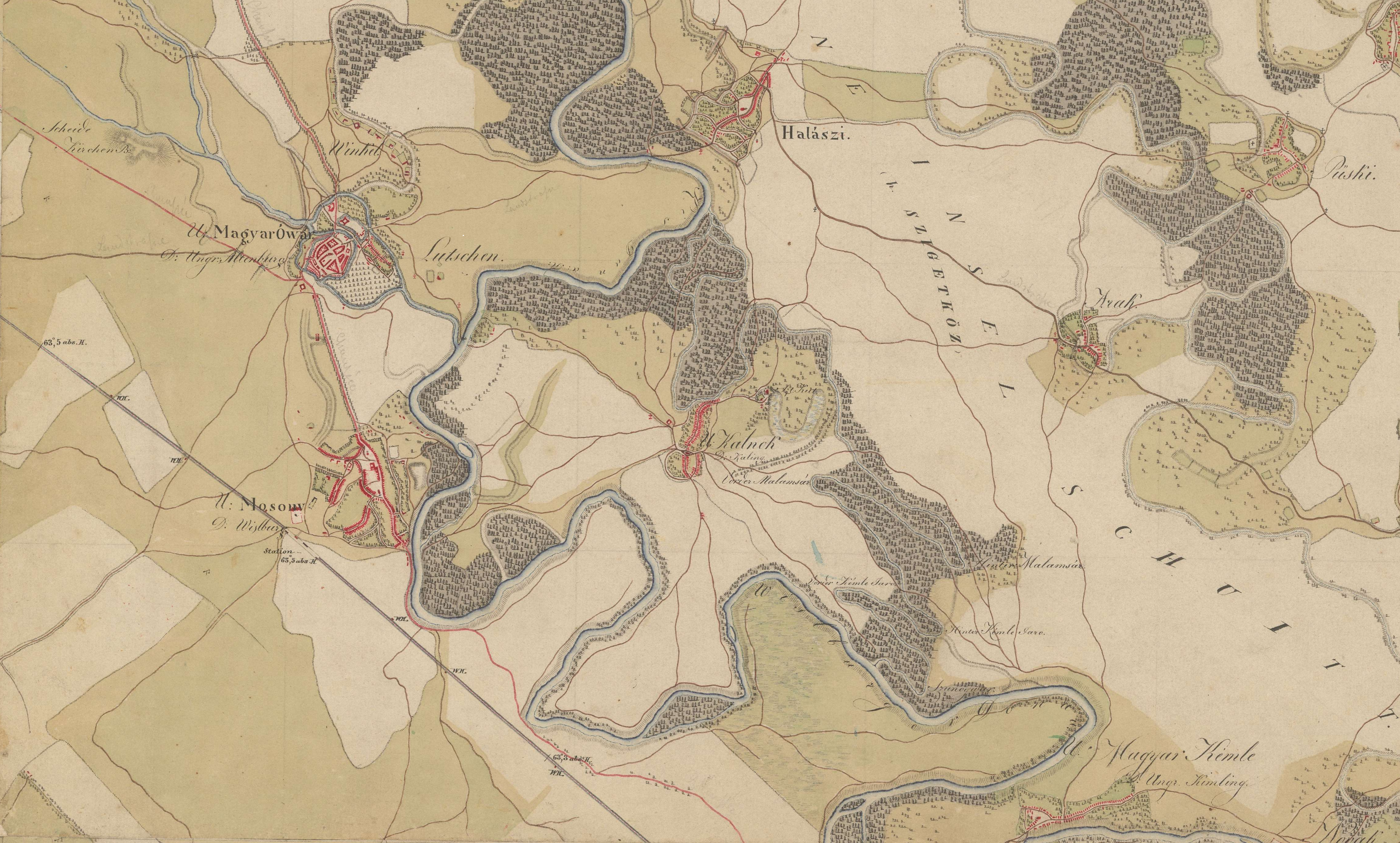
Moson and its surroundings in the first half of the 19th century - Hungary (1819–1869) - Second military survey of the Habsburg Empire

According to Görgei, it would have been easier to overtake the enemy on the shorter line, over the bridge mentioned above, on the main road leading to Győr, so that the Hungarian army could not be caught up or forced to accept battle, but Görgei did not want to create an even greater depression in the army by another retreat without fighting, so he decided to accept battle. He crossed the bridge with his hussars to the other side of the canal and marched to meet the enemy. The two troops met south of Moson, the Austrians leaning against the canal with their left, while the Hungarians with their right wing.

Part of the Austrian cavalry was sent southwards to bypass the Hungarian left flank, while in the center the imperial artillery responded with vigor to the fire of the Hungarian guns advancing from that direction. But when the hussars of the Hungarian left wing started to charge in echelon formation towards the Austrian encircling troops, the enemy lost its courage, and without engaging the Hungarians, abandoned their positions one by one, and before sunset they disappeared in the direction of the village of Levél, retreating so fast that they did not even have time to allow time for all their remaining soldiers to retreat in safety. Some of these were caught and cut down by a hussar patrol.

== Aftermath ==
After the battle, it was noticed by Görgei that despite several hours of cannonading by the superior Austrian artillery, none of their shots hit the target, while the Hungarian cannons caused many casualties among the soldiers and the horses of the enemy.

Several Austrians were left dead and wounded on the battlefield. All were hit by Hungarian cannon fire. The booty, apart from 1 wounded Austrian prisoner, was a lot of horse harnesses and weapons.

The mood in the Hungarian part was much lifted by the victorious outcome of this battle. Görgei begins his report to Kossuth: Today we have won... ("Ma győztünk") This was misunderstood in Pest and reproduced on posters as We have already won... (Már győztünk), although the battle, which was of great importance in raising the morale, was, in fact, a minor rearguard skirmish, and could not stop the Austrian main army's advance.

In the battle distinguished themselves Colonel Zellenhoffer, Lieutenant Colonel Szegedy, Major Kornél Görgei, while Major Lipót Zichy was promoted to lieutenant colonel.

Nevertheless, in view of the general situation, Artúr Görgei decided to retreat, while he burned the large stocks of grain and fodder accumulated along the road, to prevent them from falling into enemy hands. On 19 December, after the Zichy and Karger brigades, which had been thought to have been lost, had joined the rest of the army, the Hungarian Army of the Upper Danube concentrated in the entrenchments of Győr.

Jelačić, after Görgei's retreat, occupied Mosony and Magyaróvár with his troops, and in the meantime received orders from Windisch-Grätz to halt his advance for the time being.

== Sources ==
- Bánlaky, József (2001). A magyar nemzet hadtörténelme (The Military History of the Hungarian Nation) (in Hungarian). Budapest: Arcanum Adatbázis.
- Bóna, Gábor, ed. (1999). The Hungarian Revolution and War of Independence. A Military History. War and Society in East Central Europe. Vol. XXXV. Translated by Arató, Nóra. Atlantic Research and Publications, Inc. ISBN 0-88033-433-9.
- Görgey, Artúr (2004). Életem és működésem Magyarországon 1848-ban és 1849-ben- Görgey István fordítását átdolgozta, a bevezetőt és a jegyzeteket írta Katona Tamás (My Life and Activity in Hungary in 1848 and in 1849). István Görgey's translation was revised by Tamás Katona, and also he wrote the Introduction and the Notes. Neumann Kht.
- Lugosy, István (1931). Győr és vidéke 1848-49-ben (Győr and its Surroundings in 1848 and in 1849). Különnyonat a Győri Szemle II. évfolyamából.
