= Battle of Mór =

1848 battle in Hungary

Coordinates: 47°23′15.5″N 18°11′20.7″E

- Part of the Hungarian Revolution of 1848
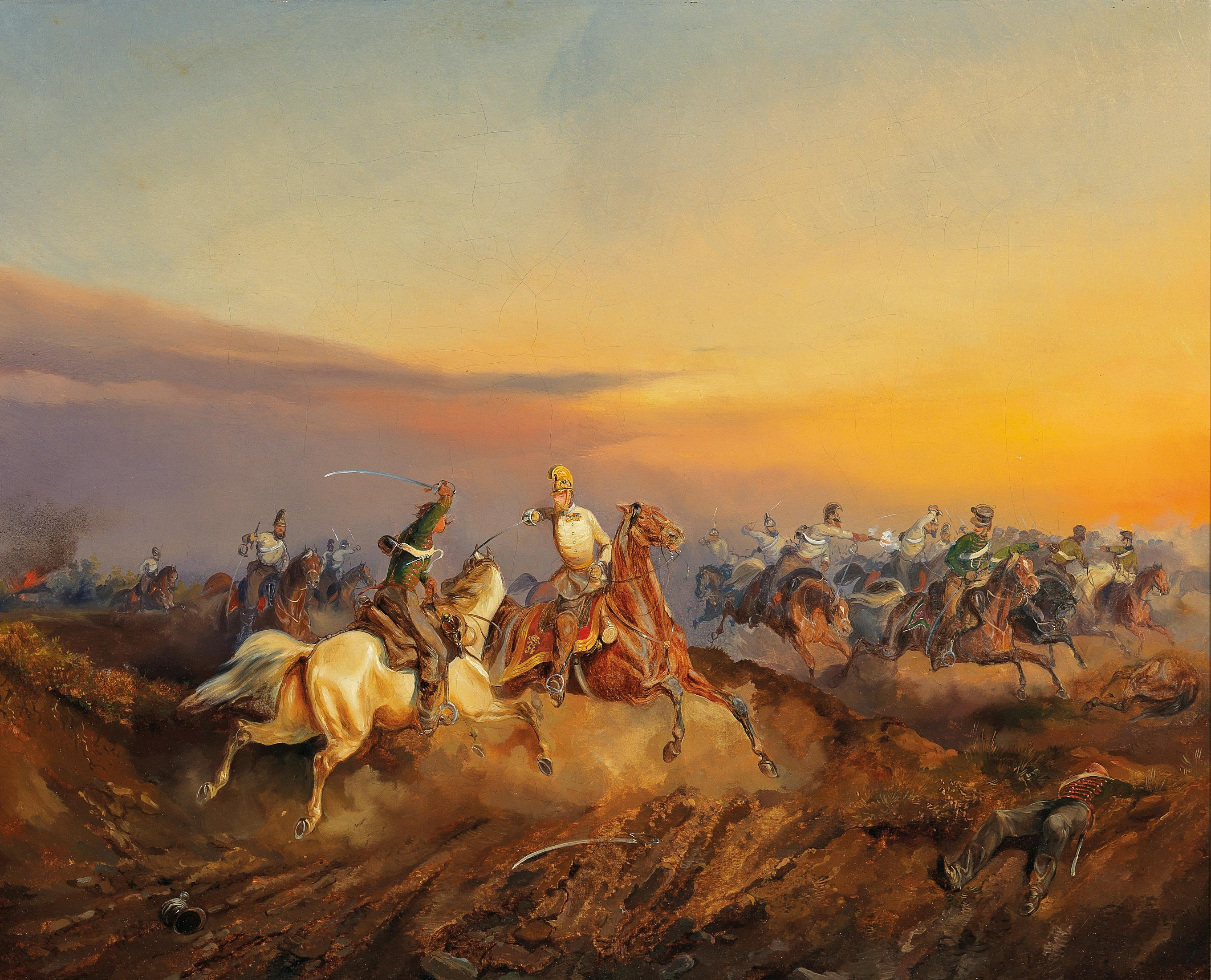
- Alexander Ritter von Bensa: Scene from the Battle of Mór with the fight between Austrian Dragoons and Hungarian Hussars
Date	30 December 1848
Location	Mór, Fejér County, Kingdom of Hungary
Result	Austro-Croatian Victory

Belligerents
Hungarian Revolutionary Army	Austrian Empire: Croatia

Commanders and leaders
Mór Perczel	Josip Jelačić; Ferenc Ottinger

Strength
6,452+? men 880+? horses 26 cannons	5,682+? men 2,757+? horses 18 cannons

Casualties and losses
100–310 dead 107 wounded 2,200–2,510 missing or prisoner 5 (6–7) cannons	Total: 80 men 10–37 horses

The Battle of Mór took place during the Hungarian Revolution of 1848 on 30 December 1848 between Austria and Hungarian Revolutionary Army. The Austrians were led by Croatian Ban Lieutenant General Josip Jelačić, while the Hungarians were led by Major General Mór Perczel. The Austrians were victorious and, subsequently, the Hungarian main army led by Artúr Görgei lost the last chance to stop the Austrian armies which were threatening the Hungarian capitals Pest and Buda. As a result of this, the Austrian army led by Field Marshal Alfred I, Prince of Windisch-Grätz occupied on 5 January 1849 Pest and Buda.

== Background ==
In the autumn of 1848, the defense of Western Hungary was entrusted to two armies quite far from each other. One of them was the Army of Upper Danube of about 28,000, led by Major General Artúr Görgei, deployed from the Nádas Pass in the Little Carpathians to the southern shore of Lake Fertő. Major General Mór Perczel had about 9-10 000 soldiers stationed along the Mura river, keeping an eye on the enemy who was preparing to invade Hungary from Croatia and Styria.

The Hungarian political and military leadership hoped that there would be no enemy attacks in 1848 so that they could use the winter to organize and increase the army. This would have been crucial for the defense of the country, because, for example, nearly a third of Perczel's army was completely unarmed, and more than a third of Görgei's army was made up of fresh recruits who had not yet held a rifle in their hands. The opposing Austrian imperial army was much superior, both in numbers and in training. Görgei faced an army of nearly 55,000 men under the command of Field Marshal Alfred I, Prince of Windisch-Grätz. Perczel was threatened by an attack from the south and west, by two army corps, each of about 6,000 men.

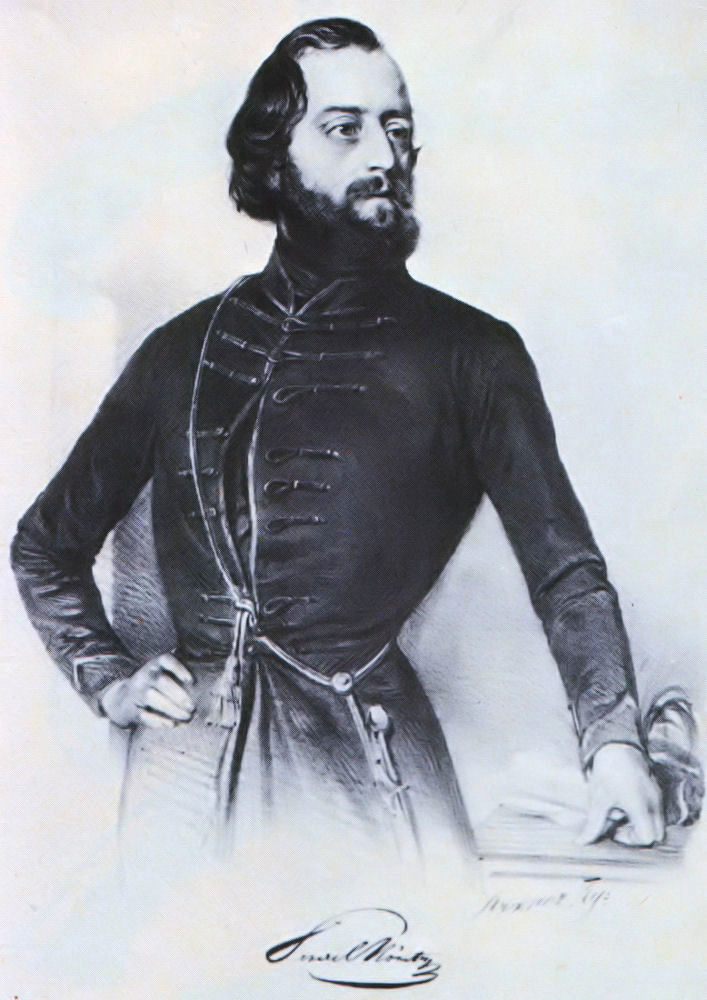
Mór Perczel

The enemy invasion was not long in coming. On 14 December, Lieutenant General Balthasar von Simunich's division launched an attack at the Nádas Pass, the northernmost point of the Hungarian line, and on 16 December the attack of the main imperial forces began on the right bank of the Danube. The much superior enemy broke through at several points the Hungarian brigades deployed in a thin line and advanced unhindered towards the town of Győr. Thanks to the vigilance of individual brigade commanders and the helpfulness of the local Hungarian population, most of the separated troops, with longer or shorter detours, made their way, without being captured or destroyed by the enemy, to the Hungarian camp in the fortified Győr. Görgei's hussars defeated the enemy units advancing with overconfidence in a rearguard action in the Battle of Moson, and therefore Windisch-Grätz decided not to launch a frontal attack against the Hungarian army, but to surround it. But this took time, so between 19 and 26 December Görgei won some time to organize his troops in Győr.

Lajos Kossuth, the Chairman of the National Defence Commission (OHB), the country's true leader, asked Görgei to defend Győr. Kossuth, in successive letters, kept promising reinforcements to Görgei, but they took time to arrive. Most of the reinforcements were to arrive from the Hungarian troops in southern Hungary, which was too far from Győr. However, Kossuth was over-optimistic. Because of the distance, the majority of the troops ordered from Bácska and Bánság could only join Görgei's army, only at the end of December or the beginning of January when he already retreated in Budapest.

Kossuth also intended Perczel's corps as such a reinforcement, on 16 December when the news of Simunich's attack arrived. Both Kossuth and Görgei hoped that the latter's and Perczel's armies, in cooperation with each other, could defend the northern part of Transdanubia from the enemy invasion. The best way to do this seemed to be the plan of Perczel's troops to join Görgei's army in Győr.

However, Perczel did not arrive in Győr. He did not hurry in a straight line to Győr, but when he retreated from Lendva, made a detour to Körmend, and then headed for Devecser instead of Pápa, losing about two days, but even following a straight direction, he would not have reached Győr until the evening of 26 December - provided he had not stumbled upon any of the Imperial columns surrounding the city. The reason for this is explained by the fact that the reports and directions given to him by Kossuth, Görgei, and the Government's Commissar General László Csány, and Perczel's own guide gave him wrong directions, but it cannot be ruled out that he deliberately avoided cooperation with Görgei, because it is well known that they had not liked each other since their clash after the great success at Ozora, when Görgei declared Perczel unfit to lead the army, while the latter wanted to shoot the disobedient Görgei in the head.

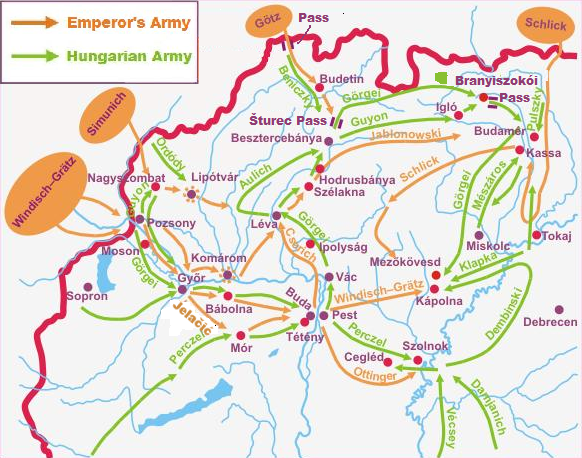
Winter campaign: the attack of the Austrian armies against Hungary

At dawn on 27 December, Görgei evacuated Győr and moved his troops in several columns towards the Vértes Hills. The decision to retreat from the town was taken at the last minute; if Görgei had stayed there for half a day longer, he and his troops would have been caught in a pincer by the Austrians.

After the capture of Győr, Field Marshal Windisch-Grätz's main objective was to prevent Görgei's and Perczel's troops from joining. He entrusted this task to the corps of Lieutenant General Josip Jelačić.

Kossuth was seriously worried by the abandoning of Győr. Thus, in increasingly impatient letters, he demanded Görgei to confront the enemy.

== Prelude ==
In the meantime, Perczel's army reached Kisbér on 28 December, and on 29 December it retreated through the Strait of Sárkány (Dragon) to Mór. On the night of 29 December, Perczel positioned his army on the heights from Mór, on both sides of the road from Sárkány, and set up his outposts on the mounds east of Sárkány. He had about 6,000 soldiers at that time, because the other 4,000 or so, were marching in another direction toward Buda and Pest. According to historian József Bánlaky, Perczel's troops also included a small detachment from Görgei's Army of the Upper Danube. On the 29th, Kossuth ordered Görgei to clash with Windisch-Grätz's main army. He outlined a purely illusory battle plan: he demanded that Görgeit defend a front of some 25-30 kilometers wide so that the troops could resist outnumbering enemy attacks at any point of it. Görgei explained in his reply that the battle was impossible to fight under Kossuth's conditions.

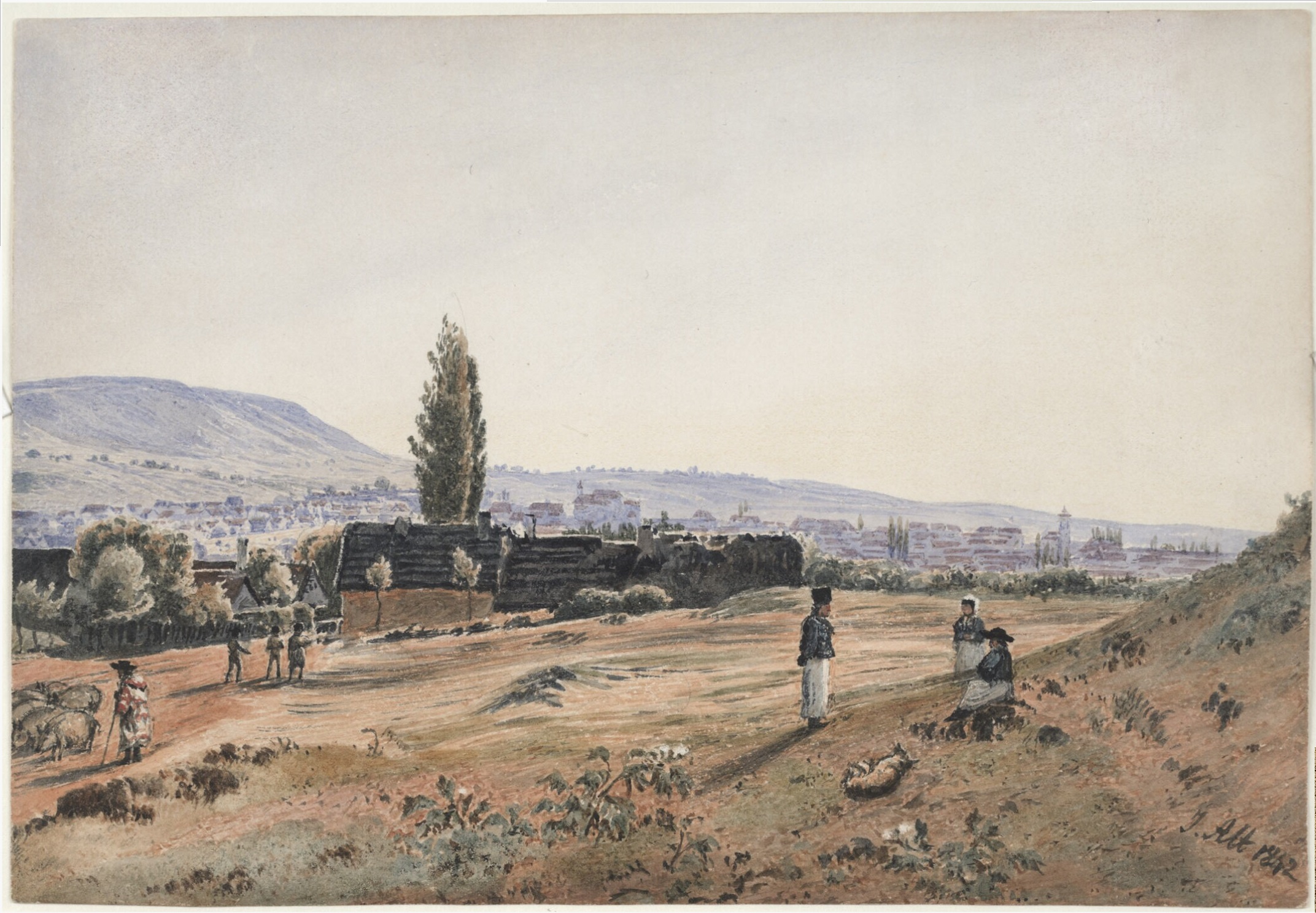
Mór in the Fejér county by Jakob Alt (1842)

Now Kossuth, dissatisfied with Görgei because of his answer and the surrender of Győr, he wrote a letter to his opponent, Perczel, urging him to confront the Austrians. Only unity and unity for God's sake! The homeland is in great danger. [... Please give me] some victory, my sweet Maurice! The continuous retreat has dampened the spirit of the army, - an attack, a victory must necessarily take place before the decisive battle!, – he wrote to the hot-headed general, for whom that was more than enough to take a hasty decision.

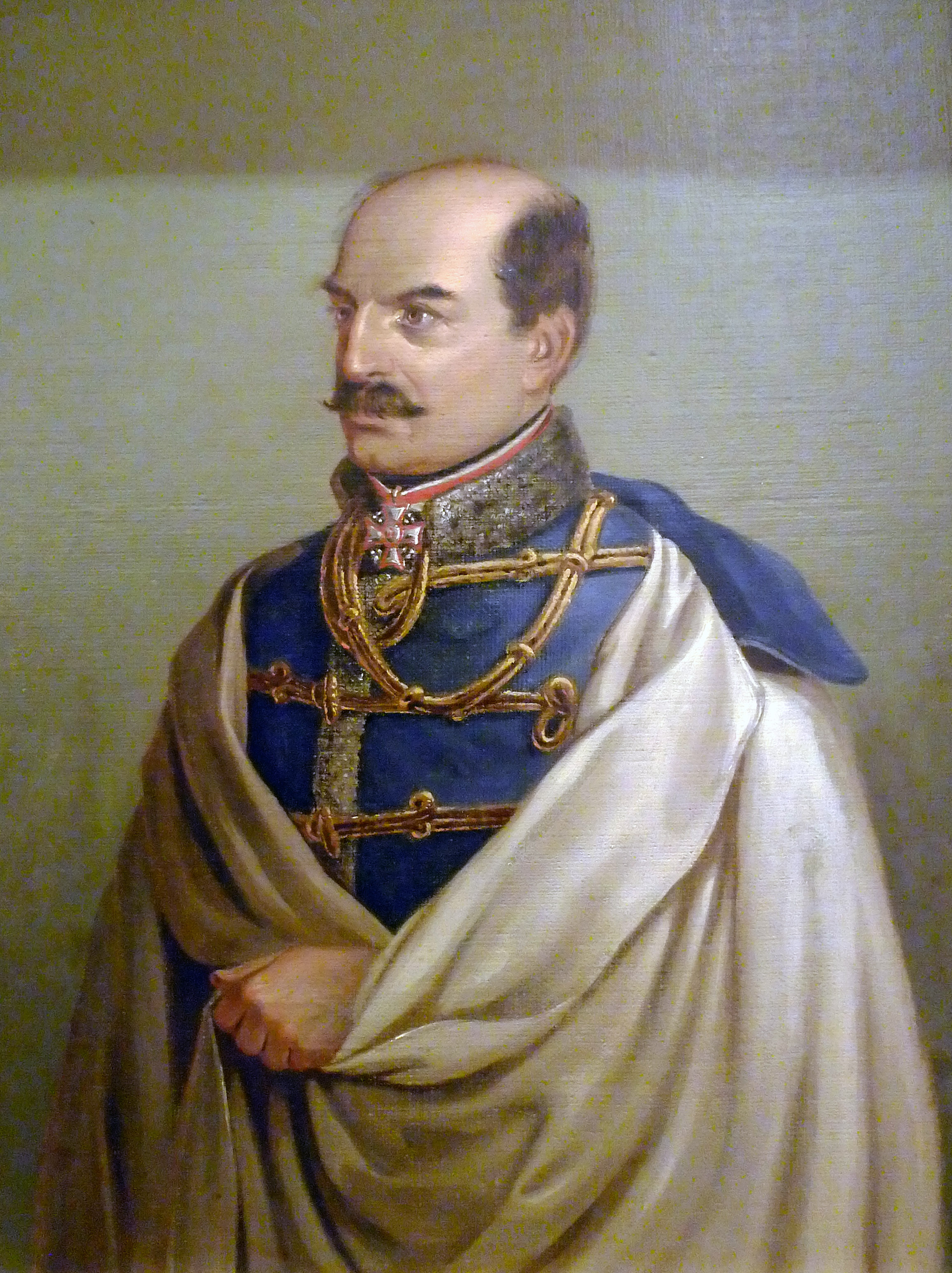
Josip Jelačić painting 1850

Perczel received both Kossuth's and Csány's letters on 30 December. He called a War Council and against the advice of his more learned officers, decided to accept the battle with the enemy. His decision was allegedly influenced also by the fact that he was informed by the commander of one of his divisions, whose soldiers still had no rifles, Lieutenant Colonel István Szekulits, that if the enemy is not held at Mór, he will not be able to take a comfortable distance from the pursuing enemy, thus they will arrive at Székesfehérvár at the same time. Perczel, however, failed to reconnoiter the enemy's forces, and similarly failed to inform Görgei about his plan to fight Jelačić. He did not inform even the brigade commander, Lieutenant Colonel János Horváth, sent by Görgei to maintain contact between their armies, who only learned of the battle from the sound of the cannonade.

According to the memoirs of Major General Ferenc Meszéna, he warned Perczel of the disadvantages of the army's deployment at Mór:The position at Mór is not favorable, it has no advantage for defense, and is [also] dangerous against an enemy who advances out of the forest from the direction of Kisbér, as he can surround the position from all sides. He considered the army's position particularly dangerous because of the forest within a cannon shot distance towards Kisbér, because this forest is so sparse that the troops and guns can move freely in it in all directions.

Meszéna tried to warn Perczel of these dangers, but his commander was undeterred. All that Meszéna succeeded in doing was that Perczel sent the corps' road engineers (sappers) forward on the road to Kisber, and had made a barricade of a couple of cut trees, to prevent the enemy from advancing.

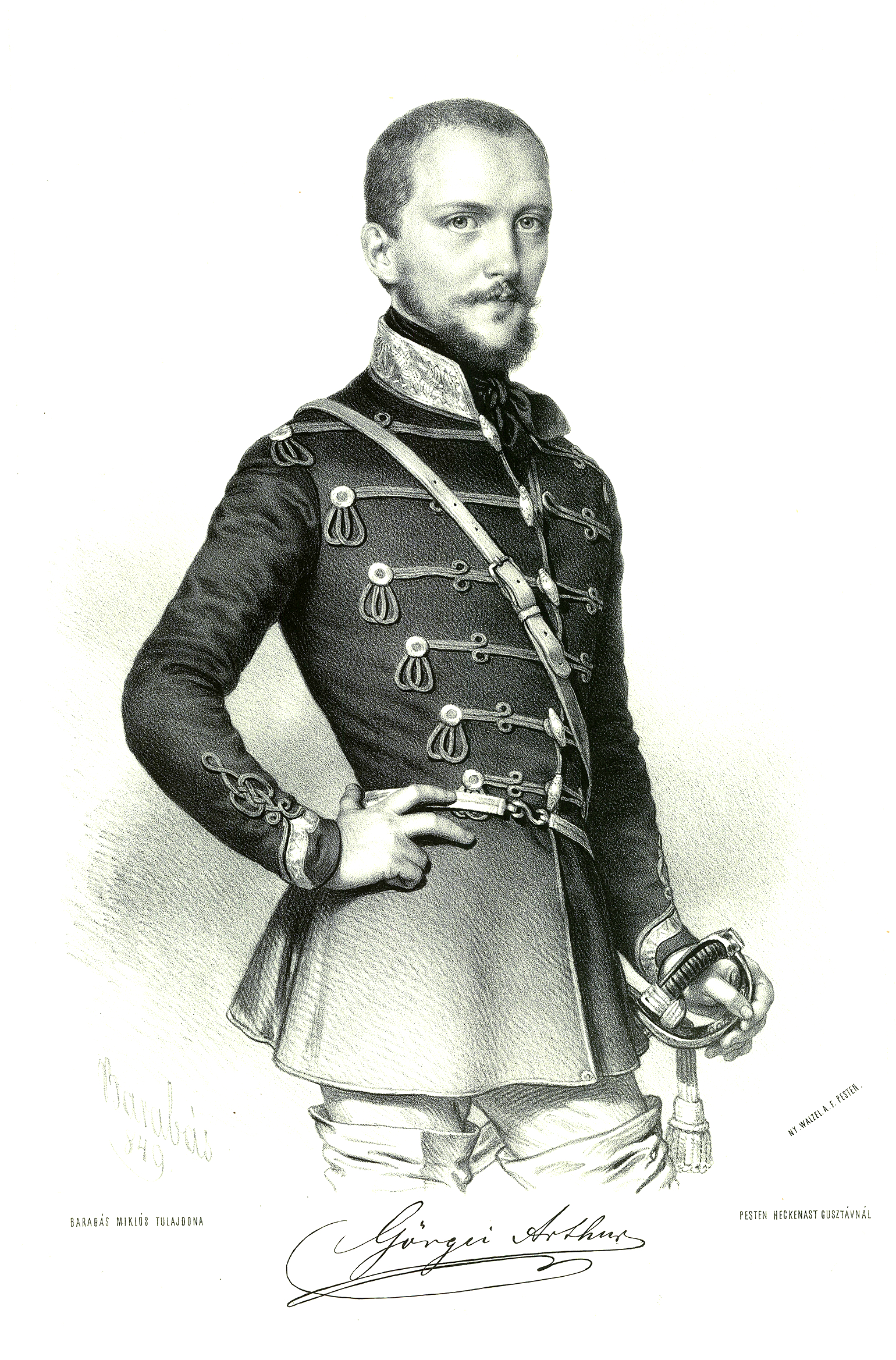
Artúr Görgei by Miklós Barabás

Due to the contiguous forest, the Hungarian corps could be bypassed unseen by the enemy also from the north. According to a post-operation diary written in 1850, Mór lies on the side of Csóka Hill in a narrow valley through which the small Gaja stream flows. The elevated plain on which the country town lies descends on three sides and forms a gentle curve with the opposite slopes of the Sárkány Ridge to the north, which is cut across by the main road. The hills surrounding the valley are covered with forest, from which the highway emerges about a thousand paces away from the village. Only one side of the Csóka hill is planted with vines. The exit from the forested gorge on the side of Sárkány can be therefore hit [with cannons] even more effectively from the Mór hill. The enemy, however, did not tie himself to the road, as the forest to the west of it was very sparse and could be traversed with little effort by artillery, and, moreover, the position from Mór was dominated from the opposite heights. So it wasn't hard to calculate that such a position was almost undefendable... According to an officer, The hills and forests to the west of the city were ceded to the imperialists, [thus] our whole army stretched like an open book [in front of them] along a huge plain. Another participant in the battle wrote that our position was extremely bad; the forest was not far from us, in which the enemy could arrange his army to attack without being harmed or even noticed. Mór Perczel's opinion on the defensibility of the Mór position was supported only by his brother Miklós Perczel: our position was so beautiful and good that if our artillerymen were not scared, we would have beaten [the enemy] brilliantly.

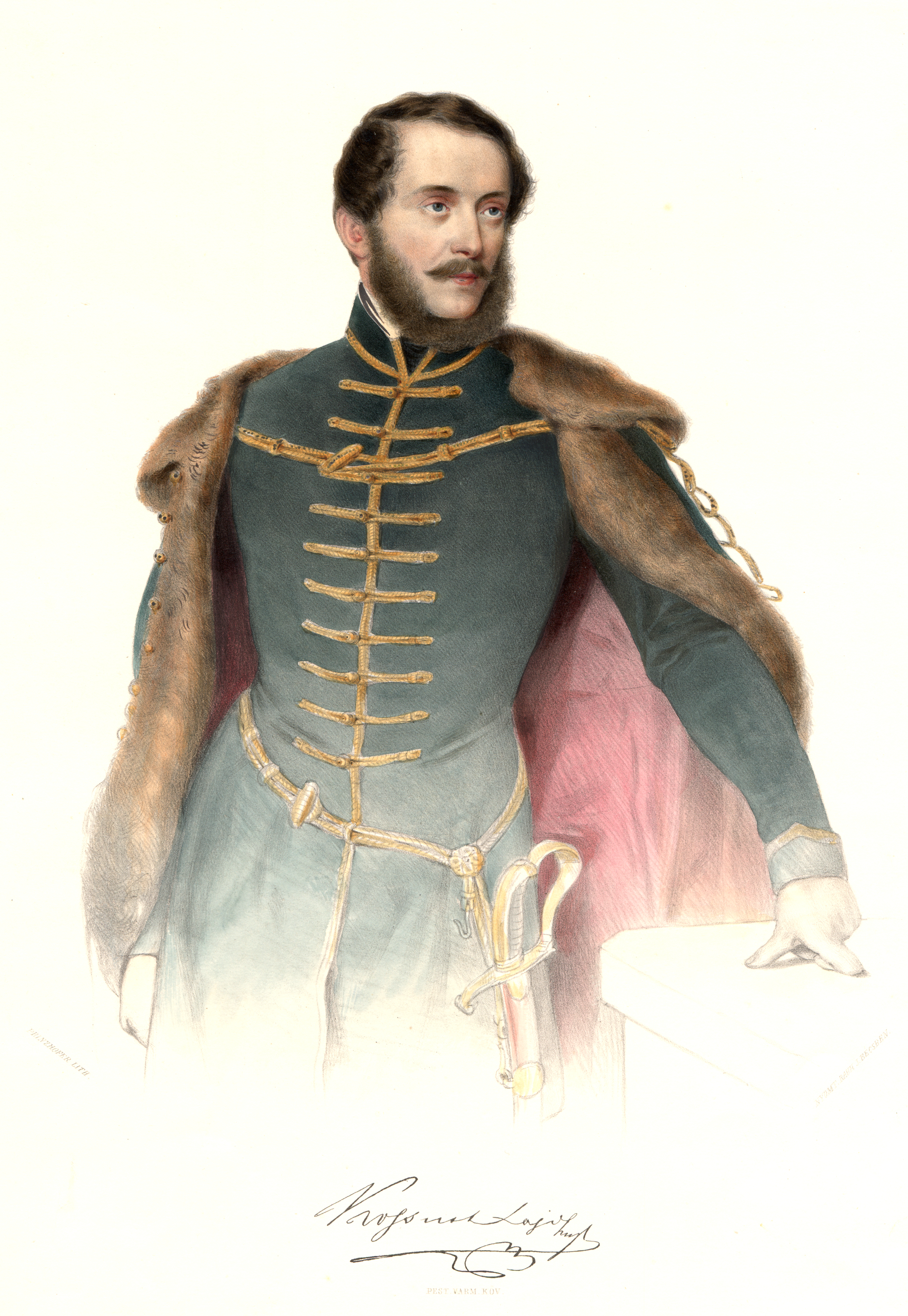
Lajos Kossuth 1848 by Prinzhofer

In his war report written after the battle, Perczel described his position at Mór as on the one hand, I had not to fear of being outflanked, on the other hand, I dominated the whole countryside with my cannons, and finally, the enemy, who had a huge number of cavalry, could not deploy in front of me because of the forest...

The K.u.k. war reports outline that the Hungarian position was very advantageous, but the praise of the enemy's position and strength was a constant topos of the imperial war report writers and served no other purpose than to make the victories won over the "rebels" even more “magnificent”.

Lieutenant General Jelačić's I. Corps, which formed the right wing of Windisch-Grätz's army that attacked Hungary on 16 December, had several parts which before the battle, were stationed in various locations. On 29 December, the Grammont Brigade, the 3rd (Franz Joseph) Dragoon Regiment and the Banderial (the Ban's) Hussar Regiment were stationed in Kisbér, the Hartlieb Division, the batteries and artillery reserve in Mezőőrs, and the Ottinger Brigade in the settlements between Mezőörs and Kisbér. Jelačić had intended to give his troops a rest day on 30 December, but at his headquarters in Kisbér he was informed that Perczel had left the settlement that morning with 8,000-10,000 men (according to other sources, 8,000 infantry, 600-800 cavalry and 24 guns) and marched to Mór. Major General Zeisberg, the Corps Chief of Staff, suggested Jelačić to attack the enemy. Jelačić, who had set up his headquarters in the castle owned by Kázmér Batthyány (one of the most radical Hungarian politicians) in Kisbér, apparently inspired by his earlier success in the Battle of Bábolna, was so delighted by the idea that he wanted to move with his troops out that night for attack, but his officers dissuaded him, pointing the tiredness of the troops. It was also mentioned, according to the diary of Hermann Dahlen, the Ban's aide-de-camp, that Mór lies in the middle of the vast Bakony forest, from which the enemy can easily slip away under cover of darkness through an area unknown to us. After the officers expressed their fear that Windisch-Grätz would prevent them from attacking with some counter-order, Jelačić vowed to lead them against the enemy, to reach Perczel, he added with a laugh, even if I have to chase him to Asia. Then he raised his glass: To our victory! To those who will stand out in battle tomorrow.

=== Preparations ===
Jelačić, therefore, gave his officers the next day's marching orders. Colonel Ullrich with the 3. Dragoon and the Banderaial Hussar Regiments, which formed the vanguard of the Grammont Brigade, had to depart toward Mór at 4,45 o'clock on the next morning. Ferenc Ottinger's cavalry brigade was ordered to leave for Seréd via Mór at 5 o'clock in the morning. One of the brigades of Hartlieb's division and the artillery reserve was also ordered to march to Mór, while its other brigade to Seréd. The march finally started at 5 a.m.

Ottinger's brigade followed the march of the bulk of the Ban's army from a mile distance, closed by Hartlieb's division and the artillery reserve, also at a distance of a mile, an hour and a half of walking. Jelačić had also ordered the 3rd Dragoon Regiment to the vanguard, but they received the order late due to a mistake and did not appear on the battlefield until after the Ottinger Brigade had arrived.

The Hungarian troops were assembled at 6 a.m. in the market square of Mór, where they "were shivering from the cold" until 7 a.m. The cold is emphasized by all those former soldiers who wrote recollections about the battle, and there is no doubt that the hour of unnecessary waiting did not help the morale of the soldiers. At 7 o'clock the order came for everyone to return to their quarters, which caused discontent. At half past eight, György Halászi, the assistant priest-mediator of the 35th Honvéd Battalion, asked the Calvinist pastor to chime the bell for the service, and some of the Honvéds prayed in the church, asking for help from "the God of the Hungarians". Then the Austrian cannons started to roar, signaling that the enemy started its attack. Because of the unexpected attack, the soldiers, in their haste, could not all find their own units, so they mixed up in improvised units, and so they ran out in front of Mór. In front of the town, the troops were put in order.

=== Opposing forces ===
Hungarian army:

Army section	Unit	Leader	Infantry company	Cavalry company	Horse	Cannon	Number
Right wing	47. Honvéd battalion	Major Gyika	6	-	-	-	1200
Right wing	six-pounder ½ infantry battery	Lieutenant Mike	-	-	-	3	-
Center	48. Honvéd battalion & Bereg company	Major Miklós Perczel	6	-	-	-	1200
Center	2. company of the 9. (Nicholas) Hussar Regiment's Major squadrons	Captain Szibenliszt	-	1	110	-	110
Center	one six-pounder battery	First Lieutenant Turcsányi	-	-	?	6	?
Commander's guards	Reserve squadron of the 5. (Radetzky) Hussar Regiment	Captain Beznák	-	½	34	-	34
Left wing	35. Honvéd battalion	Major Bangya	6	-	-	-	1100
Left wing	50. Honvéd battalion	Major Trangoss	6	-	-	-	1300
Left wing	60. (1. Pest) Honvéd Battalion	Captain Gózon	6	-	-	-	750
Left wing	Lieutenant colonel squadron of the 1. (Imperial) Hussar Regiment	Captain Wepler	-	2	190	-	190
Left wing	1. company of the Colonel squadron of the 1. (Imperial) Hussar Regiment	First Lieutenant Scheiter	-	1	120	-	120
Left wing	1. Major squadron of the 9. (Nicholas) Hussar Regiment	First Lieutenant Horváth	-	2	220	-	220
Left wing	one six-pounder infantry battery	First Lieutenant Schill	-	-	?	7	?
Left wing	6. six-pounder cavalry battery	Captain Fischer	-	-	112	8	134
Reserve	2. company of the Colonel squadron of the 4. (Alexander) Hussar Regiment	?	-	1	94	-	94
Reserve	Sappers	Lieutenant Hermann Schwarz	-	-	-	-	?
Reserve	two one-pounder cannons	-	-	-	?	2	?
Total			30	7 ½	880+?	26	6452+?

Austrian army:

Army section	Combat arms	Unit	Leader	Infantry company	Cavalry company	Horse	Cannon	Number
Grammont brigade
Grammont brigade	Infantry	3. battalion of the 1. (Lika) border guard regiment	Lieutenant colonel Budisavliević	6	-	-	-	2936
Grammont brigade	Infantry	2. battalion of the 8. (Stara Gradiška) border guard regiment	Major Urm	6	-	-	-	2936
Grammont brigade	Infantry	5. Jäger battalion	Lieutenant colonel Liubimirecko	6	-	-	-	2936
Grammont brigade	Cavalry	Banderial (Ban's) Hussar regiment	-	-	4	465	-	458
Grammont brigade	Cavalry	3. (Franz Joseph) Dragoon Regiment	Lieutenant Colonel Rudolf Ullrich von Helmschild	-	6	646	-	642
Grammont brigade	Artillery	2. six-pounder infantry battery	Lieutenant Jurosch	-	-	?	6	?
Grammont brigade	Brigade total			18	10	1111+?	6	4036+?
Ottinger brigade
Ottinger brigade	Cavalry	6. (Wallmoden) Cuirassier regiment	Colonel Fejérváry	-	6	720	-	720
Ottinger brigade	Cavalry	7. (Heinrich Hardegg) Cuirassier Regiment	Colonel Sedelmayer	-	6	720	-	720
Ottinger brigade	Artillery	1. six-pounder cavalry battery	Lieutenant Bylandt	-	-	?	6	?
Ottinger brigade	Artillery	5. six-pounder cavalry battery	Lieutenant Loschan	-	-	?	6	?
Ottinger brigade	Brigade total			-	12	1440+?	12	1440+?
		Colonel squadron of the 3. (King of Saxony) Cuirassier Regiment	Colonel Baltheser	-	2	206	-	206
Total				18	24	2757+?	18	5682+?

=== Battle formation ===
The Hungarian troops were deployed north of Mór along the road to Kisbér, in two lines: a mixture of hussars, infantry and cannons. On the right flank, the 47th Home Army Battalion took up position, which was led by Major Ferenc Meszéna, the Chief of the General Staff. On the north side of the vineyard north of Mór, two seven-pounder howitzers and a six-pounder gun were deployed under the command of Lieutenant Mike. Behind them were 4 companies of the 47th Battalion; the other two companies took a position in the stone-fenced tavern from Átk, which was on the right side of the road to Vértesnána. A hussar platoon was detached to secure the right flank.

On the right edge of the center, personally commanded by Perczel, was deployed the 48th Honvéd Battalion, and to the left of it the detached Bereg company. The position of the 48th (Szabolcs) Battalion was so concealed from the left flank that the memoirs of one of the soldiers recalled that "we could neither see nor hear anything of what was happening down there on the battlefield.". On the mound near the road to Kisbér, were placed 6 guns of the six-pounder infantry battery, behind them a detachment of 34 of the 5th (Radetzky) Hussars, and a company of the 9th (Miklós) Hussars. The position of the battery was not particularly advantageous either: according to one soldier, the enemy cavalry coming from the left flank could only be spotted when it was 10-20 paces from them.

The left wing was positioned in front of a hill pass at Timár, opposite the portion of the forest from where Perczel expected the Austrians to attack. On the left flank, led by Colonel András Gáspár, in the first line, in front of the infantry, the 7 guns of the infantry battery, divided into two half-batteries; behind them, next to the town, in line with the city center, on the right, the 50th and on the left the 35th Honvéd battalions were positioned. In the second line took place the 66th Honvéd Battalion, 3 companies of the I. (Imperial) Hussars, 2 companies of the 9. (Nicholas) Hussars, and 8 guns of the 6th Cavalry Battery. This is probably also the place where the sappers retreated. Perczel had also two one-pounder guns, which were supposedly in reserve. A company of the 4. (Alexander) Hussars was probably also in reserve. Meszéna is said to have tried to persuade Perczel to create a larger reserve or to take a more favorable position, but he refused, stubbornly clinging to his own ideas, and even threatening Baron Meszéna [who tried to argue with him] with execution.

Jelačić reported that the Hungarian position was protected by a steep and deep ditch running parallel to the edge of the forest.

== Battle ==
The vanguard of the Grammont Brigade which marched ahead on the morning of 30 December, and the Lieutenant-Colonel squadron of the Banderial (the Ban's) Hussars Regiment led by Colonel Sermage, struck Perczel's outposts beyond Sárkány at about 8 o'clock, and then, emerging from the woods north of Mór, drove back Perczel's advance guard. The Hungarian sappers retreated to the main force, some 3,000 paces opposite the forest. Jelačić saw the Hungarians' position as very advantageous. Therefore, he decided that since he only had three infantry battalions at his disposal, to halt the troops of Grammont in the forest outside the Hungarian firing line, and sent orders to Ottinger to hurry with his cavalry as fast as possible, and to Hartlieb to hurry up as well. Jelačić's plan was to break through the Hungarian right flank with his infantry, cut off the Hungarian retreat, and attack the Hungarian left flank with his cavalry. Meanwhile, Major General Zeisberg, the Ban's Chief of Staff, observed the enemy positions.

Jelačić slowly pushed his infantry forward in the forest, and on the road to Kisbér he tried to advance his artillery and the banderial hussars, but the six-pounder gun on the Hungarian right flank stopped the attempt of encirclement by the advancing Lika border guard battalion. At the same time on the right side of the road to Kisbér, the Ban pushed forward through the forest the 5th Jäger Battalion and the Gradiska Border Guard Battalion. The cavalry and artillery advancing on the road to Kisbér also received such artillery fire from one of the batteries of the Hungarian left wing that it saw better to retreat into the woods until the Ottinger Brigade arrived. In addition to this, the bridge at the edge of the forest was held under crossfire by the Hungarian artillery, but only here could the K.u.K. artillery break out of the forest. About the actions of the Grammont Brigade's infantry battery, both the Austrian and the Hungarian sources are silent, probably because they could not give a successful answer to the Hungarian artillery.

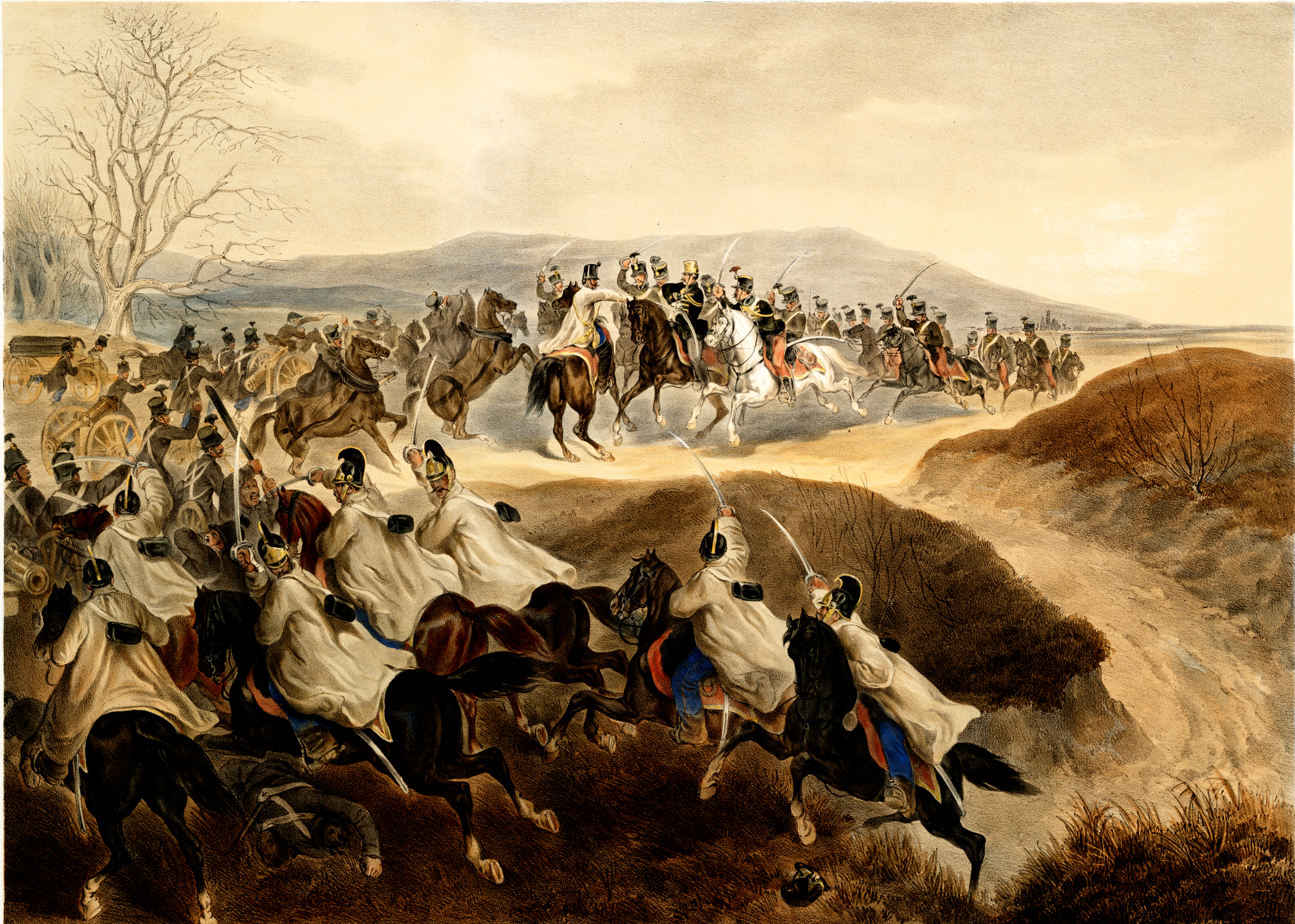
Battle of Mór 1848

Perczel, after his artillery repulsed Jelačić's infantry's attack in the forest, believed that the Austrian main force was there and therefore he has no need to fear an attack from other sides, thus he concentrated all his efforts on the forest. Major Horváth asked Perczel to send the 50. battalion to clear the forest. Perczel decided to send the 4. and 5. companies of the 50th Battalion, and the 7. and 8. companies of the 35th Battalion, ordered in a skirmish chain, against the forest. According to some accounts, the two guns of the six-pounder infantry battery from the left flank and the cavalry battery also entered the forest, but Perczel's war report seems to indicate that he only deployed half a cavalry battery here. The decision turned out to be very unfortunate. As the four companies advanced, they came within range of the Hungarian artillery, and the gunners, unwilling to fire on their own infantry, ceased fire. Jelačić used this opportunity to push forward a battery on the road to Kisbér. The Hungarian infantry companies advanced in the woods, but there, being caught in the crossfire of the superior enemy infantry and the aforementioned battery, and as a result of the renewed assaults of the enemy infantry, they were forced to retreat from the forest. In repulsing the Hungarian attack, the 5th Jäger Battalion particularly distinguished itself. The two companies of the 35th Battalion retreated in relative order, while the two companies of the 50th Battalion were partly broken up and partly captured during the retreat. The latter two companies, which retreated (or rather ran) in small groups, could only be partially reorganized; their soldiers made their way toward Mór.

For now, the Hungarian troops on the right wing and in the center were not involved in the battle.

Ottinger received orders to hurry his march to the battlefield at about 10 a.m., and after half an hour of trotting, the brigade of two regiments of cuirassiers finally arrived. When this happened, Jelačić sent again, under the protection of the forest, the Lika border guard battalion against the Hungarian right flank, and the Gradiska border guard battalion, together with the 5th Jäger battalion against the Hungarian left flank, while the Hungarians tried to stop them with fierce cannon fire. Then Ottinger sent his one-and-a-half cavalry battery forward on the road to Kisbér. Half of the 1st Cavalry Battery took up position to the left of the road and drew on itself the fire of the Hungarian artillery; while the 5th Cavalry Battery, positioned to the right of the road, at the edge of the Imperial troops, and began to fire on the Hungarian troops. The other half of the 1st Cavalry Battery of the Imperial Army stayed with the 7th (Hardegg) Regiment of Cuirassiers. Then the Austrian infantry halted near the batteries to cover them: the 1st Cavalry Battery was covered by the 3rd Lika Battalion, while the 5th Cavalry Battery was covered by the 5th Jäger Battalion and the 2nd Gradiska Battalion. Covered by the fire of these 1½ batteries, Ottinger sent the Wallmoden regiment on the right and the Hardegg regiment on the left to prepare to attack. Caught by Ottinger's cavalry batteries fire, the 66th Battalion was heavily hit and began to flee.

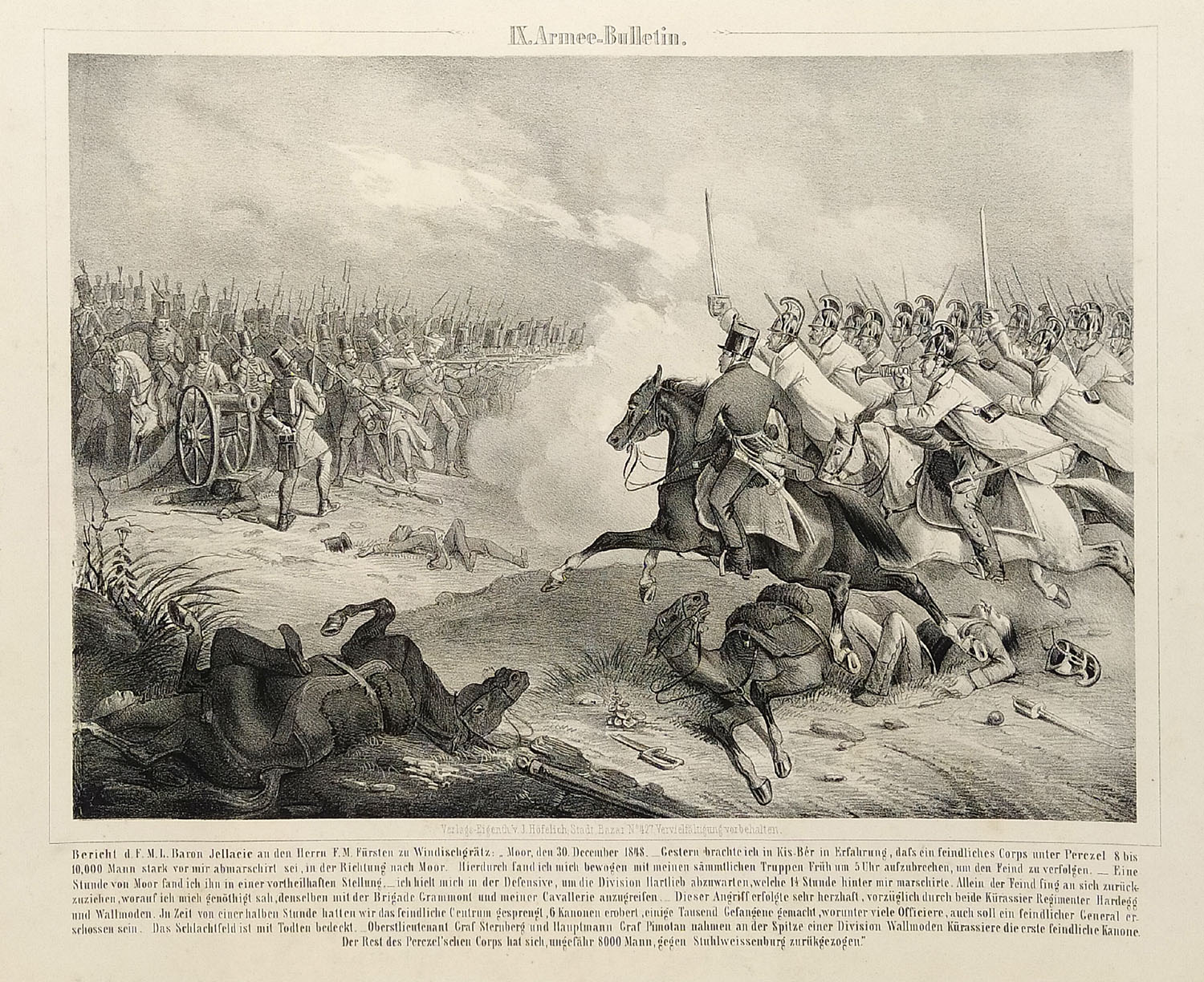
Battle of Mór. 30.12.1849 Austrian cavalry attacking a Hungarian battery

Ottinger then saw that the time had come to attack, and despite Jelačić's refusal twice, he launched an attack, fearing that the Hungarians would retreat. According to Ottinger's orders, the Lieutenant Colonel squadron of the Wallmoden Cuirassiers, led by Lieutenant Colonel Sternberg, was to attack the Hungarian battery in the center in cordon line formation, while the Regiment's Colonel and Major squadrons, led by Colonel Fejérváry, were to attack the hussars on the Hungarian left flank on the right side of the road. The colonel and major squadrons of the Wallmoden cuirassiers, led by Colonel Fejérváry, advanced in columns of four. Seeing this, the 6th Cavalry half battery on the Hungarian left flank limbered up, leaving one gun behind in the haste, and made their way towards Mór, by cutting through the 35th Battalion and the remnants of the 50th Battalion, which, as a result of their retreat from the forest at the start of the battle, haven't yet fully regained their order. Perczel saw that there was a big danger, and under the leadership of Colonel András Gáspár, he sent against them the Imperial hussars from the left wing against the cuirassiers. Some sources say that the hussars were two platoons (i.e. 4 companies), while others say that they were three platoons (i.e. 6 companies). However, the hussar units were frightened by the large mass of the enemy cavalry and rode back without a fight. Perczel then sent all the left wing's cavalry, and they attacked the cuirassiers from the flank just when the 1. platoon riding ahead of the 1. company of the cuirassier's colonel squadron, was lining up to charge. The platoon was led by Count Rudolf Schaffgotsch, and he was confronted by Béla Kun, the lieutenant of the Imperial Hussars, with whom he fought a duel, and the Hungarian, despite being wounded, killed him, inflicting several fatal wounds on the Austrian count. Eventually, Kun was captured by the Austrians, as was Lieutenant Károly Frank, who killed two Austrian cuirassiers. The attack of the Hussars killed and wounded many of the Cuirassiers, including Captain Baron Lafferte and Captain August Wepler, the commander of the lieutenant-colonel squadron of the cuirassiers. These Austrian platoons were crushed by the hussars, and routed, suffering heavy losses. But more and more platoons of the Cuirassiers (the entire lieutenant-colonel squadron and one platoon of the major squadron) supported also by some infantry squads, entered the battle, to which the Hussars could no longer resist and then started to flee.

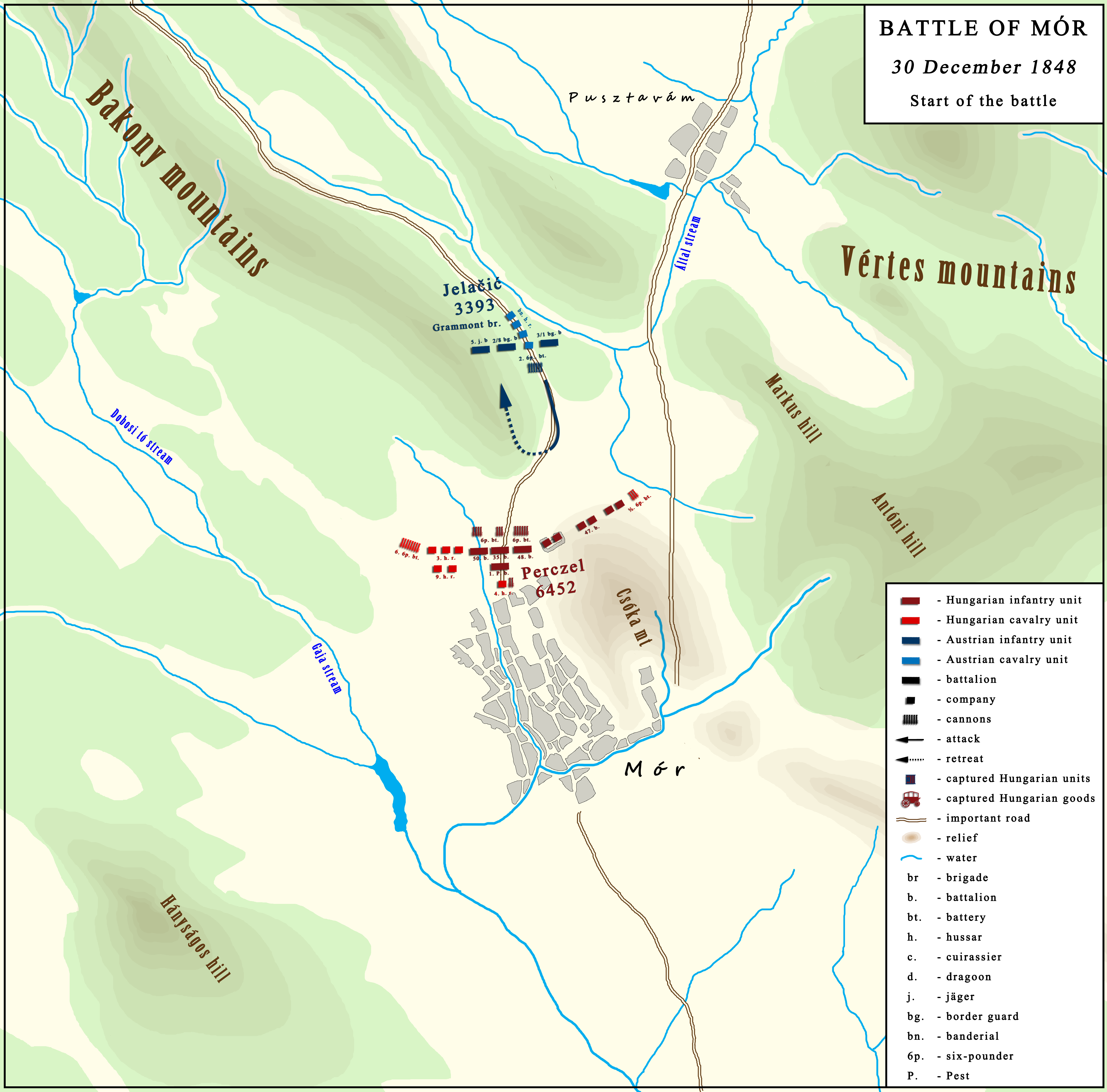
Battle of Mór 30 December 1848. Start of the battle

After this the other half of the 6th Cavalry Battery and the six-pound infantry battery led by Lieutenant Schill tried to resist. But the Imperial Hussars ordered to cover the batteries ran away, thus the other half of the cavalry battery also retreated towards Mór. Seeing this, the six-pound infantry battery also limbered and retreated towards Mór. In the meantime, the 35th and 50th Battalions also began to retreat, but two companies of the 35th Battalion, led by Lieutenant Schwarz, were captured by the pursuing enemy cavalry. A fragment of the battalion, led by Captain Károly Andorffy, tried to resist on the other edge of the town but after a while, it was forced to flee.

Meanwhile, the lieutenant colonel squadron of the Wallmoden Cuirassiers threw themselves on the center led by Perczel. Ottinger had ordered Sternberg to lead the attack in swarm formation, i.e. to move his cuirassiers forward in a broken-up rather than a close formation. The Hungarian infantry battalion stationing there retreated to the right and engaged the attackers in grapeshot fire, but it reportedly flew over the heads of the cuirassiers. The Nicholas Hussar company, which was there to defend the cannons, attacked the Cuirassiers from the flank, so they were forced to halt. A bitter struggle began, during which the cuirassiers came within 20 paces of Perczel himself. Lieutenant-General Zastavniković and Captain Count Pimodan distinguished themselves in the assault. The 14 cuirassiers, led by Sternberg in person, came within range of the battery; the first cannon was captured by Sternberg himself, the other three by the cuirassiers who were rapidly following him, among them Captain Georges Pimodan. Pimodan cut off a wagoner of his horse, at which moment, according to his memoirs, half a company of hussars surrounded him. Pimodan stabbed the officer leading the hussars, but he had not even pulled the sword out of the wound when the hussars surrounded him, grabbing him by the arm and neck. Pimodan slashed one of his attackers in the face as their sword hits rained down on him. Desperately, he sat spurs to his horse, which finally freed him from the hussars. Pimodan received a cut to the head, another to the forehead, and one to his shoulder, and managed to escape only by great luck. Thanks to the hussars' intervention the remaining two guns of the Hungarian battery escaped. The 48th Battalion and the Bereg Company, which were on their left, repulsed the attack of the cuirassiers with volley fire after they formed a mass, and even temporarily recaptured the three guns from the enemy, but they could not tow them away, because they had no horses. The fourth cannon was sent by Major Miklós Perczel toward Mór. Two cuirassiers tried to take the flag of the unit, but one of them was shot, to which the other fled.

However, they could not resist another attack. All the more so, because Ottinger, seeing the recapture of the battery, ordered the Hardegg cuirassier regiment to advance, and the Wallmoden cuirassiers, who earlier crushed the left flank, were already approaching from the direction of Mór, so Miklós Perczel could not do anything else, than ordering a retreat in a close formation. In the lead was the best equipped Bereg company. The officer leading the approaching Cuirassiers from the direction of Mór called on the battalion to surrender with an excellent Hungarian accent, but the first two companies fired a volley on them, and the Cuirassiers retreated. The battalion led by Miklós Perczel did not march into the town, but made its way through the hedgerows up to the "vineyard".

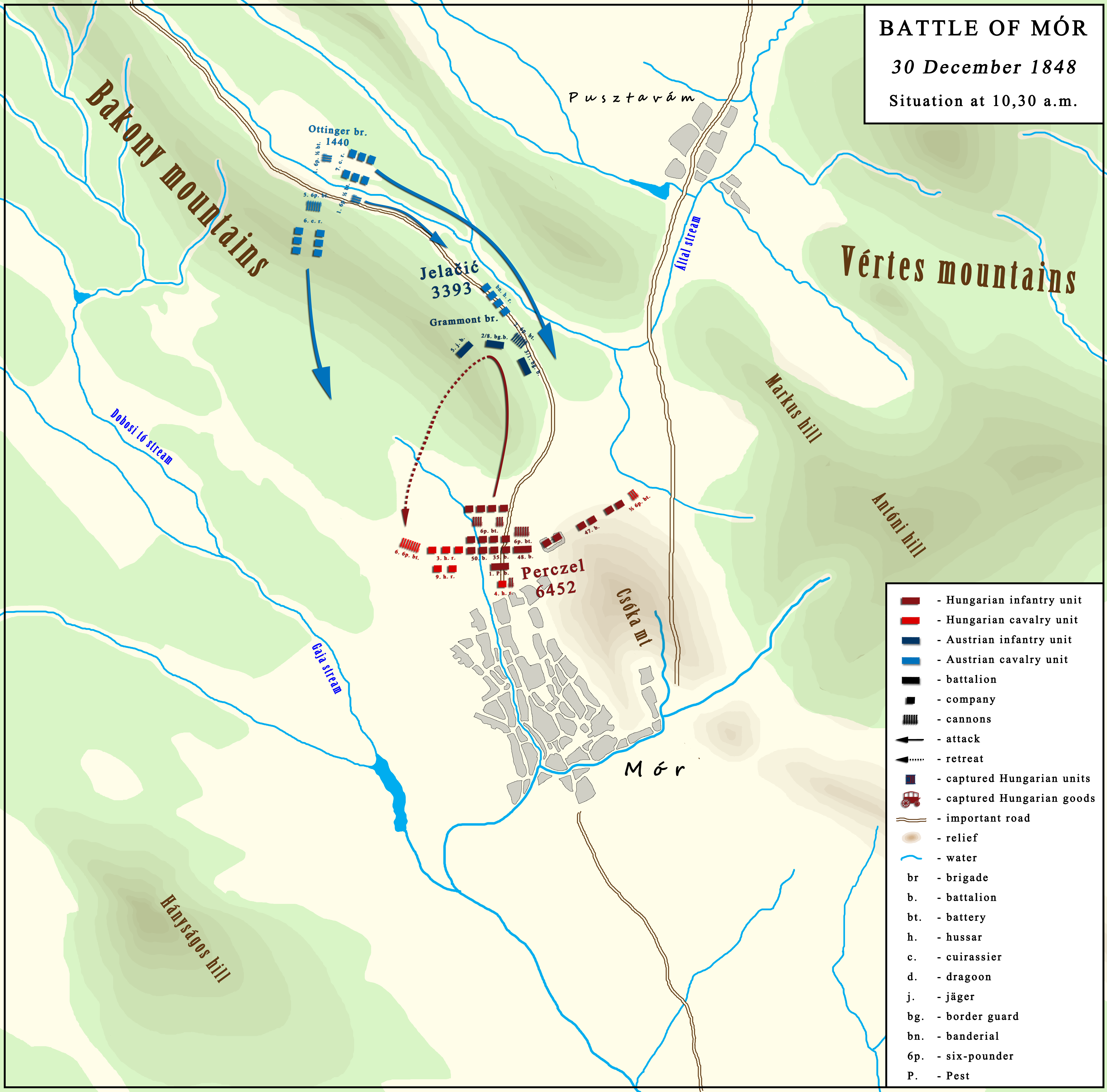
Battle of Mór 30 December 1848. Situation at 10.30

The attack of the cuirassiers tore apart the 6th Company of the 48th Battalion, which broke up and fled through the town towards Csákvár, and when they were attacked by the cuirassiers at the chapel on the outskirts of the town they fired a volley on them, then made their way towards the vineyards. The 48. battalion was in the vanguard, and one of its 32-man strong platoons was also pressed into the town, and after the enemy infantry had begun to push in the town from all sides, they attacked, on one of the streets, the cuirassiers which appeared in front of them, broke through them, and fled down the side streets.

The Bereg company (part of the 48. battalion) also retreated separately towards Csákvár, breaking through the cuirassiers. The other five companies of the 48th Battalion, led by Major Miklós Perczel, retreated in order to Csákvár, where they joined Lieutenant Colonel Ferdinand Karger's brigade with around 500 other fleeing soldiers from other units.

An infantry battery retreating from the left flank was caught up by the Wallmoden cuirassiers at the entrance to Mór. At that very moment, two companies of the Nicholas Hussars led by lieutenant colonel János Horváth, got in front of the battery, cutting their retreat path. This threatened the artillerymen and hussars, piled one upon another, to be cut down by the cuirassiers, and to loose the guns. With a quick decision, the Alexander and Nicholas hussars turned back and charged the pursuing cuirassiers. The company commander Captain József Mjk, especially distinguished himself in the fight. In the meantime, the Wallmoden and the Hardegg cuirassiers, who had arrived there, had captured or slaughtered all but twenty of the crew at the entrance of Mór in the terrible tumult and confusion. An attempt was made to turn back a gun, on which two gunners were still sitting, but the road was so narrow that it was impossible to turn back with the four horses which were pulling it. Then the cuirassiers cut their way, but right then three Nicholas Hussars appeared, and cut down four cuirassiers chasing away the others, thus saving the cannon. In the fight, from the Wallmoden cuirassiers Lieutenant Count Berchtold was seriously wounded, Colonel Fejérváry was shot by a pistol, and Lieutenant Cahusak was lightly wounded. The flag-bearing corporal of the major squadron of the Wallmoden Cuirassiers was cut down by the Hungarian Hussars, and only Deputy Flag-bearer Josef Krpon, and Corporals Franz Nikel and Hrabal were able to recover the flag. Of the Hungarian Hussars, first lieutenant László Tisza from the Nicholas Hussars, the aide-de-camp of Colonel Gáspár, was killed on the battlefield suffering 34 wounds from 17 cuts in the duel with First Lieutenant Friedrich (Frederic) Yates. None of the seven remaining guns of the 6th Cavalry Battery, and only one of the seven guns of Schill's infantry battery fell into enemy hands. The escape of the Hungarian batteries which were leaving the town is also said to have been helped by the fact that they retreated towards Bodajk, and the Imperial Cavalry lost their trail.

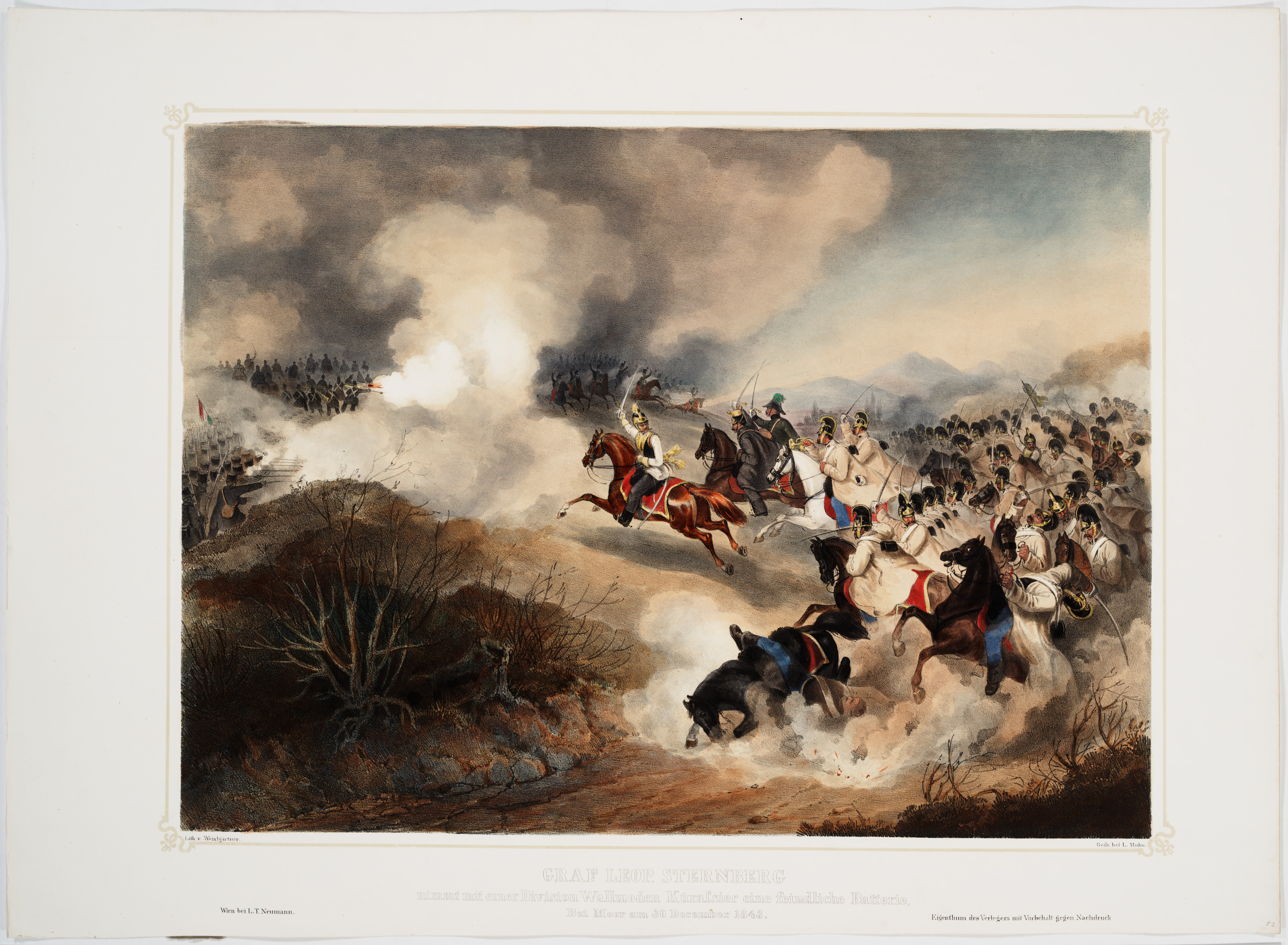
Battle of Mór. Leopold Sternberg attacking with the Wallmoden Cuirassiers a Hungarian battery

In the meantime, the running soldiers of the 35th and 50th Battalions also arrived in the town. A 30-man platoon of the 50th (formed from the Hunyadi militia) Battalion took up a makeshift firing position in a trench on the outskirts of the town, firing at the pursuing, probably Hardegg cuirassiers, and then ran into the town. Here they were confronted by another enemy cavalry troop, on which they again fired a volley. The horsemen turned, and the honvéds ran after them so fast that they were able to squeeze through the horses into the open courtyards. Perczel later wrote - apparently based on reports from other refugees - that the soldiers of the 35th and 50th Honvéd Battalions were still fighting hard in the town and shot down many of the enemy.

A small group of the 50th Battalion tried to defend themselves at the church, but most of them were cut down or captured. As an indication of the fierce fighting in the town, the Hardegg cuirassiers dismounted and cleared the houses of the honvéds who were firing at them, by killing them one by one, without mercy, in a terrible massacre. In the process, Lieutenant-Colonel Staufer had his horse shot from under him, as happened also to First Lieutenant Baron Boxberg. Lieutenant Doser's armour was pierced by a bullet. According to the regimental history of the Hardegg cuirassiers, they were fired at from every corner and window, and from every loft. The Hardegg cuirassiers took a total of 300 prisoners during the battle, while the Banderial Hussars, who also took part in the fights inside Mór, took 248 prisoners in the town alone.

However, according to Jelačić's battle report, the Lika battalion completed the clearing of the city of Hungarian soldiers. The Gradiska border guard battalion also took part in this operation, and a corporal named Thanasia Jovanović single-handedly took 14 prisoners in one of the houses. The 2nd Company of the 5th Jäger Battalion also took a large number of prisoners, "partly after fierce resistance, partly more easily". However, Jelačić writes elsewhere that he did not dare to enter the town with his three battalions because of the strong resistance of the Hungarians who were trapped there. It is therefore more plausible that the infantry battalions only entered the settlement to collect the prisoners who surrendered after the arrival of Hartlieb's division. However, even after the Austrians withdrew, there were still some Hungarian soldiers hiding in the town, who then left the town freely.

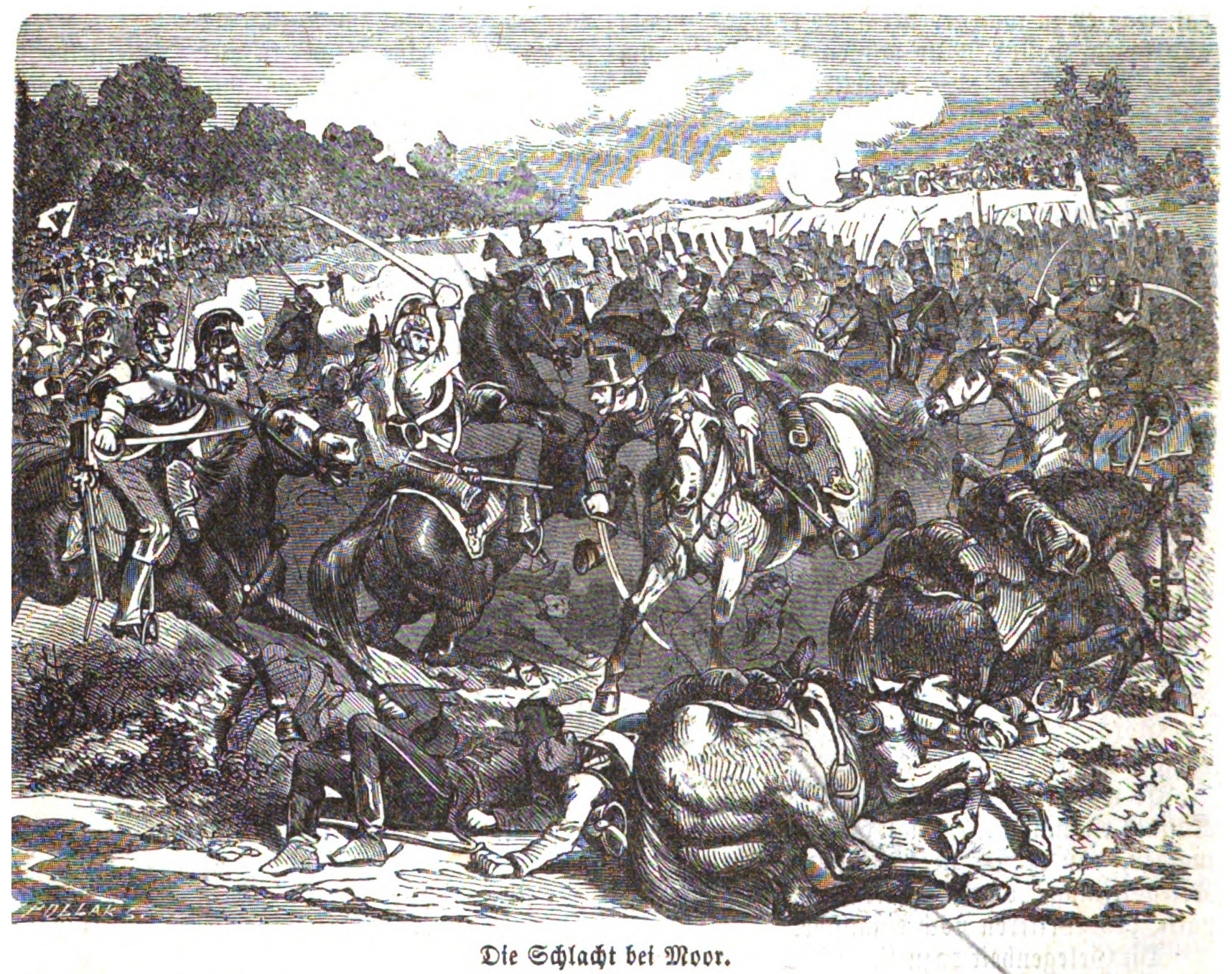
Battle of Mór. Fight between the Hungarian Hussars and Austrian Cuirassiers

At the end of the battle, the colonel squadron of the Wallmoden cuirassiers, which bypassed Mór joined behind the town with the lieutenant-colonel squadron of the same regiment, which crossed through the town. The Major squadron of the cuirassier regiment, under Ottinger's personal command, bypassed Mór on the left (to the southeast), together with a platoon of the 1st Company of the Colonel squadron led by Lieutenant Yates, and the 5th Half Cavalry Battery, continued the pursuit of the Hungarian troops. The 2nd Company of the Major squadron of the cuirassiers, led by Captain Edelsheim, got ahead of several companies of the 35th Battalion, which were retreating together, at a distance of one hour from Mór, and with the help of the 38-man platoon of the 3rd (Franz Joseph) Dragoons, led by Captain Farkas, which joined the pursuers although they were ordered to defend the guns, captured 450 men of the battalion. Meanwhile, the 1st Company of the Major squadron of the Wallmoden Cuirassiers assured their support.

The Hungarian troops on the right flank were led by the Chief of General Staff Ferenc Meszéna, who withdrew them through Pusztakápolna and Gánt towards Csákvár, shortly after the massive Austrian attack against the center. He may have been convinced to retreat by the fact that Jelačić sent the 3rd Dragoon Regiment, which had arrived in the meantime, to bypass the Hungarian right flank. Therefore, the retreat was not completely ordered, but it was carried out with great haste, during which some troop units broke up, and some units broke away from the army and retreated by other routes. The 6th company bypassed Mór and left the battlefield through the vineyards. Three cannons from the artillery "wandered through the woods and hills, mostly without roads", not under the command of the battery commander, Lieutenant Mike, but under the command of the commanding officer, Károly László, retreated through Kápolna and Gánt to Csákvár. Meszéna, according to his memoirs, gathered nearly 2,000 men from the retreating Hungarian forces on the way; however, this probably included also the 48th Battalion and the Bereg company. The 47th battalion arrived in Csákvár later in the evening, after Miklós Perczel's 48th Battalion. Görgei, who was on reconnaissance on the same day, met many of the fleeing soldiers from Mór. Those who fled from Mór poured to Pest in groups, and their appearance and their accounts about the defeat discouraged the Committee of National Defence (which was, de facto, the independent Hungarian government, after the open conflict with the Habsburgs started). On 31 December the Committee sent an order to Görgei to Buda.

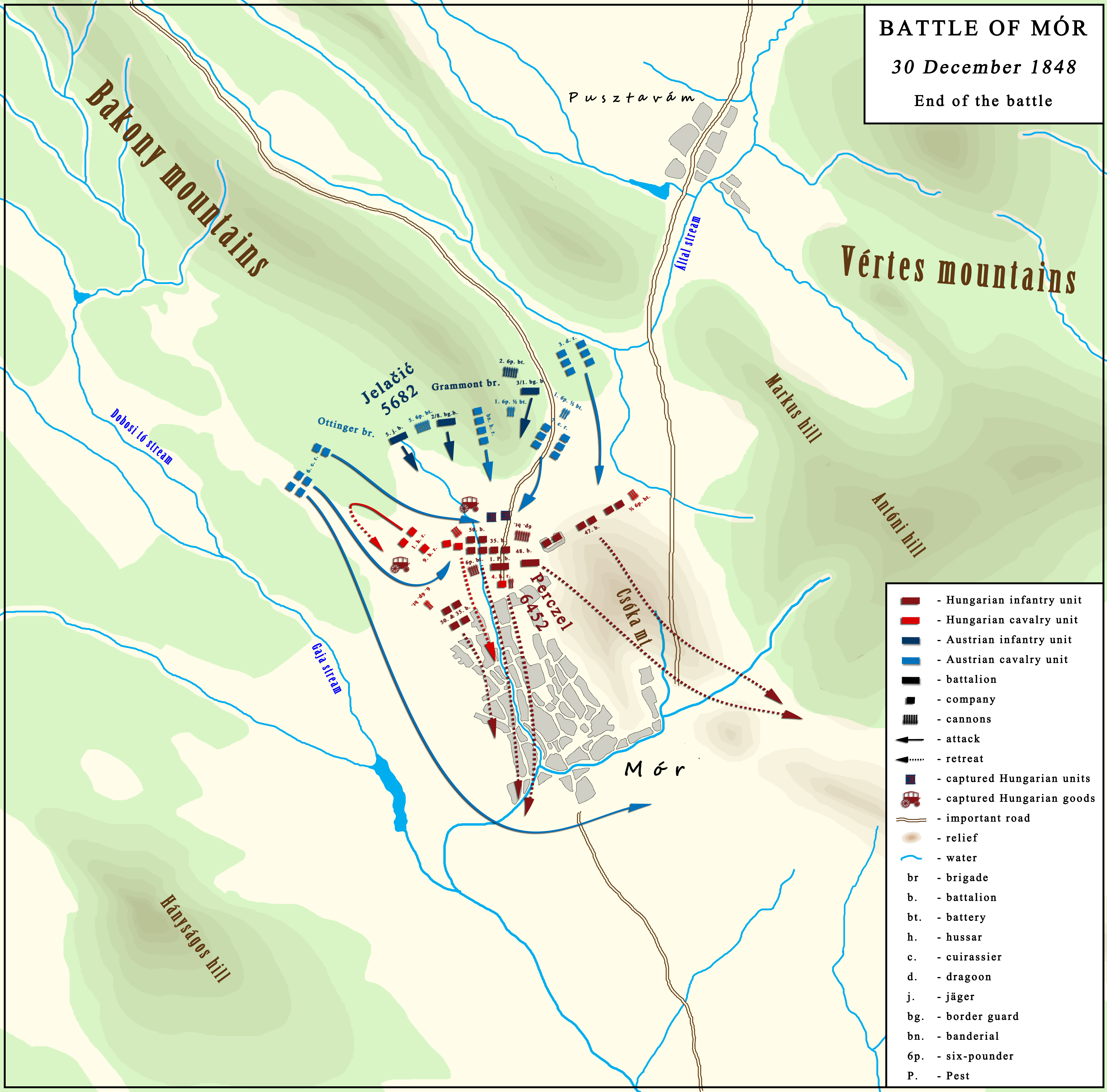
Battle of Mór 30 December 1848. End of the battle

The escape of the troops was helped also by the fact that the Hungarian Karger Brigade (1794 men, 10 guns), which arrived in Csákvár that day, advanced forward, despite some hesitation of the Brigade Commander. As a result, the enemy cavalry pursuing Perczel's infantry was forced to retreat by the 14th Battalion and its artillery, which repulsed their attack and then counterattacked. According to Zámbelly, Karger returned to Csákvár after receiving news of the defeat of the Perczel corps, and blocked the roads leading there from Mór with cut-down trees. As a result, the Hungarians who were fleeing had to deal not only with the cold and fatigue but also with the blocked roads.

A quarter of an hour later, they met Perczel, wearing a red hussar's cap, his face reflecting despair, as one witness wrote. The majority of the Hungarian cavalry and artillery, which escaped the pursuit of the Imperial Cavalry, then marched to Székesfehérvár under the lead of Mór Perczel. At 5 p.m. only Perczel's cavalry and 5 guns were in the town, and from the church tower he watched the countryside to see if the enemy was coming. After receiving the news that "the Germans are coming!", he continued his march to Seregélyes on 30 December. On 31 December Perczel sent his report to Kossuth from here and then retreated to Martonvásár hoping to contact the Karger Brigade. Major Horváth sent his report about the battle to Görgei from here.

At the moment the Hungarian left flank was crushed, a Hungarian formation appeared south of Mór. On 20 December, Kossuth had entrusted General Staff Major Bódog Nemegyei with the formation of a volunteer mobile militia in the Transdanubian counties. Nemegyei left Pest on 23 December. On the day of his departure, and on 26 December, he was given the task of disturbing the enemy from the rear with his troops. On 27 December, with some regular troops and three guns, he was in Csákvár and then headed south. On 29 December Kossuth also entrusted him with the leadership of the popular uprising in Veszprém County. On his way to Veszprém, he arrived at Mór, and seeing the disastrous situation of the Hungarian forces, lest his [yet] forming detachment be captured by the enemy's mobile units, he continued his march towards Veszprém. His appearance probably played a role in Jelačić's relatively early stopping of the pursuit of the fleeing Hungarian troops.

The battle was already decided when the vanguard of the Hartlieb division, the colonel squadron of the 3. (King of Saxony) cuirassier regiment, arrived on the battlefield. Having been informed that Perczel had received help (probably he heard about the advance of Karger's brigade, or about Nemegyei's detachment), Jelačić did not use the reinforcements which arrived, to launch another attack, but he halted his troops. But the whole of the Hartlieb Division did not arrive on the battlefield until 3 p.m. But, as seen before, even so, Jelačić's army captured a huge number of prisoners. A platoon of the 3rd Cuirassier Regiment led by Lieutenant Cadoudal and a part of the Banderial Hussars escorted the large number of prisoners to Vienna.

== Aftermath ==
A total of 32 fallen soldiers of both sides were buried in Mór in the Homoki Cemetery in a common grave. Captain Schaffgotsch was buried on 31 December; the coffin was carried by his comrades, and the funeral escort was provided by the second colonel squadron of the 3rd Cuirassier Regiment. Jelačić gave a "beautiful, moving and uplifting speech". A total of 350 wounded were treated in the military hospital and the Capuchin convent. On 1 January 1849, Jelačić sent another 300 prisoners of war from Mór to the headquarters and reported that the total number of prisoners of war was over 2,000. The number of prisoners and the number of captured cannons differs quite a lot between the Hungarian and the imperial sources: the most probable is that the Hungarian army lost 5 cannons. The Hungarian center lost half of the soldiers of many battalions, all in all, the whole army lost about 2000 men (mostly prisoners).

The primary cause for the defeat was Perczel's recklessness. He did not notify Görgei about the attack nor the commander of the nearest brigade of the Army of the Upper Danube, Lieutenant Colonel Ferdinand Karger. He gave the enemy the advantageous position in front of Mór, thus allowing the enemy to bypass his left flank. He was also late in entering the forest. The other reason was the composition of the forces on both sides. Jelačić's troops in battle did not exceed Perczel's in numbers, but his heavy cavalry outnumbered the Hungarian hussars by about three to one. In addition, Jelačić first attacked the Hungarian left flank, creating a local superiority. After the Hungarian left wing was crushed, the center and the right wing was forced to retreat. In a prolonged battle, Jelačić could have counted on the arrival of at least 7,000 troops from the Hartlieb division, so defeat was inevitable.

Kossuth knew that a drop of encouragement to attack would be enough for Perczel, especially if it meant that he could gain merit against Görgei. Kossuth could not see the war situation from Pest, and yet he sent orders for an attack in tactical detail, based often on his own imagination. In doing so, besides the wrong decisions he tried to enforce on his commanders, he was interfering with the military leadership.

The most important consequence of the defeat was that the Army of the Upper Danube led by Görgei had to take over the defense of all roads leading to the capital, thus overstretching its already very thin line. This made his defensive line so long that he had to concentrate his troops in the immediate vicinity of the capital. This led to the decision of the Committee of National Defence and the Parliament to evacuate the capital and move the seat of government to Debrecen. On the other hand, there was little chance of defending the capital even if Perczel defeated Jelačić, or his army remained intact. After all, the number of Hungarian troops to be massed in front of the capital was still significantly below that of Windisch-Grätz.

After the battle, the two men responsible for the defeat (Mór Perczel firstly and Lajos Kossuth secondly) blamed Görgei, saying that he had promised help, which he did not send to Perczel. Military historians have now disproved every part of this theory, and Görgei's troops could not have got there in time even if he had made such a promise.

In his memoirs, Mór Perczel writes that years before the battle, a fortune-telling Gypsy woman told the young Perczel to beware of his own name. Perczel, whose first name was Mór, understood what the warning meant only after the battle of Mór. This story has also taken root in Hungarian literature, as the writer Mór Jókai wrote down this anecdote in his short story Nomen et omen.

== Sources ==
- Bánlaky, József (2001). A magyar nemzet hadtörténelme (The Military History of the Hungarian Nation) (in Hungarian). Budapest: Arcanum Adatbázis.
- Gelich, Richárd (1883). Magyarország függetlenségi harcza 1848-49-ben ("The War of Independence of Hungary in 1848-49, vol. 2) (in Hungarian). Pest: Aigner Lajos.
- Hermann, Róbert (2011), "Perczel Mór dunántúli hadjárata és a móri ütközet ("The Transdanubian campaign of Mór Perczel and the Battle of Mór")" (PDF), Aetas 2001 (volume 16, nr. 2) (in Hungarian)
- Hermann, Róbert (2004), Az 1848–1849-es szabadságharc nagy csatái ("Great Battles of the Hungarian Revolution of 1848 – 1849") (in Hungarian), Zrínyi, ISBN 963-327-367-6
- Horváth, Gábor (2015), "December 30. – A móri ütközet ("30 December - The Battle of Mór")", győriszalon.hu 30.12.2015 (in Hungarian)
- Jókai, Mór, "Nomen et omen", Forradalmi és csataképek (in Hungarian), Budapest: Arcanum Adatbázis
- Nobili, Johann. Hungary 1848: The Winter Campaign. Edited and translated Christopher Pringle. Warwick, UK: Helion & Company Ltd., 2021.
- Rüstow, Friedrich Wilhelm (1866), Az 1848-1849-diki magyar hadjárat története vol. II. ("The History of the Hungarian Campaign from 1848-1849, vol. 2.) (PDF) (in Hungarian), Pest: Emich Gusztáv
