= Ferenc Ottinger =

Hungarian revolutionary general

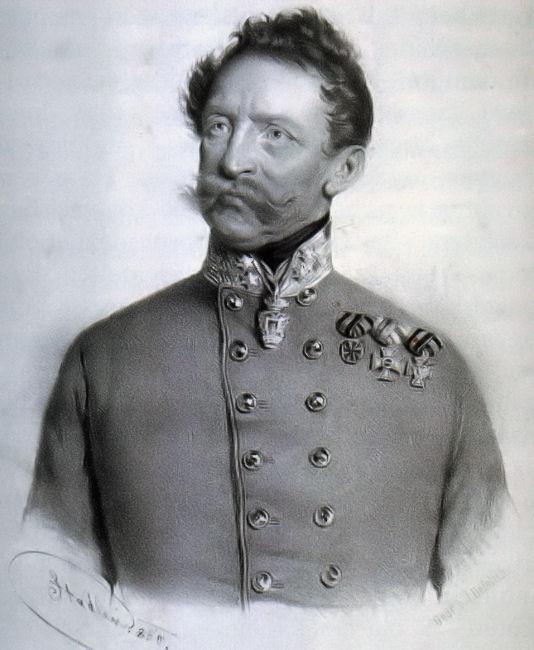
- An 1850 lithograph of Ottinger by Johann Stadler
- Born: 1792; Sopron
- Died: 8 April 1869 (aged 76–77); Vienna
- Military career
- Allegiance: Revolutionary Hungarian Army
- Rank: General
- Battles: Napoleonic Wars; Hungarian Revolution of 1848; Battle of Bábolna; Battle of Mór; Battle of Szolnok
- Awards: Military Order of Maria Theresa

Baron Ferenc Ottinger (Sopron, 1792 – Vienna, 8 April 1869) was a Lieutenant General to Franz Josef I of Austria, a Cavalry General and one of the leading generals in the Hungarian Revolution of 1848.

== Career ==
In 1814 and 1815 as lieutenant on the Emperor's side he fought in the Napoleonic Wars in Italy. From 1839 until 1846 Ottinger was the Captain of the Emperor's 1st Army. In 1848, at the start of the Hungarian Revolution, Ottinger was a Brigadier and Major General in Buda.

After the Batthyány Government formed, it offered him a post as Secretary of War, but he rejected it. Until the government nominated Lázár Mészáros as Secretary of War, Ottinger was the Ministry of Defence's council chairman. In 1848 he became the captain of the Hungarian army at Dráva, against Josip Jelačić. When the conflict started Ottinger lost faith and decamped to Jelačić.

After that — on the side of the Emperor — Ottinger fought in many battles. On 28 December 1848 he won a battle against Kornél Görgey at Bábolna. With Ottinger's contribution the Emperor's Army won the Battle of Mór on 30 December 1848. Ferenc Ottinger lost the battle against Mór Perczel on 22 January 1849 at Szolnok. In the Battle of Káty on 7 June 1849 Ottinger destroyed the 8th Army and received the Military Order of Maria Theresa medal and the title of Baron.

After the Revolution Ottinger was a Lieutenant General and in 1866 he retired as a Cavalry General.
