= Battle of Cegléd =

Battle during Hungarian Revolution of 1848

Coordinates: 47°10′22.5″N 19°48′08.0″E

- Part of the Hungarian Revolution of 1848
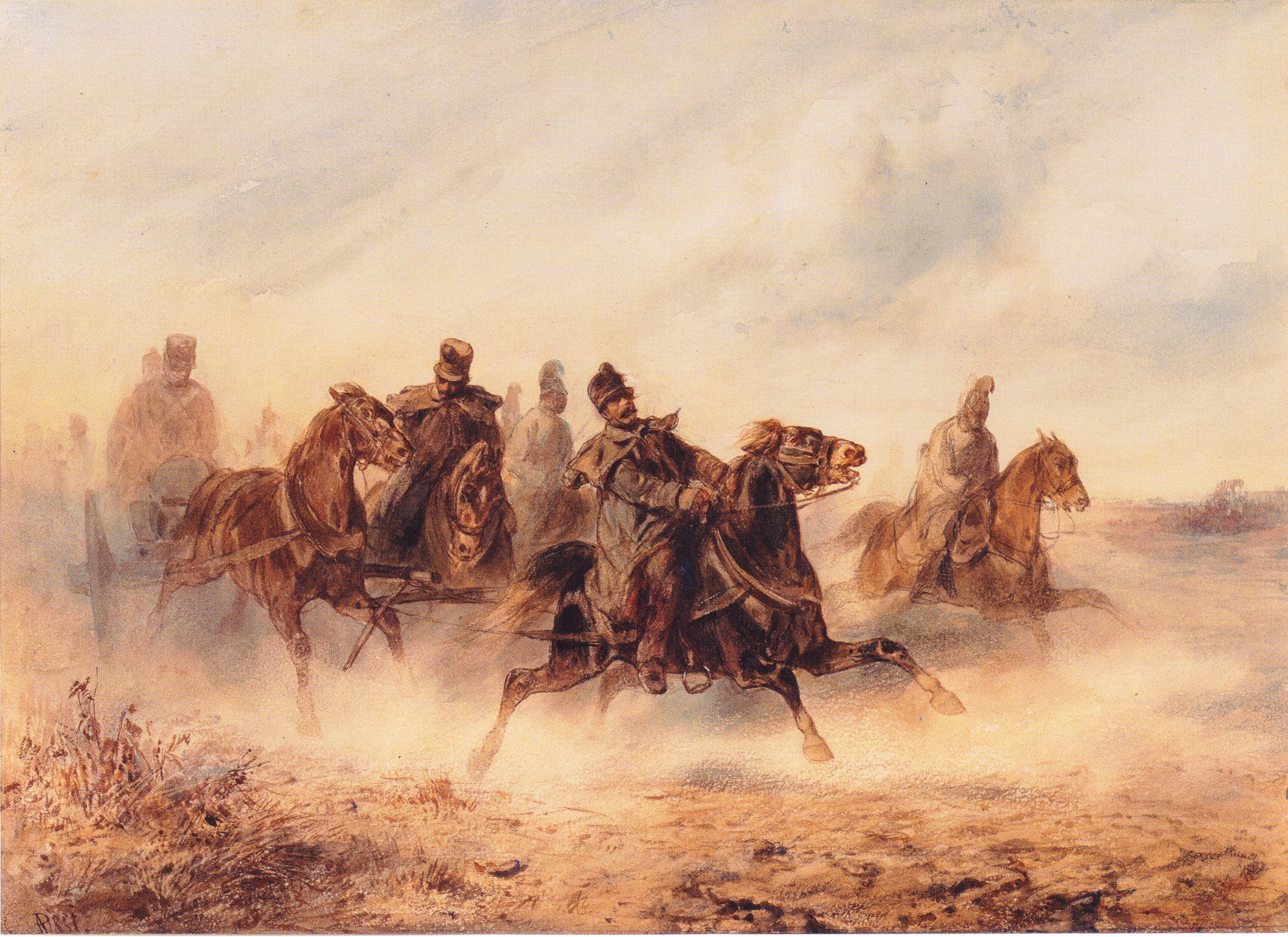
- Retreating Austrian artillery from the Battle of Cegléd
Date	25 January 1849
Location	Cegléd, Pest-Pilis-Solt-Kiskun County, Kingdom of Hungary
Result	Hungarian victory

Belligerents
Hungarian Revolutionary Army	Austrian Empire

Commanders and leaders
Mór Perczel	Ferenc Ottinger

Strength
17,839 men (in reality only the cavalry and artillery of the Hungarians participated in the battle: ~2,500 men); 66 cannons	2,762 men 18 cannons

Casualties and losses
1 dead 2 wounded	6 dead 15 wounded 22 missing or captured 78 horses (these are the aggregated numbers of the Austrian losses of the First Battle of Szolnok and the Battle of Cegléd)

The Battle of Cegléd was a battle in the Hungarian war of Independence of 1848-1849, fought on 25 January 1849 between the revolutionary Hungarian army led by General Mór Perczel against the cavalry brigade of the Austrian Empire led by General Ferenc Ottinger. After the First Battle of Szolnok Ottinger retreated to Cegléd and received some infantry reinforcements to his cavalry brigade. Perczel decided to continue his attack, and when Ottinger felt that he was about to be encircled by the Hungarian troops, decided to retreat from the battlefield. Thus this battle was confined merely to an artillery duel, ending in an Austrian retreat. Perczel's victories at Szolnok and Cegléd, were the first important Hungarian successes in the Western theater against the main Austrian army after the start of their offensive against Hungary in mid-December 1848, panicking the Imperial-Royal army's commandment in Pest, forcing it to call back the bulk of their troops which were pursuing Artúr Görgei's Upper Danube Corps in Northern Hungary.

== Background ==
After the victory at Szolnok the Hungarian cavalry chased Ferenc Ottinger's Austrian Imperial-Royal (K.u.K.) Cavalry Brigade as far as Abony. The retreating troops of Ferenc Ottinger arrived at Abony at 7 pm on 22 January, but the general, fearing that the Hungarians would attack at night, did not stop there either, but retreated with his troops to Cegléd, where he arrived at 12 am. So the Hungarian success was complete, as the Imperial Royal Cavalry Brigade was forced to abandon Szolnok, but it did not stopped even at Abony, retreating as far as Cegléd.

== Prelude ==
General Mór Perczel's plan was partly to operate towards Gyöngyös and Tiszafüred, partly to facilitate Artúr Görgei's retreat through northern Hungary towards the Tisza, and partly to prevent the enemy from advancing along the Tiszafüred road.

Perczel remained in Szolnok on 23 and 24 January, and the next day he issued his instructions for the continuation of the advance. According to the instructions, on 25 January the division of Lieutenant Colonel Miklós Hertelendy was to leave Abony at 10 o'clock in the morning and attack Cegléd from the front. The right flank of the division was to be covered by a cavalry company. This division was joined by Major Miklós Perczel's infantry brigade. The division from Törtel, led by Lieutenant Colonel Lajos Kazinczy, also had to set off at 10 o'clock, and attack, with a slight turn from the road to Nagykőrös, in line with Hertelendy.

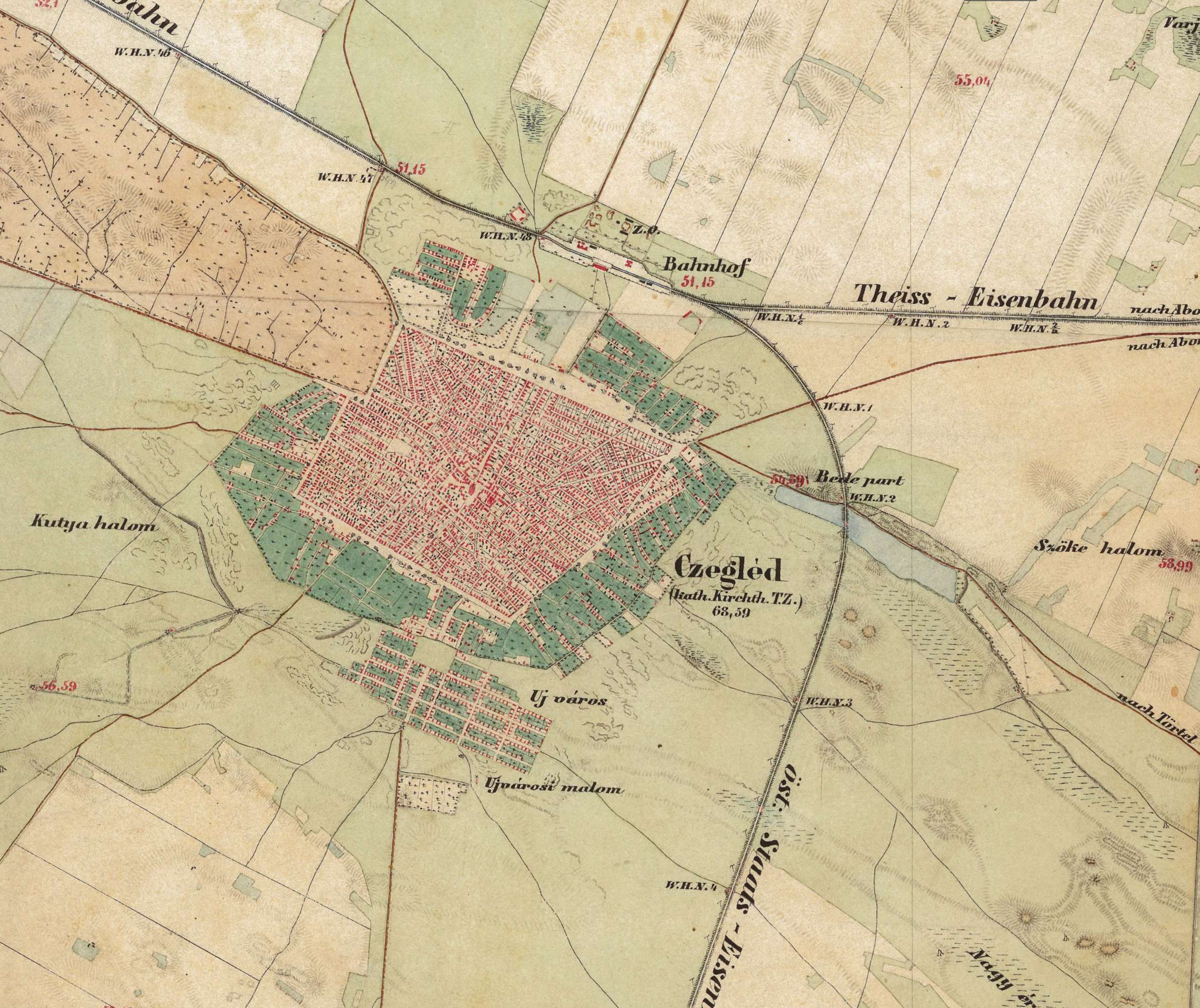
Map of Cegléd on the middle of the 19th century

Hertelendy had to give the signal for the attack by three cannon shots. The main force, under Perczel's personal command, had to move at 6 a.m. in order to support the two divisions in the lead in case they met a superior enemy on their way. If the enemy would have taken up a position in front of Cegléd or would have received reinforcements, the divisions from the front would also have to wait for the main forces. Perczel's orders were to use the infantry for attack, through the city's side streets, and to counter the artillery with artillery. According to his battle plan, cavalry could only be used to cover the flanks or as reserves. Perczel calculated that if the enemy would get infantry reinforcements and Kazinczy's division encountered a larger force, he would take the shortest path to the Abony-Cegléd road and send a signal to Hertelendy to hurry ahead of him.

But war plans rarely turn out as the generals intended, and that is what happened also in this case.

On 23 January Major General Ottinger's brigade was already stationed in Cegléd, where the six companies of the 5th Kaiserjäger Battalion, which had left Pest that morning, had also arrived. In his report from the same day, Ottinger also requested a cavalry battery, some cavalry reinforcements, so that he could clear the hither bank of the Tisza from the enemy. On 24 January, another battalion of grenadiers and some artillery left the capitals for Cegléd. Ottinger also asked for instructions to conduct offensive actions if he saw it as advantageous. Ottinger was therefore not yet aware of the huge Hungarian superiority.

Major General Ottinger did not wait for Perczel's attack in Cegléd, but took up a position in front of the town, towards Abony, with his two regiments of cuirassiers and his artillery.

Cegléd was a large country town of 17,000 inhabitants, with a small urbanized core, a wide rural belt, and large gardens, and was therefore not suitable for sustained defense by a cavalry brigade.

=== Opposing forces ===
The Hungarian army

Corps	Troop	Brigade	Leader	Men	Horses	Cannons
Perczel's Corps; General Mór Perczel	Vanguard; Lieutenant Colonel Miklós Hertelendy	1. Brigade	Major Ignác Mándy	915	913	3
Perczel's Corps; General Mór Perczel	Vanguard; Lieutenant Colonel Miklós Hertelendy	2. Brigade	Major Károly Mihály	1,752	90	9
Perczel's Corps; General Mór Perczel	Vanguard; Lieutenant Colonel Miklós Hertelendy	Brigade total		2,667	1,003	12
Perczel's Corps; General Mór Perczel	Main troop Lieutenant Colonel István Szekulics	3. Brigade	Major Luigi Venturini	3,795	70	6
Perczel's Corps; General Mór Perczel	Main troop Lieutenant Colonel István Szekulics	4. Brigade	Major Alexander Buttler	3,925	90	8
Perczel's Corps; General Mór Perczel	Main troop Lieutenant Colonel István Szekulics	Brigade total		7,720	160	14
Perczel's Corps; General Mór Perczel	Rearguard; Major Miklós Perczel	5. Brigade	Major Miklós Perczel	2,802	390	8
Corps total				13,189	1,553	34
Troops from the Reserve Corps		I. Brigade	Lieutenant Colonel Lajos Kazinczy	1,750	400	14
Troops from the Reserve Corps		II. Brigade	Major Károly Albrich	2,900	648	18
Grand total				17,839	2,601	66

In reality, only the cavalry and artillery of the Hungarians participated in the battle, around 2500 men. The infantry could not reach in time on the battlefield before the end of the battle.

The Austrians:

Unit	Men	Horses	Cannons
6th (Wallmoden) Cuirassier Regiment	786	786	-
7th (Hardegg) Cuirassier Regiment	580	580	-
5th Kaiserjäger Battalion	1,076	-	-
1st Cavalry Battery	120	140	6
5th Cavalry Battery	120	140	6
17th Congreve Rocket Battery	100	100	6
Total	2,762	1,746	18

== Battle ==
On 25 January, the advancing Hungarian troops set off towards Cegléd in a terribly strong wind, and according to one witness, the snow had completely melted.

On the morning of 25 January, Ottinger sent a platoon of the 7th (Hardegg) Cuirassier Regiment under Lieutenant Colonel Riess on a reconnaissance mission towards Abony. The platoon encountered a Hussar troop at about 9 a.m., which was repulsed, but then realized that the Hussar troop was in fact the advance guard of the advancing Hungarian army.

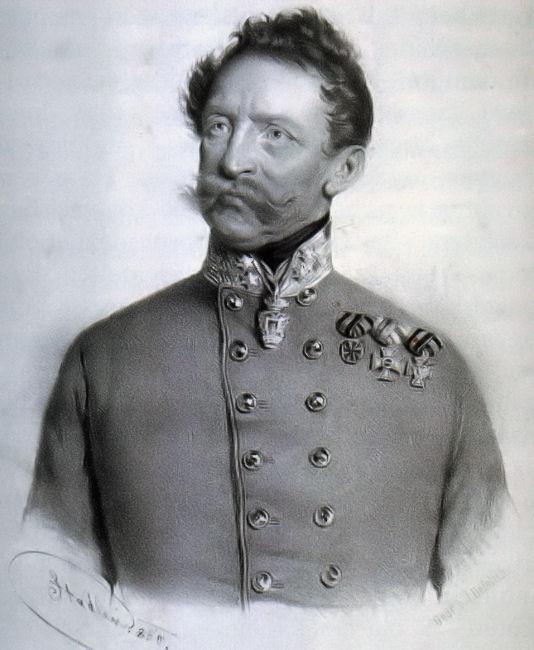
Ottinger Ferenc

According to the regimental history of the Hardegg Regiment, Riess immediately called for reinforcements and then maneuvered his single platoon to deceive the Hungarians, buying, in this way, time for Ottinger to deploy his whole brigade. However the history of the cuirassier regiment was wrong because it was not the 30-40 cavalrymen who forced the Hungarian brigade to retreat, but probably the fact that the cavalry of the Hertelendy division was too advanced, and because of this, it had to wait for the infantry and artillery to arrive.

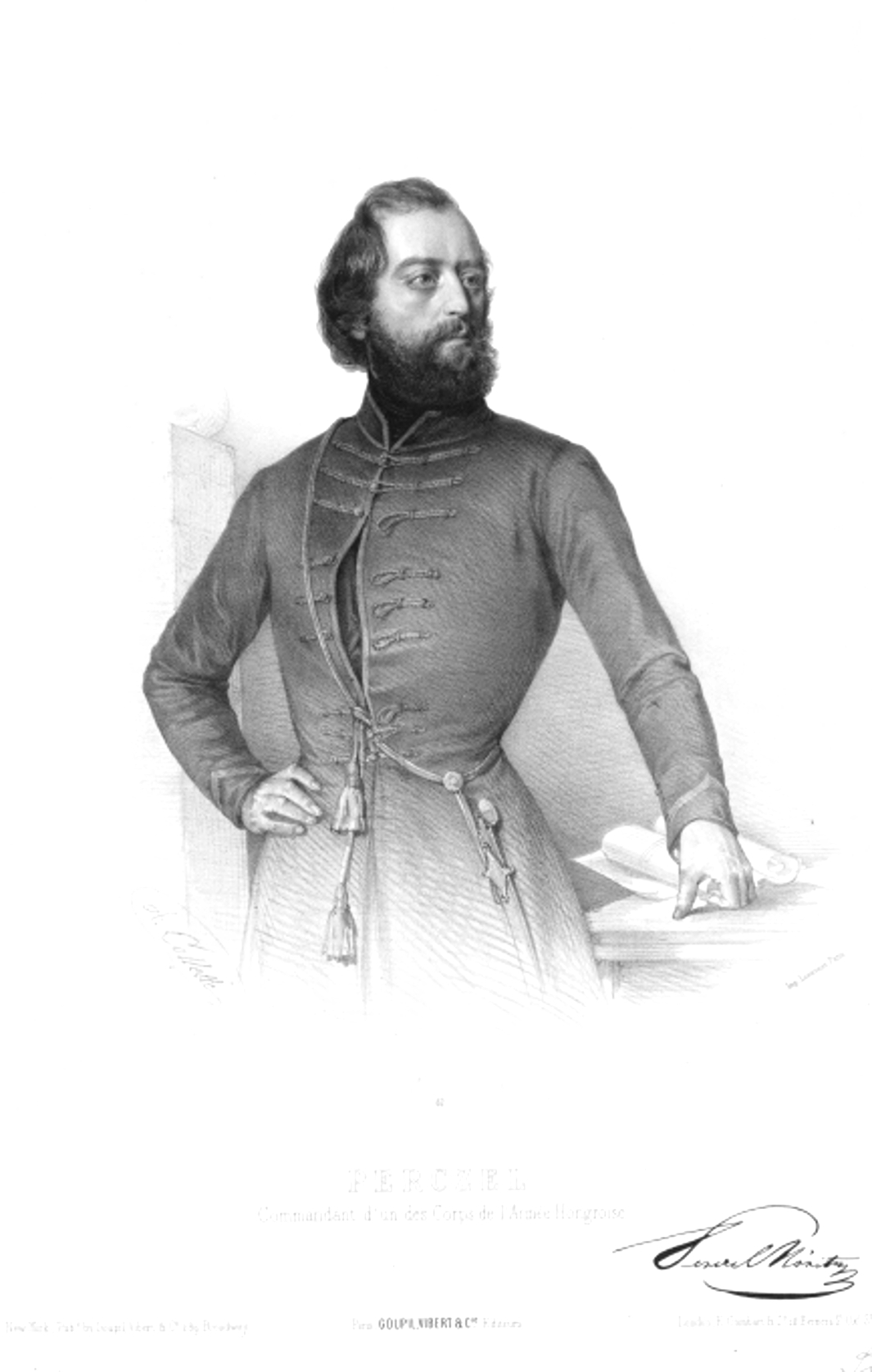
Perczel Mór 1848

Ottinger deployed four companies of the Hardegg Cuirassiers on the southern side of the Abony-Cegléd road, three guns of the cavalry battery on the road, and six companies of the 6th (Wallmoden) Cuirassier Regiment on the northern side of the road. The deployment was completed by 11 a.m. According to the history of the Hardegg regiment, two companies of the same regiment were stationed in front of the railway station, northwest of the Wallmoden cuirassiers. However, the works about the 6th (Wallmoden) Cuirassier Regiment contradict this, and state that the Lieutenant-Colonel's Squadron of the same Regiment was the cuirassier troop which stationed there. The Austrian extreme right wing was secured by a cavalry half-battery. The railway station was defended by four companies of the 5th Kaiserjäger Battalion. Already after the battle had begun, a battalion of grenadiers and a cavalry battery arrived by rail from Pest. Half of the cavalry battery was successfully unloaded and sent into the firing line.

The battle began outside the town with an artillery duel and lasted about 2-2.30 hours. The Imperial Royal artillery started to fire while the Hungarians were still at distance. Ottinger had 9 guns including the half cavalry battery which just arrived, while the Hungarians - according to the Imperial sources - had 14. If there were indeed 14, that means that apart from the artillery of the Hertelendy division only a part of the Perczel brigade's guns took part in the firing duel. However, the projectiles of the Imperial Royal Artillery did not do much damage to the Hungarians: they either flew over their heads or hit the ground in front of them. Only one company of the 9th (Miklós) Hussar Regiment was hit by a shell, causing several casualties.

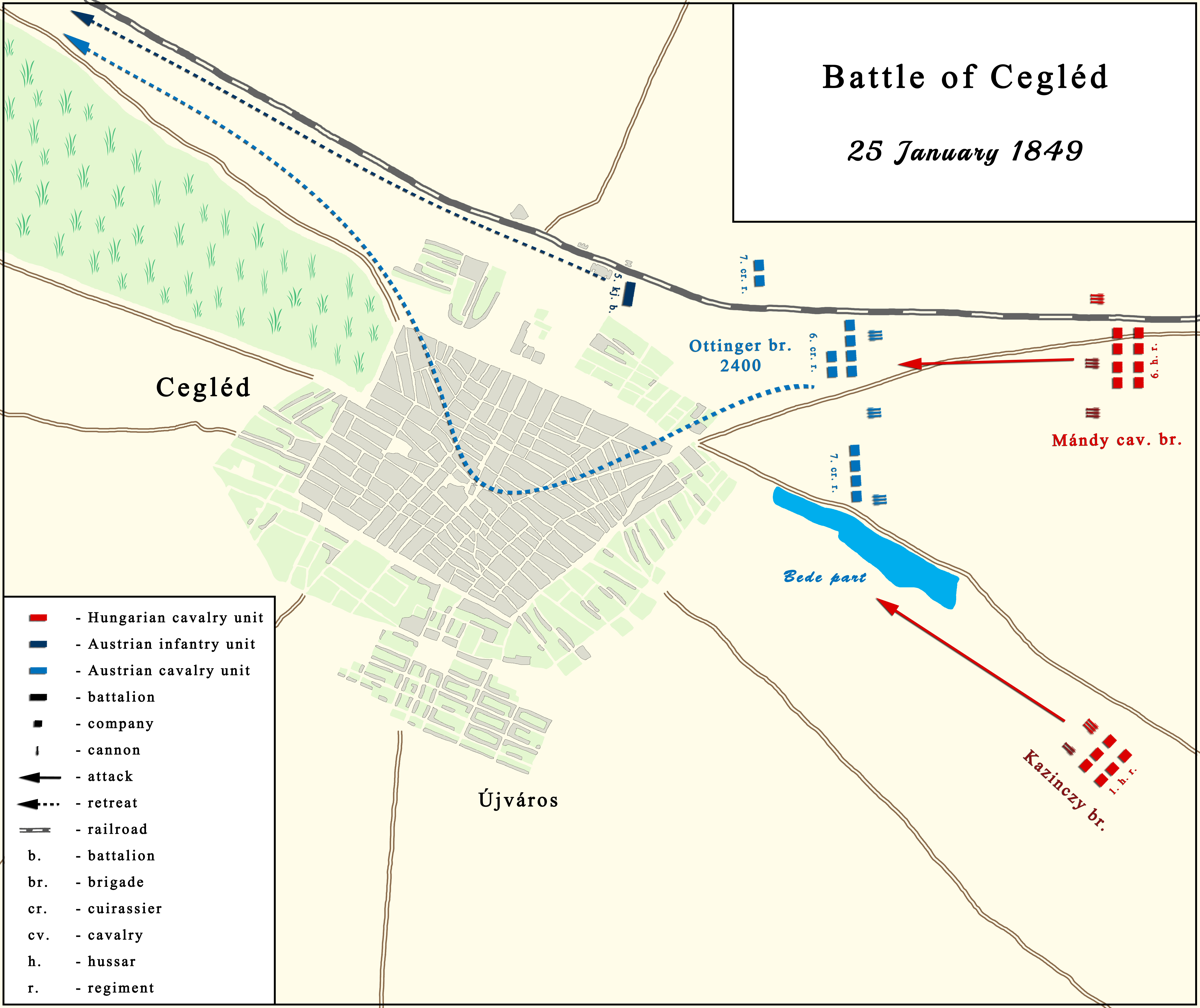
Battle of Cegléd - 25 January 1849

Ottinger was almost thinking of launching an attack with the Hardegg cuirassiers when at about 1 p.m. a Hungarian battery appeared on the right flank of the K.u.K. Brigade and started firing at the cuirassiers. This must have been the artillery of the column led by Kazinczy. Ottinger then received a report that the Hungarians had bypassed his right flank and were threatening his way of retreat. He, therefore, sent the infantry by rail to Alberti (then a separate locality, now a part of Albertirsa), and retreated with the cuirassier to Cegléd. According to the chronicler of the Hardegg cuirassiers, Ottinger passed through the town at a gallop, then repositioned his cavalry between Ceglédbercel and Cegléd, and retreated to Alberti. The Hungarian war report and Ottinger's report from Alberti, however, point to a rather disorganized retreat. In the latter, Ottinger wrote that the Hungarians had fired with twelve-pound cannons, i.e. guns of large caliber and range, at his troops, forcing him to retreat, even though the Hungarian troops did not have twelve-pounder guns. This means that the Hungarian guns worked so well that Ottinger was fooled into thinking that they were firing with large caliber guns.

The K.u.K. artillery took up position again on the outskirts of Cegléd, firing three shots per gun, but when the Hungarian left flank started an encircling maneuver, the Austrians retreated through the town. The Hungarian artillery pursued them as far as the vineyards behind the town, and the cavalry to Irsa (then, a separate locality, now, a part of Albertirsa). To those Hungarians who returned from the pursuit, the people of the town brought wine in canteens, bottles and pots.

However, what the sources about the battle are completely silent about, is the Hungarian infantry. This means that the infantry never arrived on the battlefield. If the brigades started their march at 10 o'clock, as Perczel had ordered, the infantry would have reached the battlefield at around 1 p.m., but rather later. In other words, by the time they arrived, the battle was over. It seems from the sources that only the infantry of the Perczel brigade arrived in the immediate vicinity of the battlefield, but they were only spectators and not participants in the battle, which was mainly limited to an artillery duel.

== Aftermath ==
According to some sources, the only Hungarian casualty was one: an artilleryman who had enlisted the day before in Abony. In addition, two hussar horses were lost, and some hussars were reportedly wounded. According to the report of Lajos Kollár, the Békés County Commissioner, from 30 January, the Hungarian losses were two dead and 8-10 wounded, while the K.u.K. troops lost 70-80 dead and wounded and 40 horses. Perczel wrote that many prisoners and horses fell into our hands. According to artilleryman Károly László, the Austrians lost 4-5 dead, several wounded, and 8-9 horses.

Ottinger left behind the Kaiserjäger battalion and two companies of the Wallmoden cuirassiers at Ceglédbercel, and the rest of his troops joined the troops sent to his aid from the capital at Alberti. Here, Major General Karl Zeisberg, Josip Jelačić's corps' chief of staff, took command. Zeisberg himself called for reinforcements and believed that the Hungarians not only wanted to retake Szolnok but were seeking to advance further. The events at Szolnok and Cegléd had caused great concern to the K.u.K. main commander, Field Marshal Alfred I, Prince of Windisch-Grätz, who believed that the Hungarian main army had been reorganized behind the Tisza and was preparing for a decisive attack against his troops. This was the reason why, on the same day, 23 January, he gave strict orders to Lieutenant-General Anton Csorich, who was in pursuit of Artúr Görgei's Upper Danube Army, to march immediately to Pest with two brigades, where the number of troops was alarmingly reduced by Lieutenant-General Schulzig's troops’ departure to 12 battalions, 14 companies of cavalry and 105 guns. In the meantime, the prince also resorted to a very successful stratagem, by ordering Csorich, who had reached Kápolna by this time, to announce as plausibly as possible, by sending a detachment to Poroszló, that an Austrian corps of 10,000 men, with 30 guns, would be coming there soon.

Then, when on the evening of January 25, news arrived that Ottinger had been attacked for the second time at Cegléd and had been forced to retreat from there, despite the help of the reinforcements sent by him, Windisch-Grätz's anxiety reached its climax and he immediately arranged for the forces concentrated in the capital to leave 2 battalions behind and set off immediately, partly by rail and partly on foot, for Alberti; the 6th battalion, which had been raiding around Székesfehérvár, Esztergom and the Bakony forest, was to be sent to the city of Pest to partially replace the aforementioned forces that had been moved out of Pest against Perczel's troops. In addition, a request was sent to Field Marshal Laval Nugent von Westmeath, who was operating along the Dráva, to direct one of his brigades to Pest without delay.

After the battle of Szolnok, Lieutenant-General Henryk Dembiński, who had arrived from Paris a few days earlier, joined Perczel's camp. Lajos Kossuth sent him to the camp to inspect Perczel's corps, with the long-term intention of appointing Dembiński as the commander of the Hungarian Honvéd Army. Perczel intended to continue his advance after the successes at Szolnok and Cegléd, but in his report of 26 January he announced that he was withdrawing his army to Szolnok.

The Hungarian Ministry of War, on the basis of two reports that later proved to be false, ordered Perczel to send a division from his corps to stop the 4,000–5,000 enemy threatening the bridge at Tiszafüred. The reports about the enemy troops were proven false, and Perczel wanted to continue his advance, but Dembiński, who was in charge of this division, insisted on sending it nevertheless. On 27 January the two generals had a bad quarrel, as a result of which Perczel resigned, and Dembiński took over the division and marched with it towards Tokaj. Perczel's corps was first temporarily taken over by Lieutenant-Colonel Miklós Hertelendy, and then permanently by Mihály Répásy. The corps also left Szolnok before Répásy's arrival, on Dembiński's orders, and, to Kossuth's deep indignation, set fire to the Tisza bridge behind it.

On the afternoon of 26 January, Prince Windisch-Grätz, fearing an attack by the Hungarian main troops, travelled to Üllő, where he soon received the reassuring news that the Hungarians had not only not advanced west to Cegléd, but on the contrary had retreated towards Abony, pursued by the Ottinger and Gramont Brigades. Under these circumstances, Windisch-Grätz himself, leaving the observation and pursuit of the opposing Hungarian army to the command of Ban of Croatia Josip Jelačić, returned to Buda on the evening of 27 January, where he had just a few hours earlier sent 2 battalions of grenadiers, so that here again 7 battalions were available, despite the fact that the brigade expected from Nugent had in the meantime been directed not to Pest but to Kaposvár, from where it marched with the rest of the troops of its own corps to Pécs at the end of January.

Jelačić entrusted the pursuit of the retreating Hungarians (which turned into a simple observation) to Lieutenant-General Hartlieb, who, on 28 January, arrived at Szolnok and occupied it with 3 battalions, 9 companies of cavalry and 12 cannons, sending at the same time a small detachment to Poroszló, and another to Kecskemét, and had the partially burnt Tisza bridge there rebuilt, but sent only small scouting detachments across the river to the left bank.

Perczel's campaign was of great psychological significance, as a Hungarian army, after two months of constant retreats and mostly lost defensive battles, finally showed its strength in attack. On the other hand, by seeming to threaten the capital, which Windisch-Grätz considered so important, this campaign also forced the enemy to weaken his forces at other points. This undoubtedly made Görgei's retreat easier, although the Upper Danube Corps had already slipped through the encircling Imperial troops by the time Csorich was ordered back.

== Sources ==
- Bánlaky, József (2001). A magyar nemzet hadtörténelme ("The Military History of the Hungarian Nation) (in Hungarian). Budapest: Arcanum Adatbázis.
- Bóna, Gábor (1987). Tábornokok és törzstisztek a szabadságharcban 1848–49 ("Generals and Staff Officers in the War of Freedom 1848–1849") (in Hungarian). Budapest: Zrínyi Katonai Kiadó. p. 430. ISBN 963-326-343-3.
- Hermann, Róbert (2001), 1848-1849 a szabadságharc hadtörténete ("Military History of 1848-1849") (in Hungarian), Budapest: Korona, ISBN 963-9376-21-3
- Hermann, Róbert (2004). Az 1848–1849-es szabadságharc nagy csatái ("Great battles of the Hungarian Revolution of 1848-1849") (in Hungarian). Budapest: Zrínyi. p. 408. ISBN 963-327-367-6.
- Hermann, Róbert (2013). Nagy csaták. 15. A magyar önvédelmi háború ("Great Battles. 15. The Hungarian War od Self Defense") (in Hungarian). Budapest: Duna Könyvklub. p. 88. ISBN 978-615-5013-99-7.
- Horváth, Gábor (2021), "Január 22. – Az első szolnoki ütközet (1849) ("22 January - The First Battle of Szolnok")", győriszalon.hu 22.01.2022 (in Hungarian)
