= Perczel =

Perczel is a Hungarian surname.

Perczel may refer to:

- András Perczel (b. 1959), Hungarian biochemist and professor at the Hungarian Academy of Sciences
- Béla Perczel (1819–1888), Hungarian politician who served as Minister of Justice between 1875 and 1878
- Dezső Perczel (1848–1913), Hungarian politician who served as Interior Minister between 1895 and 1899
- Miklós Perczel (1812–1904), Hungarian military officer in the Revolution of 1848 and colonel in the American Civil War
- Mór Perczel (1811–1899), Hungarian leader and general in the Revolution of 1848
