= First Battle of Szolnok =

Battle during Hungarian Revolution of 1848

Coordinates: 47°10′08.7″N 20°09′52.0″E

Second Battle of Szolnok
- Part of the Hungarian Revolution of 1848
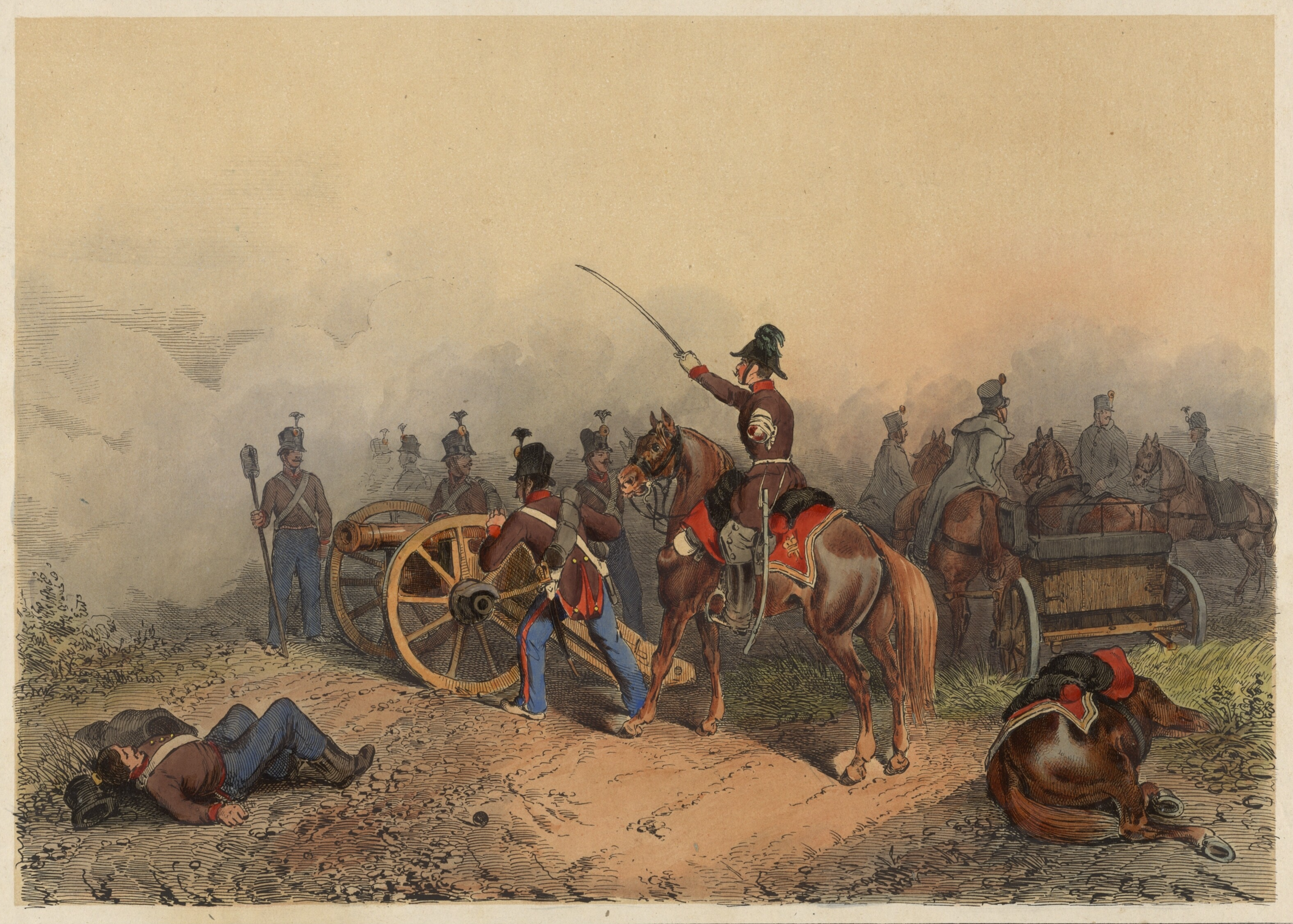
- First Battle of Szolnok (Austrian artillery)
Date	22 January 1849
Location	Szolnok, Szolnok County, Kingdom of Hungary
Result	Hungarian victory

Belligerents
Hungarian Revolutionary Army	Austrian Empire

Commanders and leaders
Mór Perczel	Ferenc Ottinger

Strength
17,839 men 66 cannons	1,586 men 12 cannons

Casualties and losses
4 dead 3 wounded 6 missing or captured	?

The First Battle of Szolnok was a battle in the Hungarian war of Independence of 1848-1849, fought on 22 January 1849 between the revolutionary Hungarian army led by General Mór Perczel against the cavalry brigade of the Austrian Empire led by General Ferenc Ottinger. The isolated troops of Ottinger were attacked by Perczel's superior army and were forced to retreat from Szolnok to Abony, then to Cegléd. This Hungarian victory was a sign that the Austrian troops, which after the occupation of the Hungarian capitals of Pest and Buda, believed that they already won the war, were far away from reaching that goal, and that the Hungarian army could cause them unpleasant surprises. After the Battle Perczel's troops continued the pursuit of Ottinger's troops to Cegléd.

== Background ==
On 30 December 1848, General Mór Perczel suffered a disastrous defeat in the Battle of Mór, mainly due to his own lack of caution and poor choice of battlefield. His corps was virtually entirely crushed by a smaller Imperial force, which included Major General Ferenc Ottinger's cavalry brigade. After the defeat, Perczel retreated towards Pest, where the main army led by General Artúr Görgei, retreating from Győr, also arrived. Here, on 2 January, a general military council decided on a new strategy. According to the battle plan, Görgei handed over some troops to Perczel, then marched through Vác - where he issued his famous Declaration of Vác - to secure the mining towns in Northern Hungary and relieve Lipótvár.

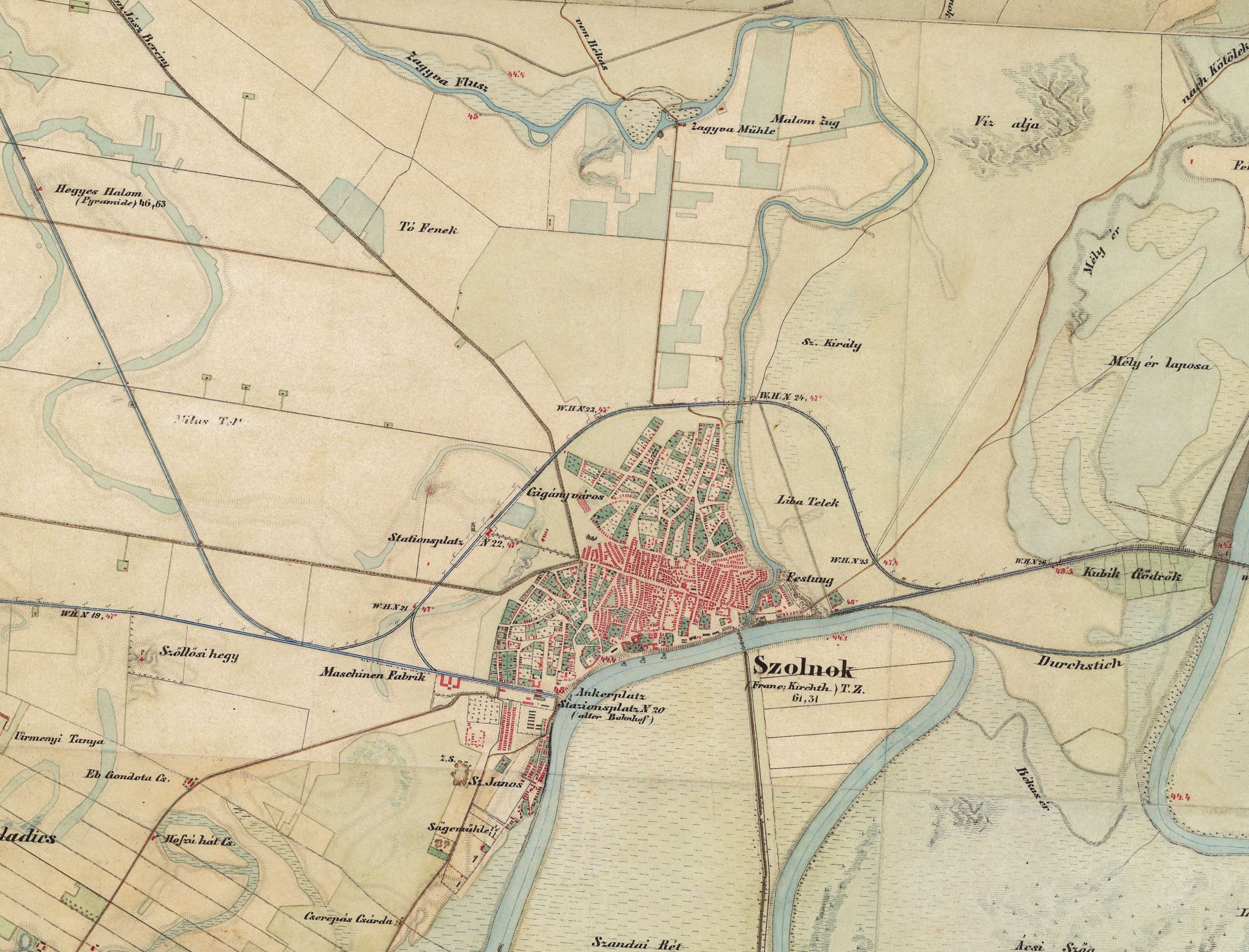
Map of Szolnok on the middle of the 19th century

Mór Perczel's corps, the Central Mobile Army, was given the task by the decision of the War Council of 2 January 1849 to defend the capital during its evacuation, and then to slowly retreat to Szolnok, and repel the eventual Austrian attacks, transporting all war material to a safe place. Perczel's troops left Pest on the night of 4 to 5 January, but he himself did not leave the capital until noon on the 5th. His army then arrived in Cegléd on the Üllő-Monor-Albertirsa route on 7 January.

At the military council held in Szolnok, Colonel József Kohlmann proposed to defend the Tisza line, but Perczel rejected this proposal, as the river had ceased to be an obstacle to the enemy's crossing due to the freezing of the Tisza; and so, instead of defending the river line directly, he preferred a central position further back, from where he could easily attack any enemy appearing at any crossing point of the Tisza from Szolnok to Polgár. So on 13 January he left Szolnok. And he continued his retreat, and on 15 January he was already in Karcag with his army. On 14 January, Perczel deployed his right wing under General Mihály Répássy at Tiszaújváros, his center at Nádudvar, and his left wing under his own command at Karcag.

But no one was pursuing Perczel. After the capture of the capital, the high commander of the Austrian armies Field Marshal Alfred I, Prince of Windisch-Grätz was convinced that the Hungarian Revolution would be over within weeks, the Hungarian army would be disbanded and the troops belonging to the line regiments, which joined the Hungarian army would slowly return to the imperial flag. Apart from the fortresses within Hungary, the only thing that interested the imperial commander-in-chief was Görgei's army, and he sent the bulk of his mobile forces to pursue it.

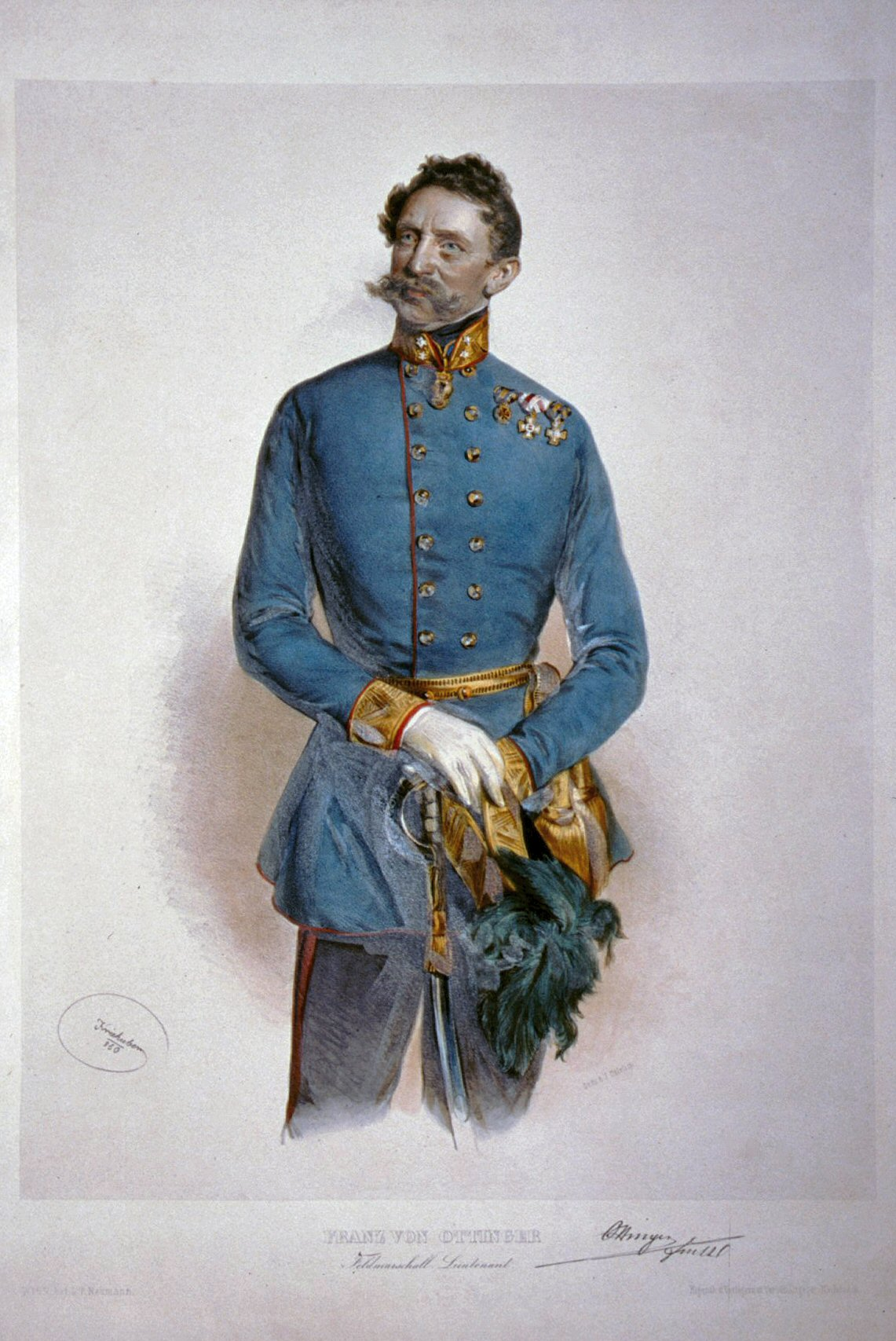
Franz von Ottinger Litho

Thus, there were not enough soldiers left for the main line of attack towards Debrecen. After the occupation of the capitals and after he had sent Lieutenant General Anton Csorich to pursue Görgei, and after other minor deployments, Windisch-Grätz had only 18 battalions, 31 companies of cavalry, and 126 cannons left in Pest.

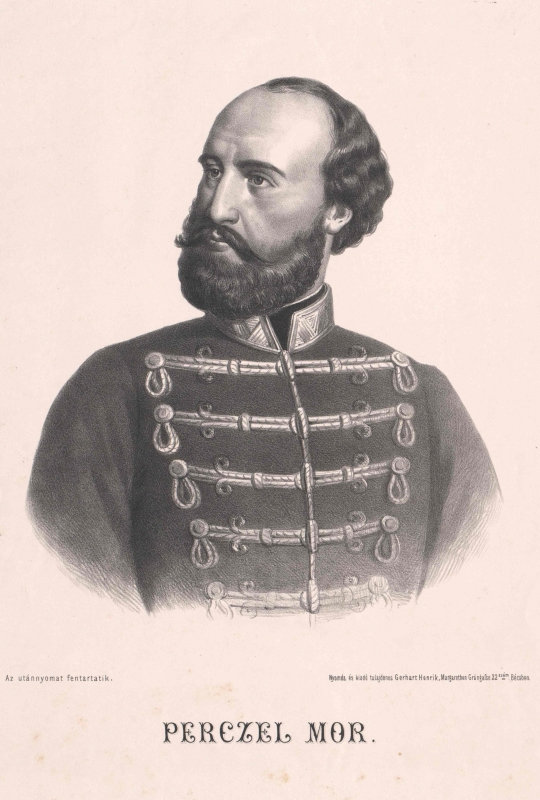
Perczel, Moritz (1811 - 1899)

Considering that in the case of continuing the offensive towards Debrecen, Pest and Buda could not be left without defense, but troops could only be left behind for this purpose at the expense of the army's further offensive operations, and also considering that the popular uprisings from Transdanubia were already endangering his communication with Vienna, Windisch-Grätz saw the continuation of offensive operations beyond the Tisza towards Debrecen as very dangerous, thus for the time being he contented himself with placing the capitals under the protection of his troops, under the leadership of General Heinrich Hentzi. Only Major General Ferenc Ottinger's brigade, consisting of two cavalry regiments of cuirassiers, a cavalry battery, and a Congreve rocket battery, was detached from Lieutenant General Josip Jelačić's corps and sent towards Szolnok on 8 January, when Perczel was already in Cegléd. The task of the brigade was the restoration of the railway and telegraph connection between Pest and Szolnok, the rebuilding of the Tisza bridge in Szolnok, and the surveillance of the Tisza line in general. Ottinger also had to take control of the large stockpiles from Szolnok. Ottinger left Pest on 9 January and arrived in Albertirsa the next day. Ottinger arrived in Cegléd on 11 January and entered Szolnok on the 13th. In Szolnok, Ottinger seized significant stocks of food and equipment. Here, Ottinger soon realized that his troops were too far away and isolated from the support of the Austrian main army. He realized that the position of Szolnok could be compared to a bag that the attacking side always has the possibility to tie up because the confluence of the Zagyva and the Tisza enables the troops attacking the defenders of the city to surround them. This was particularly true during winter when the cold temperatures of minus 15-20 degrees Celsius made it possible to cross the frozen rivers almost unnoticed by cavalry and artillery. However, Ottinger was one of the most skillful Austrian cavalry commanders. Sensing his isolated position, he constantly called for reinforcements, but despite the restored railway line, Windisch-Grätz did not send him infantry, which would have been better suited to defend Szolnok, than cavalry. Ottinger therefore made preparations to retreat in case of an overwhelming attack.

Windisch-Grätz, however, understood the danger late as usual. On 22 January, he asked Jelačić whether Ottinger's brigade should be withdrawn to Abony, but this was too late to reinforce Ottinger's troops sufficiently before the Hungarian attack. The Croatian Ban's last-minute reinforcements did not arrive in Szolnok before the battle on the 22nd.

== Prelude ==
Meanwhile, the National Defence Commission (OHB), which, starting from October 1848 was acting as a Hungarian government, was shocked to learn that Perczel had abandoned the Tisza line. Its president, Lajos Kossuth was not happy to see that the bridge over the Tisza at Szolnok was in the hands of the enemy, who had the opportunity to advance towards Debrecen or Szeged, to threaten the seat of government, or to lend a hand to the Serbs rebels from the southern front. On 15 January, both Perczel and Répásy received an order from the OHB demanding the two corps to stop the retreat and take offensive action. By a strange twist of fate, Szolnok was defended against Perczel on 22 January by the same Ottinger cavalry brigade that had so badly beaten him at Mór. Now the Hungarian general had the chance to avenge his earlier fiasco against Ottinger. On 18 January, Perczel reported to the OHB that he was leaving for Szolnok the next day. After leaving a few thousand men under the command of Lajos Asbóth to guard the bridge at Tiszafüred, it set off for Szolnok. In December 1848, Kossuth began to organize a reserve corps under the leadership of General Mihály Répásy, which had many untrained and unequipped units, but he put the more capable ones at Perczel's disposal. Répásy sent Perczel substantial reinforcements, which rose his troops to more than 16,000 men and 52 guns. On 16 January, Perczel's troops presented the following composition. At Karcag, 5 battalions, 8 companies of cavalry, 1 twelve, 1 six-pounder, and a 1/2 cavalry battery; at Nádudvar, 4 battalions and a six-pounder battery. In Tiszaújváros, 4 battalions, 6 cavalry companies, 1 six-pounder, and 1/2 cavalry battery; in all, 13 battalions, 14 companies of cavalry, and 40 cannons, about 15,000 men, and 2,000 horses. In its organization, the corps was divided into three divisions of 2-2 brigades under Mihály Répássy, János Hertelendy and István Szekulics. The two brigades of Hertelendy, were led by Majors Károly Mihály and Ignác Mándy; those of Szekulics by Majors Luigi Venturini and Alexander Buttler; and the two brigades of Répássy by Lieutenant Colonel Lajos Kazinczy and Major Károly Albrich. On the 21st, Perczel and the bulk of his army entered Törökszentmiklós, while Kazinczy's division was detached to Tiszabő.

=== Opposing forces ===
The Hungarian army

Corps	Troop	Brigade	Leader	Men	Horses	Cannons
Perczel's Corps; General Mór Perczel	Vanguard; Lieutenant Colonel Miklós Hertelendy	1. Brigade	Major Ignác Mándy	915	913	3
Perczel's Corps; General Mór Perczel	Vanguard; Lieutenant Colonel Miklós Hertelendy	2. Brigade	Major Károly Mihály	1,752	90	9
Perczel's Corps; General Mór Perczel	Vanguard; Lieutenant Colonel Miklós Hertelendy	Brigade total		2,667	1,003	12
Perczel's Corps; General Mór Perczel	Main troop Lieutenant Colonel István Szekulics	3. Brigade	Major Luigi Venturini	3,795	70	6
Perczel's Corps; General Mór Perczel	Main troop Lieutenant Colonel István Szekulics	4. Brigade	Major Alexander Buttler	3,925	90	8
Perczel's Corps; General Mór Perczel	Main troop Lieutenant Colonel István Szekulics	Brigade total		7,720	160	14
Perczel's Corps; General Mór Perczel	Rearguard; Major Miklós Perczel	5. Brigade	Major Miklós Perczel	2,802	390	8
Corps total				13,189	1,553	34
Troops from the Reserve Corps		I. Brigade	Lieutenant Colonel Lajos Kazinczy	1,750	400	14
Troops from the Reserve Corps		II. Brigade	Major Károly Albrich	2,900	648	18
Grand total				17,839	2,601	66

The Austrians:

Unit	Men	Horses	Cannons
6th (Wallmoden) Cuirassier Regiment	786	786	-
7th (Hardegg) Cuirassier Regiment	580	580	-
1st Cavalry Battery	120	140	6
17th Congreve Rocket Battery	100	100	6
Total	1,586	1,606	12

== Battle ==
Ottinger, having heard of the Hungarians' preparation of a raid against him, spent the night between January 20 and 21 with his whole brigade on horseback, ready to fight, and as the expected attack did not take place during the night, he sent a detachment in reconnaissance in the direction of Törökszentmiklós in the morning.

Perczel set 22 January as the date for his attack, on which day he himself intended to advance with the Hertelendy division against the bridge at Szolnok, while Kazinczy was to operate against the enemy's left flank, advancing from Tiszabő to Abony, and crossing the frozen Tisza and Zagyva, and the reserve under Lieutenant-Colonel Miklós Perczel was to operate against the enemy's right flank and rear, after crossing the Tisza below Szolnok.

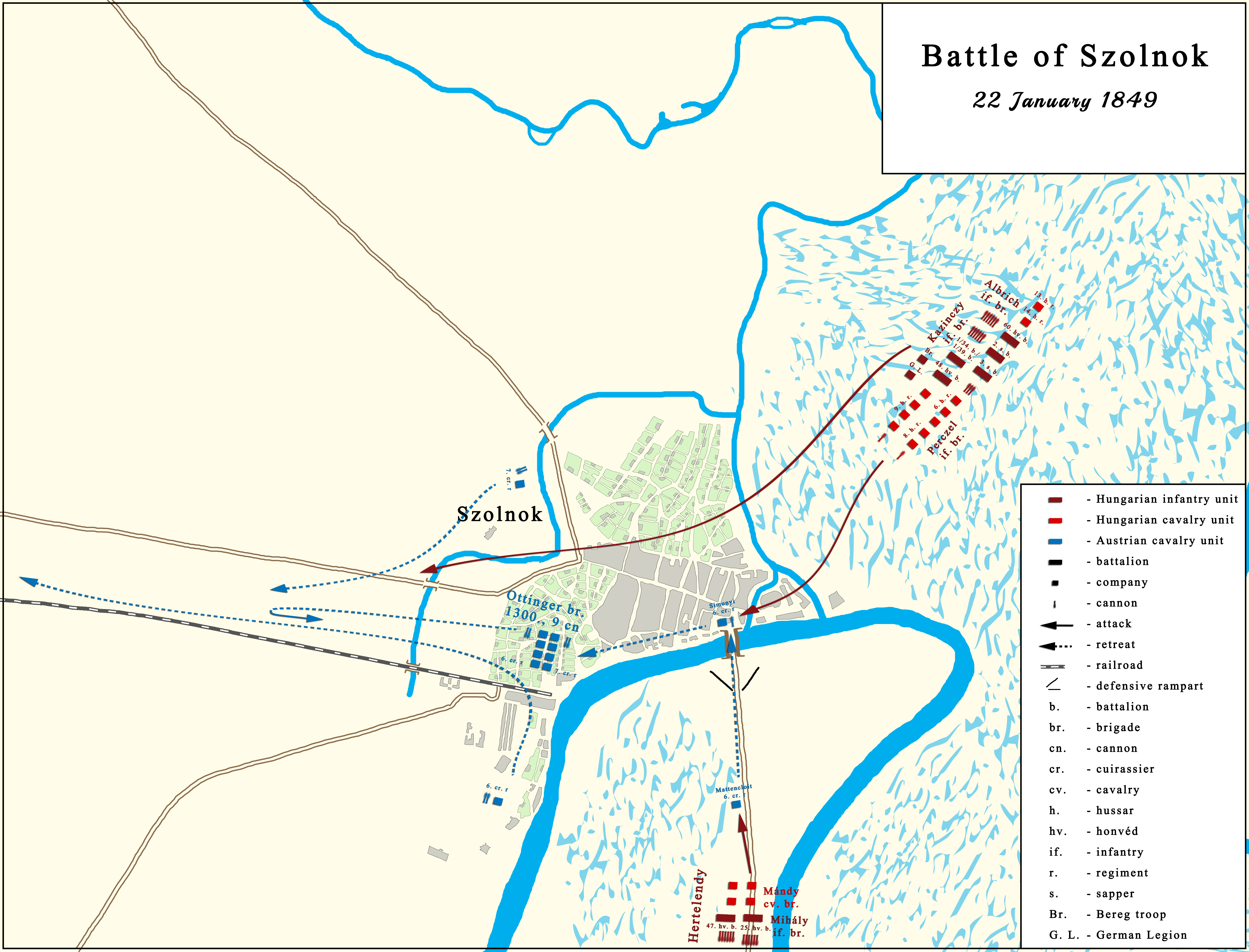
Battle of Szolnok of 22 January 1849

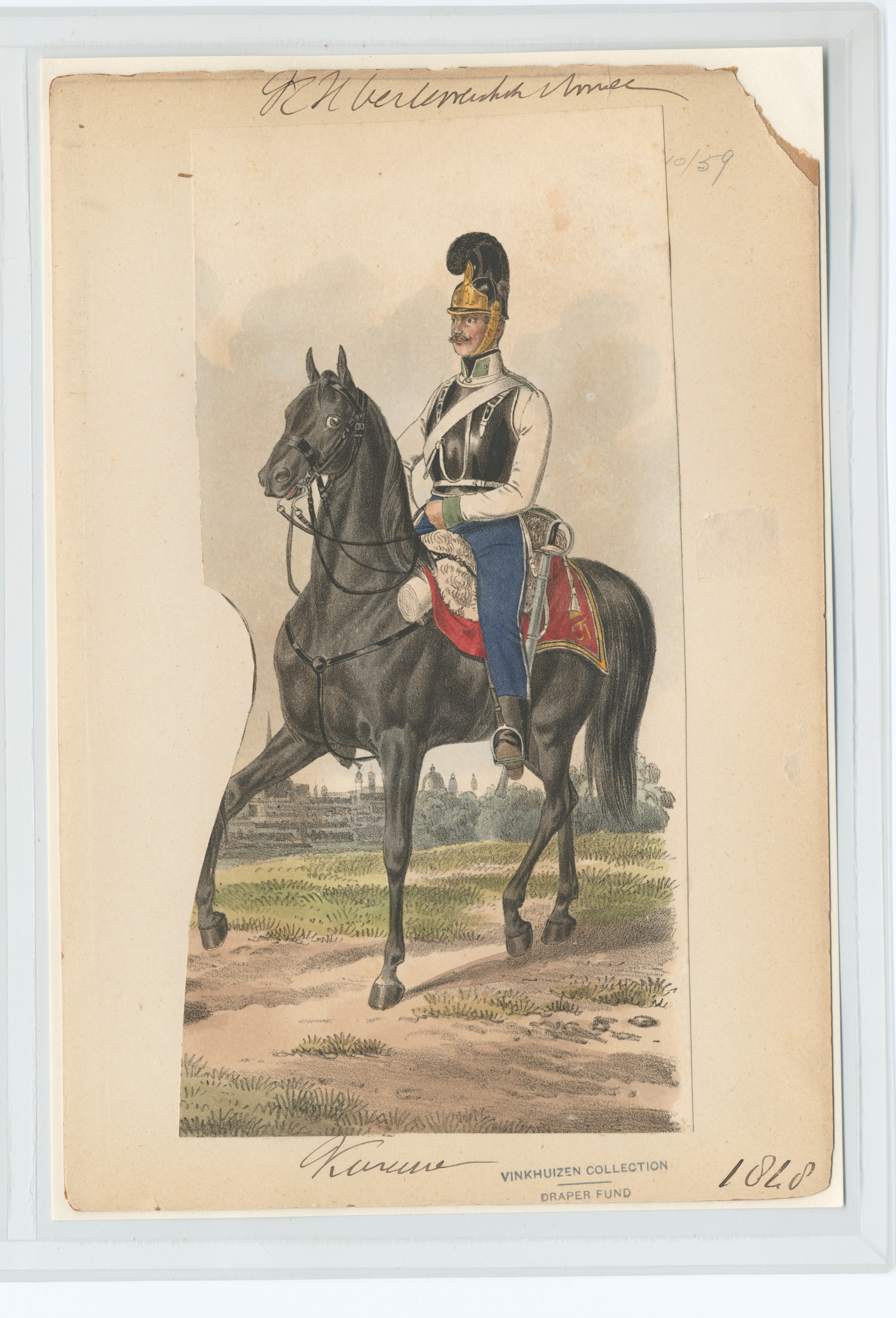
K.K. Austrian Cuirassier - 1848

Lieutenant Colonel Miklós Hertelendy's column of two brigades departed from Törökszentmiklós at 8 a.m. and arrived at Szolnok between 1 1/2 and 1 3/4 p.m. A part of the 6th (Württemberg) Hussar Regiment (probably a company) advanced to the Szanda tavern and chased away the Austrian cuirassier company which was there on reconnaissance, capturing two prisoners.

Meanwhile, in the terrible fog, the Hungarian soldiers who tried to encircle Ottinger's troops could barely see up to their noses and got lost, while the Austrian intelligence detachment noticed that strong enemy columns were advancing towards Szolnok. Being informed about this, Ottinger immediately ordered two guns to the bridge at Szolnok and alerted the brigade which he sent to rest shortly before.

Hertelendy's column attacked the Tisza bridge, but the garrison repulsed it for now. According to the diary of artillerist Károly László 7 Hussars advancing in front of the Hertelendy column attacked 17 cuirassiers at 500 paces distance from the town, and they almost disarmed them, when the Austrian cannons started to shoot grapeshot on them, which forced them to retreat, leaving a dead Hussar behind.

After this Hertelendy approached the bridge at a distance of a cannon shot and started to wait for Kazinczy's column to attack the Austrians on the Northern bank of the Tisza. After three signal shots, he sent the artillery (3 six-pounder cannons from the cavalry battery, and another 3 guns from the twelve-pounder battery) forward, in order to distract the enemy's attention from Kazinczy's troops, which he hoped to appear soon on the Austrian bridge-guards' back. After managing to drive the Austrians' attention to themselves, the Hungarian cannons retreated and responded from time to time to the enemy's shootings. But the Kazinczy column appeared much later than Hertelendy expected, only around 2,30 p.m. The infantry led by Miklós Perczel crossed the frozen Zagyva River, and two cavalry companies and the artillery crossed the bridge on the same river, entering Szolnok. At the same time Kazinczy with the 6 Hussar companies and some artillery tried to cut the retreat of the Austrians towards Abony. Some Hungarian memoirs accuse Kazinczy of making a too-wide detour, and due to this, he could not arrive on Ottinger's back in time.

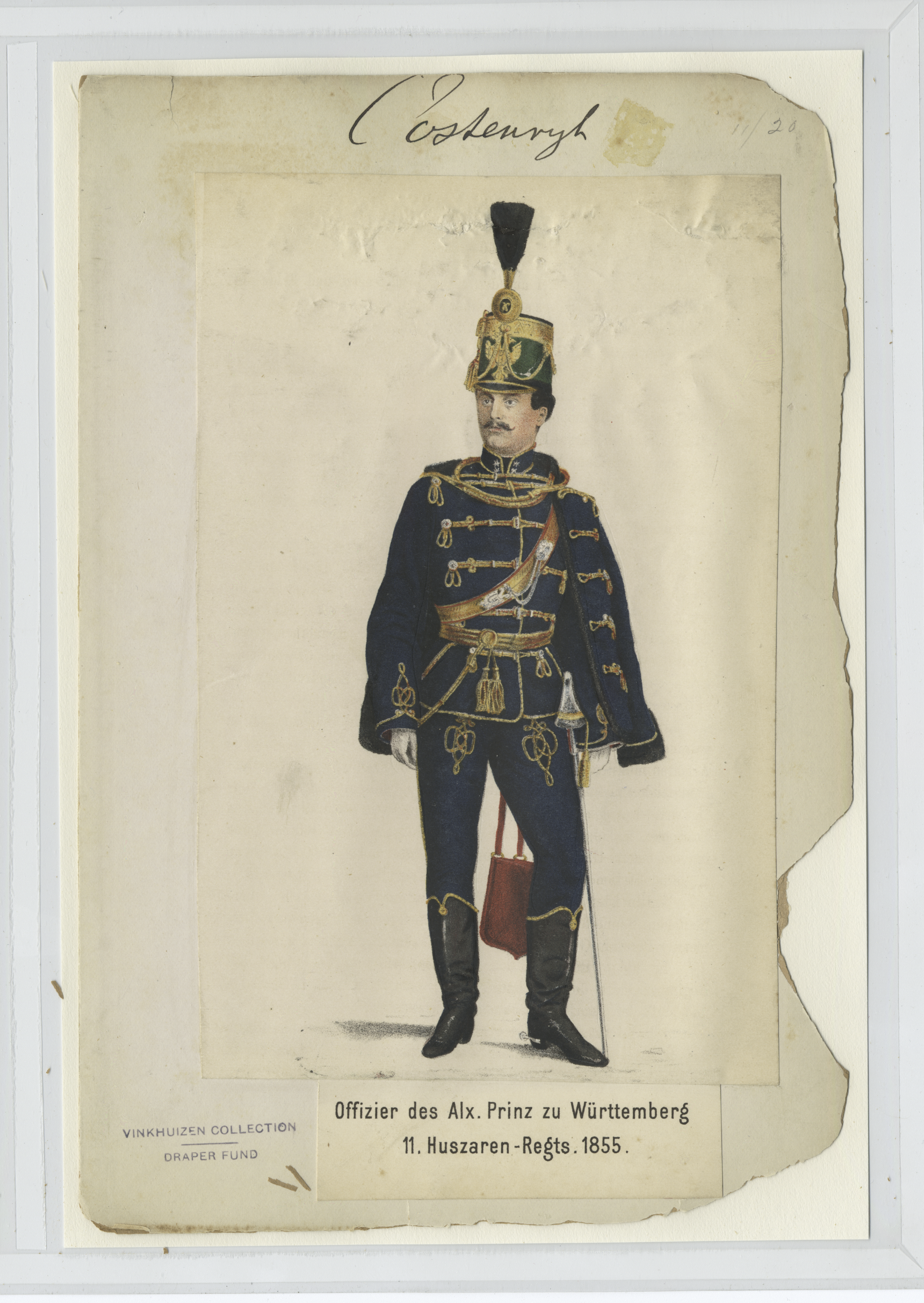
Württemberg Hussar Officer 1855

Meanwhile, Ottinger received a report that Hungarian troops were crossing the Tisza north of the city. According to Ottinger's report, the Austrian troops guarding the bridge were overwhelmed by a Hussar squadron, twice their number, after the Hungarians, crossing the frozen Tisza, entered the town from all directions. The Hungarian battle report however states that the Austrians guarded the bridge with two companies of cuirassiers (while the Austrians speak about one company) and two cannons, while the Hungarian troops that attacked them were a Hussar squadron (the same number as the Austrians) from Kazinczy's brigade.

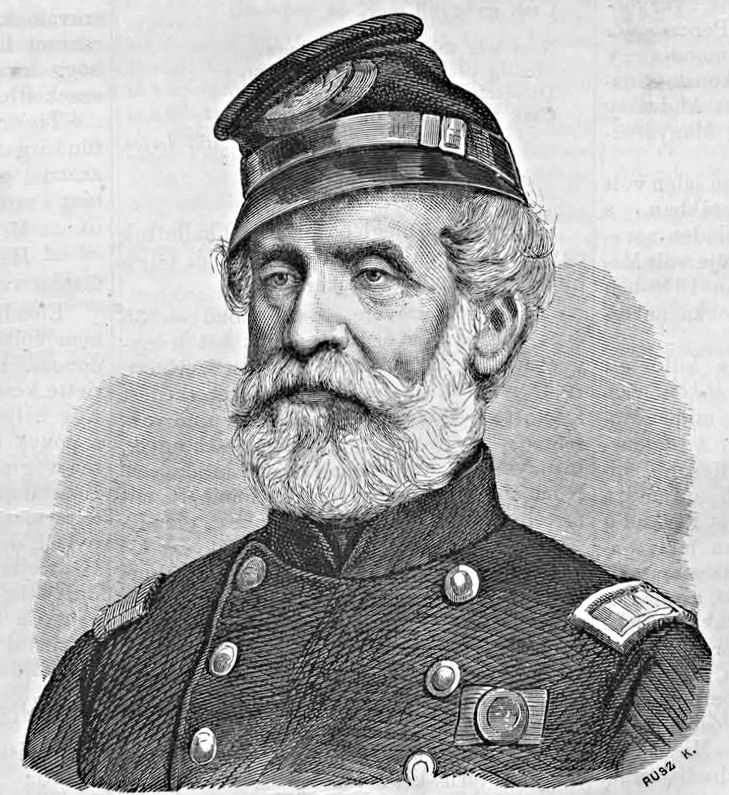
Miklós Perczel as an officer in the American Civil War

Ottinger realized that if he did not want to be trapped, he would have to withdraw. In the meantime Hertelendy's (or Kazinczy's) hussars took the bridge of the Tisza almost unopposed, and, driving in front of him the enemy cavalry units left in the town. According to a memoir, the Hungarian troops were also helped by the inhabitants of the town, who took out their hidden weapons and started to shoot the cuirassiers from the attics of their homes, while the others grabbed scythes and scoops, and chased the retreating Austrians. The two companies of Hussars which chased the retreating Austrians through the streets of the town when they arrived at its exit, confronted Ottinger's cavalry, placed here. Because of the thick fog, they did not notice the Major's squadron of the 7th (Hardegg) Cuirassiers deployed on the left flank of the Austrian troops, to pick up the retreating troops, and prevent the Hungarians from deploying on the fields outside Szolnok. The cuirassiers attacked from behind and side the Hussars, forcing them to retreat, leaving behind several deaths and one captain and 5 Hussars as prisoners. Perczel's report states that the cause of this was that, while the bulk of the hussars retreated, 17 of the boldly charged against the cuirassiers, and they suffered these losses.

This minor success helped the Austrians to start their retreat in order. But in the meanwhile, the cavalry and cavalry battery of the Hertelendy division crossed the town and appeared in front of Ottinger's troops. The guns were deployed on the western edge of Szolnok and began to fire effectively at the Ottiner brigade that tried to hold the line.

The Austrians tried to stop the attacking Hussars with grapeshot and Congreve rockets, but the for prevented him from doing much damage to them, while Kazinczy's artillery started to be more and more dangerous to the Austrians when they started to shoot in them from behind and the sides. According to Perczel's report, the artillery duel in front of Szolnok lasted 1 1/2 hours, and the retreating Austrians left many deaths on the battlefield. The Austrians withdrew towards Abony. Their retreat was covered by a half company of the Hardegg cuirassiers. Unfortunately, neither Kazinczy nor Lieutenant-Colonel Perczel's column appointed to encircle the Austrians from Szolnok could arrive in time because of the poor quality of the roads. Ottinger, not feeling safe even in Abony, retreated to Cegléd on the night of the 22nd, where Windisch-Grätz sent his 5th Kaiserjäger Battalion, 2 Border Guard Battalions and 3 batteries, partly by rail and partly on foot, at the first news of the battle of Szolnok.

== Aftermath ==
The defeat caused a serious disturbance at the K.u.K. Headquarters in Buda. On 23 January, Windisch-Grätz ordered Lieutenant-General Anton Csorich, who was pursuing Görgei, to return to the capital in a fast march with all his troops, except one brigade. On the same day, he ordered Lieutenant-General Schulzig, sent to the assistance of Lieutenant-General Franz Schlik, to detach a cavalry squadron to Poroszló, with the rumor that 10,000 men and 30 guns were coming there. This would create in the enemy from Szolnok the fear that their retreat to Debrecen via Poroszló and Tiszafüred was threatened, which he hoped that will make them to retreat on the left bank of the Tisza.

The retreating troops of Ferenc Ottinger arrived at Abony at 7 pm on 22 January, but the general, fearing that the Hungarians would attack at night, did not stop there either, but retreated with his troops to Cegléd, where he arrived at 12 am. Ottinger blamed his defeat mainly on the superiority of the Hungarian artillery. Perczel indeed had 52 cannons at his disposal, but he could not count on Szekulits's 14 cannons while from the remaining 38 cannons he could use 30 in the battle against the 12 Austrian cannons.

== Sources ==
- Bánlaky, József (2001). A magyar nemzet hadtörténelme ("The Military History of the Hungarian Nation) (in Hungarian). Budapest: Arcanum Adatbázis.
- Bóna, Gábor (1987). Tábornokok és törzstisztek a szabadságharcban 1848–49 ("Generals and Staff Officers in the War of Freedom 1848–1849") (in Hungarian). Budapest: Zrínyi Katonai Kiadó. p. 430. ISBN 963-326-343-3.
- Hermann, Róbert (2001), 1848-1849 a szabadságharc hadtörténete ("Military History of 1848-1849") (in Hungarian), Budapest: Korona, ISBN 963-9376-21-3
- Hermann, Róbert (2004). Az 1848–1849-es szabadságharc nagy csatái ("Great battles of the Hungarian Revolution of 1848-1849") (in Hungarian). Budapest: Zrínyi. p. 408. ISBN 963-327-367-6.
- Hermann, Róbert (2013). Nagy csaták. 15. A magyar önvédelmi háború ("Great Battles. 15. The Hungarian War od Self Defense") (in Hungarian). Budapest: Duna Könyvklub. p. 88. ISBN 978-615-5013-99-7.
- Horváth, Gábor (2021), "Január 22. – Az első szolnoki ütközet (1849) ("22 January - The First Battle of Szolnok")", győriszalon.hu 22.01.2022 (in Hungarian)
