= 10th Iowa Infantry Regiment =

- Active: September 6, 1861–August 15, 1865
- Disbanded: August 15, 1865
- Country: United States
- Allegiance: Union
- Branch: Infantry
- Size: Regiment (1,319 Total Enrollment)
- Engagements: American Civil War: Battle of Iuka; Battle of Corinth; Battle of Port Gibson; Battle of Raymond; Battle of Champion Hill; Battle of Big Black River Bridge; Siege of Vicksburg; Battle of Chattanooga; March to the Sea; Battle of Bentonville

Commanders
- Notable commanders: Col. Nicholas Perczel

The 10th Iowa Infantry Regiment was an infantry regiment that served in the Union Army during the American Civil War.

== Service ==
=== Organization and early service, 1861–1862 ===
The 10th Iowa Infantry was organized at Camp Fremont, near Iowa City, Iowa, in August and September 1861. Nine companies were mustered into federal service in September, with the remaining company completing its muster later that autumn. The regiment's first commander was Colonel Nicholas Perczel, a Hungarian-born immigrant and former military officer.

German-born immigrants were among the regiment's original volunteers in 1861. The official Iowa state roster identifies several German-born members, including Joseph Glosser and August Hemmenn of Company E. Glosser was killed in action at Chattanooga on November 25, 1863, while Hemmenn died of wounds received at the Second Battle of Corinth in October 1862.

After receiving equipment at St. Louis, Missouri, the regiment moved to Cape Girardeau, Missouri, where it helped construct fortifications and participated in operations against Confederate forces in southeastern Missouri. It subsequently served at Bird's Point, Missouri, where disease and winter conditions caused substantial losses.

In March 1862, the regiment participated in operations against New Madrid, Missouri, and Island No. 10. It subsequently joined the campaign against Corinth, Mississippi, participating in the siege and several reconnaissance operations.

On September 19, 1862, the regiment fought at the Battle of Iuka, where it helped protect the Union left flank. On October 3–4, it participated in the Second Battle of Corinth, helping resist Confederate attacks before joining the Union counterattack. The regiment suffered three killed and 36 wounded during the two-day battle.

=== Vicksburg and Chattanooga campaigns, 1863 ===
In early 1863, the 10th Iowa participated in the Yazoo Pass expedition before joining the Vicksburg campaign as part of the XVII Corps.

During May 1863, the regiment participated in operations at Port Gibson, Raymond, and Jackson. Its most costly engagement occurred at the Battle of Champion Hill on May 16. The regiment helped reinforce Union forces facing a Confederate attack and sustained 158 casualties, including 34 killed and 124 wounded.

The regiment subsequently joined the Siege of Vicksburg, participating in the unsuccessful Union assault of May 22. It remained on duty in the trenches, supporting artillery batteries and serving as sharpshooters, until late June. Following the surrender of Vicksburg on July 4, the regiment participated in operations against Confederate forces around Jackson, Mississippi.

In the autumn of 1863, the regiment moved with forces under Major General William Tecumseh Sherman to Chattanooga, Tennessee. At the Battle of Missionary Ridge on November 25, it fought near the Confederate position at Tunnel Hill, sustaining 11 killed, 35 wounded, and six captured out of approximately 250 engaged.

=== Veteran reorganization and Georgia operations, 1864 ===
Following winter service in northern Alabama, enough members of the regiment reenlisted in early 1864 to preserve its organization as a veteran infantry regiment.

During the spring, the regiment performed garrison and fortification duties at Decatur, Alabama. In June, reenlisted soldiers received furloughs to return to Iowa. The regiment returned to duty in northern Georgia in August, participating in railroad protection and expeditions against Confederate cavalry commanded by Major General Joseph Wheeler.

On September 28, 1864, the regiment's original three-year soldiers who had not reenlisted were mustered out of service. Approximately 150 new recruits joined the regiment in early October, replenishing its ranks shortly before Sherman's next campaign.

=== Sherman's March to the Sea, November–December 1864 ===
The 10th Iowa joined Sherman's March to the Sea as part of the Third Division of the XV Corps. Following the army's departure from Atlanta in November 1864, the regiment advanced through central Georgia toward Savannah, Georgia.

On December 10, the regiment reached Confederate defensive works near the Savannah and Ogeechee Canal. Confederate forces opened artillery fire from positions across a swamp, while Union soldiers constructed breastworks and established skirmish positions near the opposing lines.

On December 12, the regiment was ordered to guard the road leading toward Fort McAllister to prevent Confederate reinforcements from reaching the fort. The fort was captured the following day by another division of the XV Corps, opening communication between Sherman's army and the Union fleet.

After Confederate forces evacuated Savannah, the regiment entered the city on December 21 and established camp nearby, remaining there until January 9, 1865.

=== Carolinas Campaign and final service, 1865 ===
On January 9, 1865, the 10th Iowa departed Savannah and crossed into South Carolina, beginning its participation in the Carolinas campaign. Its advance was complicated by heavy rainfall, flooded roads, swamps, and repeated river crossings.

On February 5, the regiment participated in an engagement at the Little Salkehatchie River, where Union troops waded through swamps and streams to attack Confederate positions protected by earthworks. The regiment reported two men slightly wounded.

The regiment continued toward Columbia, South Carolina, entering the city with other Union forces on February 17. It then marched northward through the Carolinas, reaching Fayetteville, North Carolina, on March 12.

On March 19–20, the regiment skirmished with Confederate forces near Cox's Bridge on the Neuse River. It participated in the destruction of the bridge while under Confederate artillery fire, suffering one killed and four wounded.

The XV Corps entered Goldsboro, North Carolina, on March 22, where the regiment went into camp following the lengthy campaign.

The regiment resumed its march on April 7 and subsequently reached Raleigh, North Carolina, during the final operations against Confederate forces commanded by General Joseph E. Johnston. Following Johnston's surrender, the regiment marched northward to Washington, D.C.

On May 24, 1865, the 10th Iowa participated in the Grand Review of the Armies in Washington. Following the review, the regiment moved to Louisville, Kentucky, and subsequently to Little Rock, Arkansas, where it was mustered out of federal service on August 15, 1865.

== Total strength and casualties ==
Total enrollment was 1319. The regiment lost 6 officers and 95 enlisted men who were killed in action or who died of their wounds and 134 enlisted men who died of disease, for a total of 235 fatalities. 277 were wounded.

== Commanders ==
- Colonel Nicholas Perczel
- Colonel William E. Small

== See also ==
- List of Iowa Civil War units
- Iowa in the American Civil War

== Bibliography ==
- Baker, Nathaniel B. (1863). The Report of The Adjutant General and Acting Quartermaster General of Iowa. Volume 1. F.W. Palmer. State Printer. Des Moines, Iowa.
