= Mór Perczel =

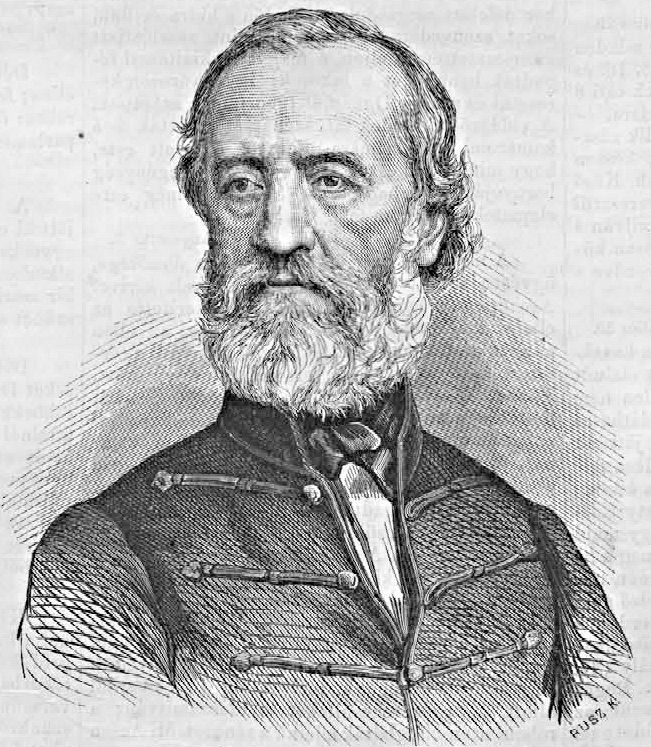
- An engraving by Károly Rusz in the Vasárnapi Újság ("Sunday News") of 25 August 1867
- Born: 11 November 1811; Bonyhád, Tolna county
- Died: 23 May 1899 (aged 87); Bonyhád
- Burial place: Bonyhád; 46.295969°N 18.540555°E
- Military career
- Allegiance: Revolutionary Hungarian Army
- Rank: General
- Commands: 4th Bácska Legion, army reserves
- Battles: Battle of Pákozd (1848); Battle of Mór (1848); Battle of Szőreg (1849); Battle of Temesvár (1849); Battle of Hegyes (1849)
- Other work: Politician, Delegate, Memoirist

Sir Mór Perczel de Bonyhád (Hungarian: Bonyhádi lovag Perczel Mór, German: Ritter Moritz Perczel von Bonyhád; 11 November 1811, Bonyhád, Tolna county – 23 May 1899, Bonyhád), was a Hungarian landholder, general, and one of the leaders of the Hungarian Revolution of 1848.

== Life before 1848 ==
His teacher Mihály Vörösmarty influenced Perczel to become a democrat and patriot. In April 1827 he enrolled in the 5th Infantry Regiment as a student. In 1831 during the Polish November Uprising he started a rebellion in the Imperial Infantry. He tried to convince them to desert to the Polish soldiers, but they removed him.

His political career started in Tolna shire county before moving to shire and rural politics.

In the diet of 1843–44 he became a minister, and one of the most popular mavericks. His speeches garnered him attention. Later on he joined the Radical Party.

In Fejér county on 22 October 1842 he proposed setting up the Hungarian National Guard. In 1848 he became the representative for Buda and one of the leaders of the Left.

== During the revolution ==
From 1848 Perczel was the Councillor of the Ministry of Home Affairs in the Batthyány Government. On 1 September 1848 he formed the Zrínyi army and with his leadership they fought against Josip Jelačić. The members of the army were mostly volunteers. In the Battle of Pákozd he covered the wing of the Hungarian army south of Lake Velence. After the battle he led the movements against Jelačić's army reserves. The armies of Generals Roth and the Philippovic capitulated because of Perczel and Artúr Görgey. For this victory Perczel was promoted to General. After the victory he fell out with Görgey and the conflict between them made the leadership problematic.

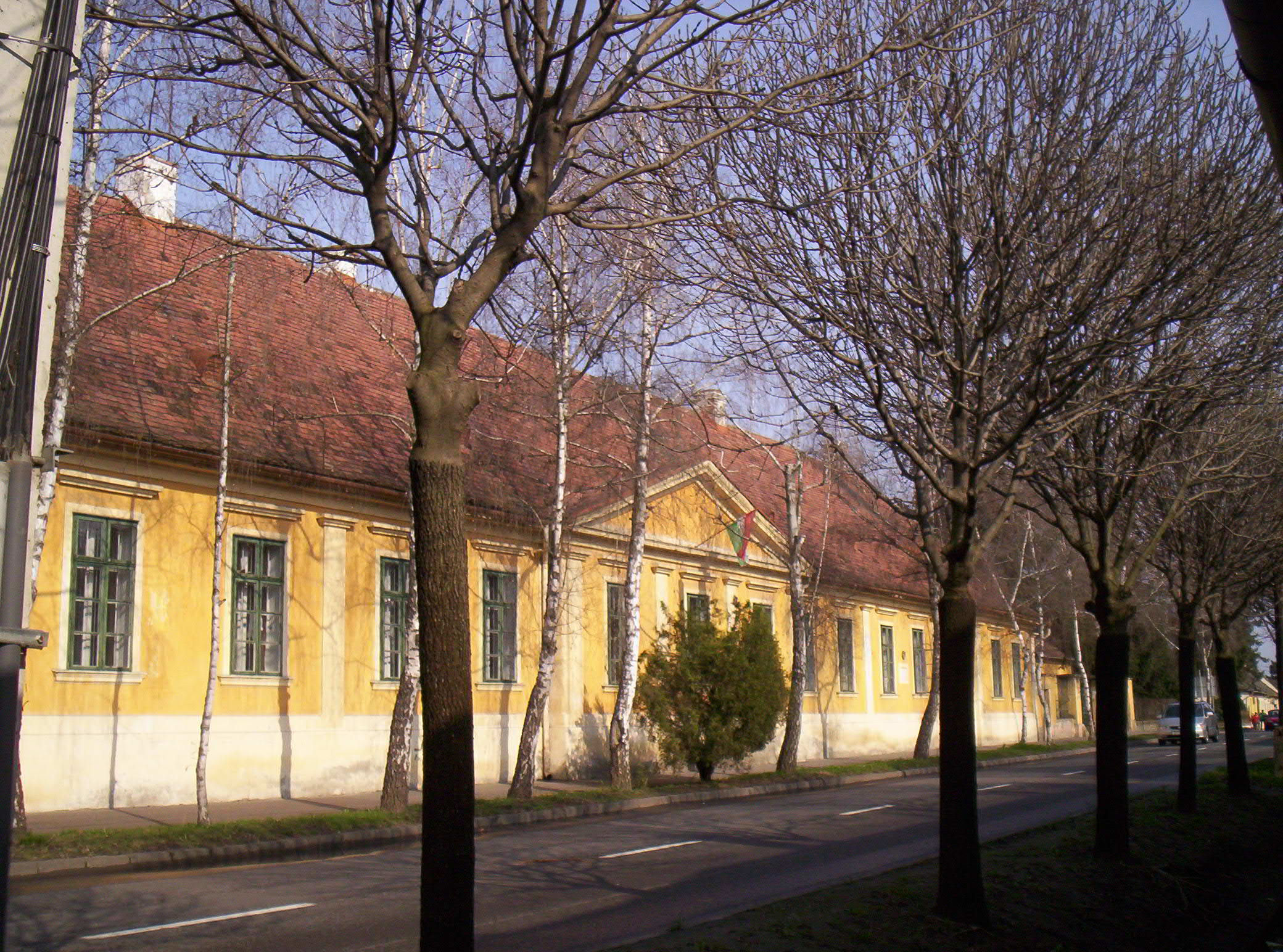
Perczel's birthplace in Bonyhád

After the victory at Ozora he managed to cut out the Emperor's army in Međimurje County. Before the attack by Alfred I, Prince of Windisch-Grätz in December Perczel had to defend Southwest Transdanubia, but in the middle of December — because of the success of the Emperor's army — he received an order to move to the Upper Danube and join forces with Görgey. During the army's withdrawal he received a letter from Lajos Kossuth and decided to fight against the Emperor. On 30 December 1848 he lost the battle against Jelačić in the Battle of Mór. Arrest warrants were issued by the Austrian government for Kossuth, Perczel and General Josef Bem. General Bem was another general for the new Hungarian Republic who was having great success clearing the invading Russian forces from Transylvania.

After giving up Pest his responsibility was attacking the route from Pest to Debrecen on the Tisza front. With his strong army, he started to attack and on 22 January 1849 occupied Szolnok. On 25 January he wiped out Ferenc Ottinger and his army from Cegléd. But the leadership stopped Perczel's attacks and the new commander took away one of Perczel's divisions, so Perczel resigned.

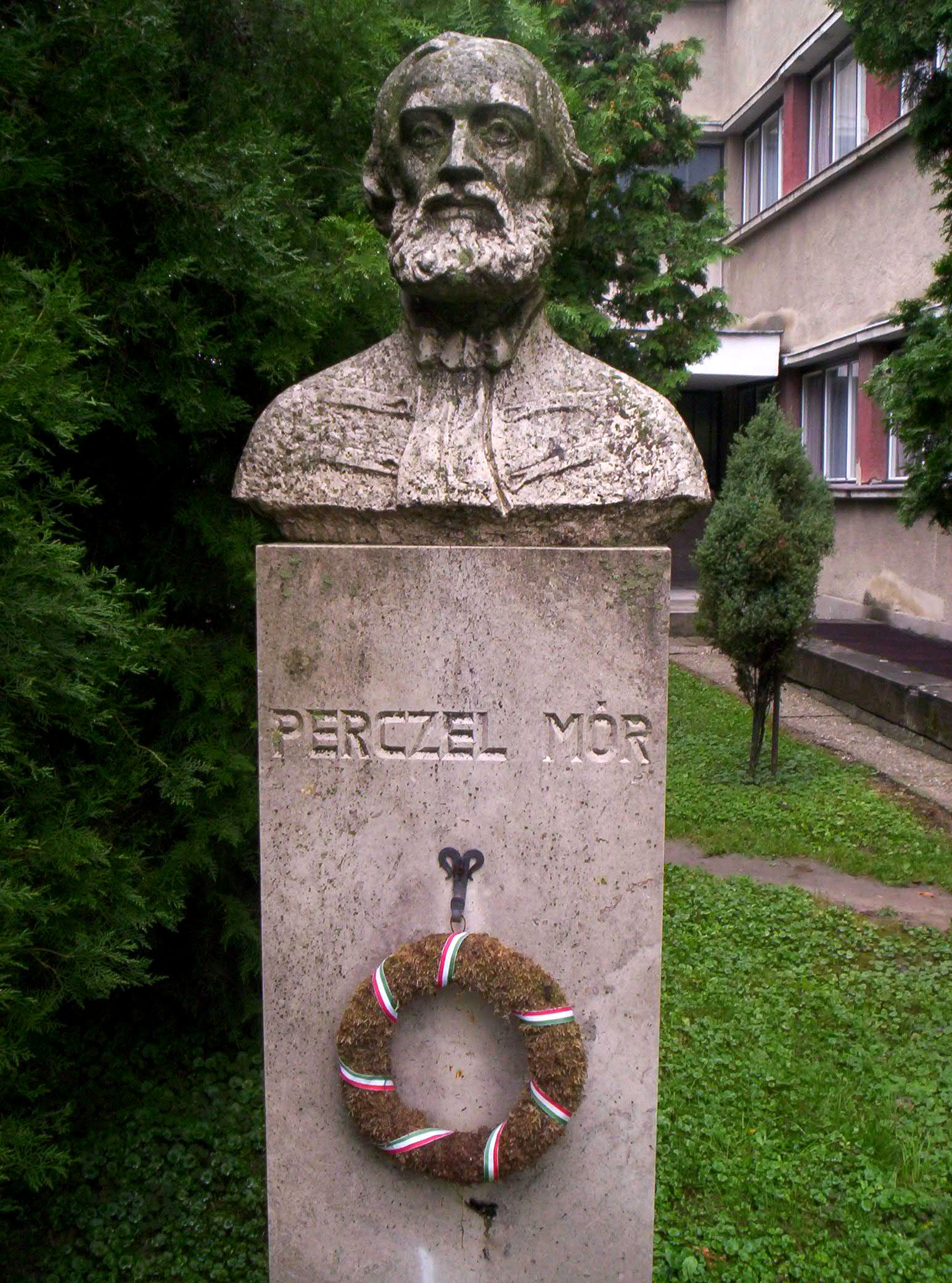
Bust in Bonyhád

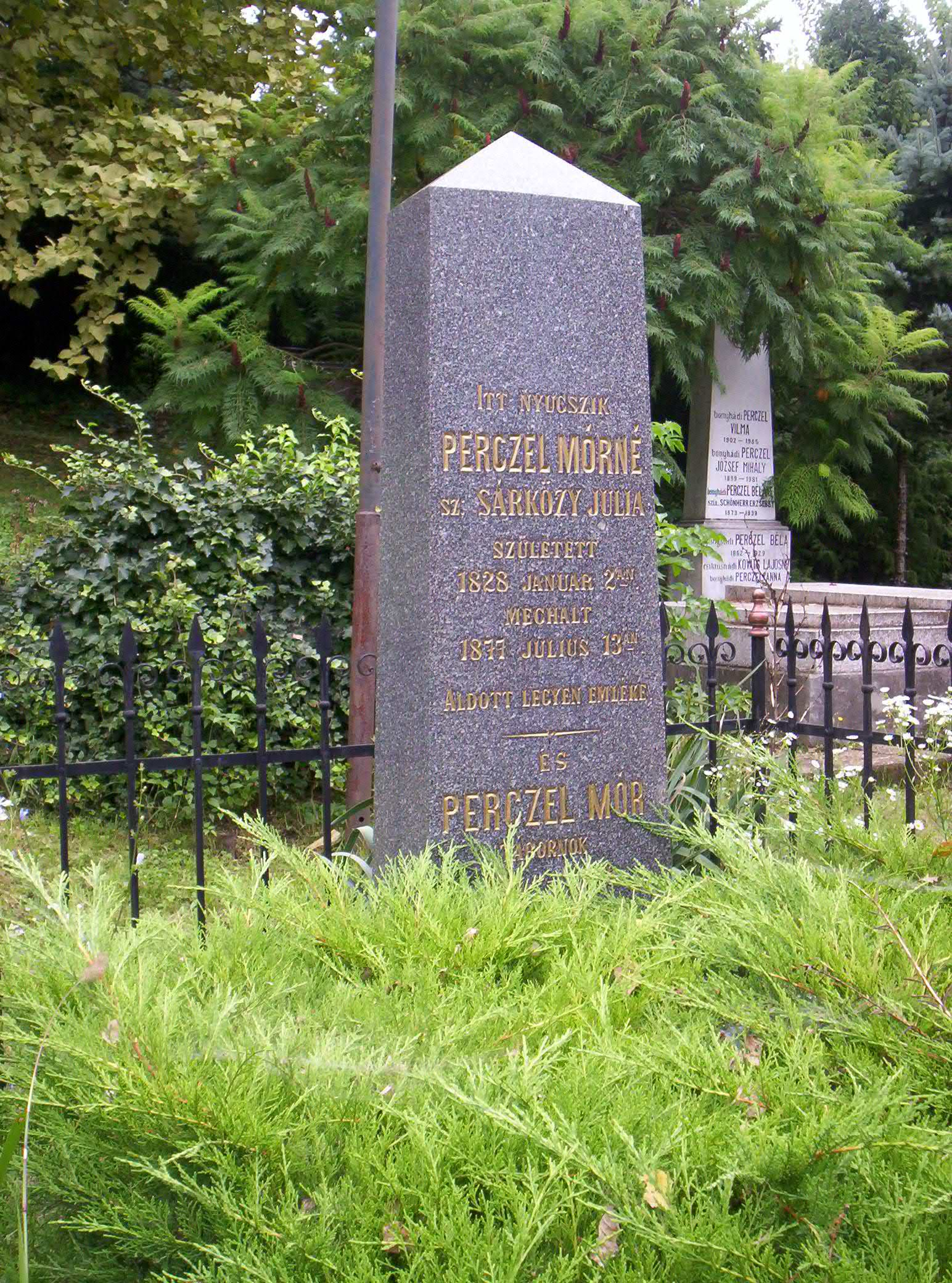
Grave in Bonyhád

At the beginning of 1849 Perczel took command of the 4th (Bačka) Legion and on 23 March he attacked the Serbs. On 3 April he occupied Szenttamás in Vojvodina. Then he marched with his army to Novi Sad which is directly opposite Petrovaradin on the Danube River. Then Perczel made contact with the Hungarians besieged in Petrovaradin fortress and established his center of operations there. Together with Count Lajos Batthyany, former Prime Minister of the new Hungarian Republic, but since 15 September 1848 a general in the Hungarian Army, Perczel move the main body Hungary military forces against Danube and the Drava Rivers to threaten Slavonia and to restrict Austrian navigation between Pest and Mohács. This action effectly cut off the Austrians on the western front from contact with Laval Nugent and Serbian forces in the southern front. The maneuver had the additional effect of sending the Austrians on the western front retreating back toward Zagreb in southwestern Hungary and Osijek. Marching back across the Banat toward the Theiss River, Perczel's army was stopped pushed into retreat by Serbian forces under Đorđe Stratimirović, and Kusman von Todorovich. On 29 April at Melenci he won a battle against Tudorovic and on 10 May he marched on Pančevo. Later, with the contribution of General József Bem, he occupied Temesköz. This brought the southern operations to a successful close.

On 7 June 1849 Perczel fought against Jelačić, but he lost this battle at Kać. Because of the defeat the government relieved him and gave an order to set up and lead the reserve army. In the middle of July another army joined Perczel's near Cegléd with Perczel as commander of the two, but he did not want to fight larger battles.

When the government and the leading generals met, Perczel criticised the leadership, especially Lajos Kossuth. They forced him to resign his commission. Perczel fought as a volunteer in the Battle of Szőreg on 5 August 1849 and Battle of Temesvár on 9 August 1849. He was in Orsova when he heard news of the final surrender at Világos (now Şiria, Romania).

== Banishment ==
On 21 September 1851 Perczel and his brother Miklós (Michael) were sentenced to death. Perczel escaped to Turkey and in 1852 to England. He lived for a while on the Channel Island of Jersey. In 1859 Perczel tried to forget his arguments with Lajos Kossuth and traveled to Italy to help the Hungarian Nationals Trust, an organisation set up to help Hungarian emigrants.

== Back home ==
In 1867 Perczel was allowed to return to Hungary and went back to Bonyhád, his birthplace. He was an advocate of the Austro-Hungarian Compromise of 1867, but only because Kossuth was against it. After a short time as a delegate he retired and wrote his memoirs.

== See also ==
- Perczel

== Sources ==
- Marx, Karl; Engels, Friedrich (1978). Karl Marx, Frederick Engels: Collected Works, Volume 9. International Publishers. ISBN 9780717805099.
