= Miklós Perczel =

Hungarian landholder, officer and one of the leaders of the Hungarian Revolution of 1848

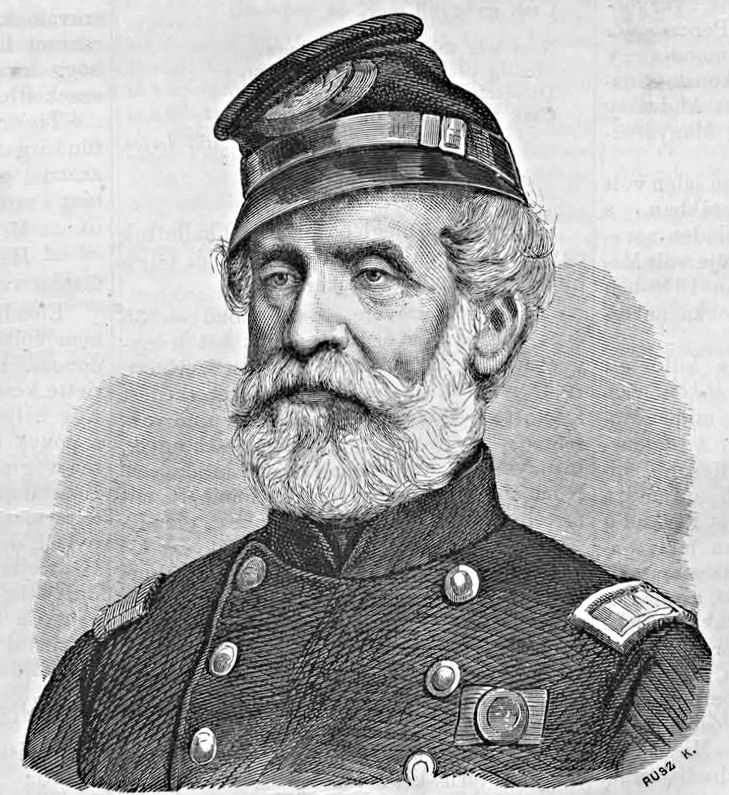
- An engraving by Károly Rusz in the Vasárnapi Újság ("Sunday News") of 13 October 1867
- Born: December 15, 1812; Bonyhád, Kingdom of Hungary
- Died: March 14, 1904 (aged 91); Baja, Kingdom of Hungary
- Other name: Nicholas Perczel
- Military career
- Allegiance: Revolutionary Hungarian Army; Union Army
- Rank: Colonel
- Commands: 10th Iowa Infantry Regiment; 2nd Brigade, 2nd Division, Army of the Mississippi
- Battles: Hungarian Revolution of 1848: Battle of Pákozd; Battle of Mór; Battle of Temesvár
- Other work: Politician

Sir Miklós Perczel de Bonyhád (15 December 1812 in Bonyhád, Hungary – 14 March 1904 in Baja, Hungary), also known as Nicholas Perczel, was a Hungarian landholder, officer, and one of the leaders of the Hungarian Revolution of 1848. After his emigration to the United States of America he participated in the American Civil War as colonel of the 10th Iowa Infantry Regiment in the Union Army. He had a significant role in the liberation of Missouri. His older brother was Mór Perczel.
