= Hungarian Revolution of 1848 =

Failed Hungarian revolt against the Austrian and Russian Empires

- Part of the Revolutions of 1848
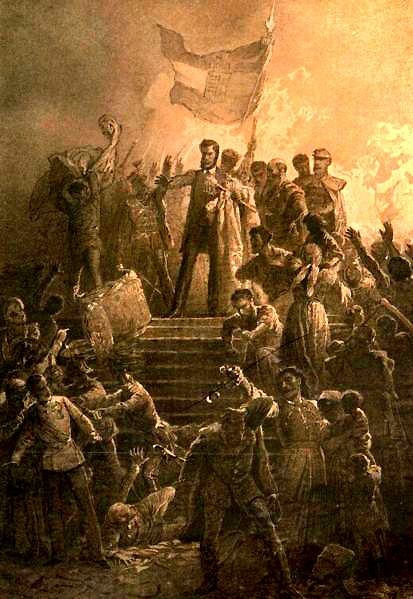
- Artist Mihály Zichy's painting of Sándor Petőfi reciting the National Song to a crowd on 15 March 1848
Date	15 March 1848 – 4 October 1849 (1 year, 6 months, 2 weeks, and 5 days)
Location	Kingdom of Hungary, Austrian Empire
Result	Austro-Russian victory

Belligerents
Austrian Empire; Kingdom of Croatia; Serbian Vojvodina; Serbian volunteers; Pro-Habsburg Hungarians; Slovak National Council; Transylvanian Romanians; Transylvanian Saxons; Supreme Ruthenian Council; Czech and Moravian volunteers; Russian Empire; Grand Duchy of Finland	Kingdom of Hungary; Hungarian State (14 April – 13 August 1849); Legions of the revolutionaries from German states; Polish legions; Italian legions; Székelys; Hungarian Jews; Hungarian Germans; Hungarian Slovenes; Pro-Hungarian Slovaks; Pro-Hungarian Romanians; Pro-Hungarian Serbs; Pro-Hungarian Rusyns; Zipser Saxons; Croats from Western Hungary and Muraköz; Šokac and Bunjevac people; Banat Bulgarians

Commanders and leaders
(Austrian Empire) Franz Joseph I (after 2 December 1848); (Austrian Empire) Ferdinand I (before 2 December 1848); (Austrian Empire) Alfred I of Windisch-Grätz; (Austrian Empire) Ludwig von Welden; (Austrian Empire) Julius Jacob von Haynau; (Austrian Empire) Franz Schlik; (Austrian Empire) Karl von Urban; (Austrian Empire) Josip Jelačić; (Austrian Empire) Stevan Knićanin; (Austrian Empire) Ľudovít Štúr; (Austrian Empire) Avram Iancu; (Austrian Empire) Hryhory Yakhymovych; (Russian Empire) Nicholas I; (Russian Empire) Ivan Paskevich	(Kingdom of Hungary (1526–1867)) Lajos Kossuth; (Kingdom of Hungary (1526–1867)) Lajos Batthyány (executed); (Kingdom of Hungary (1526–1867)) Artúr Görgey (POW); (Kingdom of Hungary (1526–1867)) György Klapka; (Kingdom of Hungary (1526–1867)) János Damjanich (executed); (Kingdom of Hungary (1526–1867)) Lajos Aulich (executed); Henryk Dembiński; Józef Bem; Józef Wysocki

Strength
170,000 men from the Austrian Empire, and 200,000 men from the Russian Empire	Beginning of 1849: 170,000 men

Casualties and losses
(Austrian Empire) 16,600 killed or wounded 14,200 prisoners 41,000 dead of disease (Russian Empire) 903 killed 1,585 wounded 13,554 dead of disease Total casualties: 87,842	45,000 dead from all causes

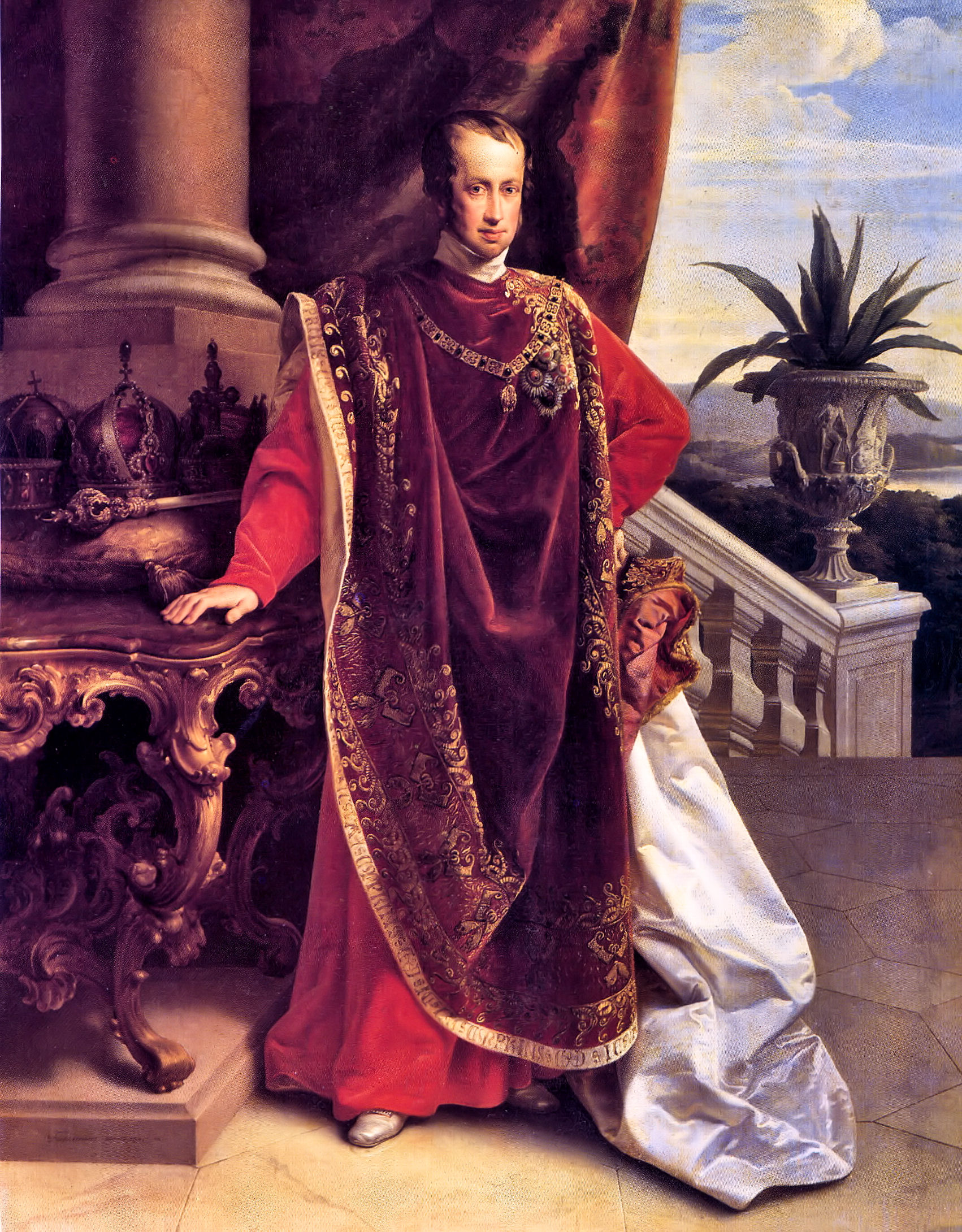
State portrait of Emperor Ferdinand I in the ceremonial robes of the Order of the Golden Fleece (by Leopold Kupelwieser, c. 1847)

The Hungarian Revolution of 1848, also known in Hungary as Hungarian Revolution and War of Independence of 1848–1849 (Hungarian: 1848–49-es forradalom és szabadságharc) was one of a number of European Revolutions of 1848 and was closely linked to other revolutions of 1848 in the Habsburg areas. Although the Hungarian War of Independence failed, it is one of the most significant events in Hungary's modern history, forming the cornerstone of modern Hungarian national identity—the anniversary of the Revolution's outbreak, 15 March, is one of Hungary's three national holidays.

In April 1848, Hungary became the third country of continental Europe (after France, in 1791, and Belgium, in 1831) to enact a law implementing democratic parliamentary elections. The new suffrage law (Act V of 1848) transformed the old feudal parliament (Estates General) into a democratic representative parliament. This law offered the widest right to vote in Europe at the time. The April laws utterly erased all privileges of the Hungarian nobility.

The crucial turning point came when the new Austrian monarch Franz Joseph I arbitrarily revoked the April laws without any legal right (since they had already been ratified by King Ferdinand I). This unconstitutional act irreversibly escalated the conflict between him and the Hungarian parliament. The new constrained Stadion Constitution of Austria, the revocation of the April laws, and the Austrian military campaign against the Kingdom of Hungary resulted in the fall of the pacifist Batthyány government (who sought agreement with the court) and led to Lajos Kossuth's followers (who demanded full independence for Hungary) suddenly gaining power in the parliament. Austrian military intervention in the Kingdom of Hungary resulted in strong anti-Habsburg sentiment among Hungarians, and the events in Hungary grew into a war for total independence from the Habsburg dynasty. Around 40% of the private soldiers in the Hungarian Revolutionary Volunteer Army consisted of ethnic minorities of the country. Regarding the officer staff of Hungary: Around half of the officers and generals of the Hungarian Honvéd Army had foreign origin. There were at least as many ethnic Hungarian professional officers in the Imperial Habsburg army as in the Hungarian revolutionary Honvéd army.

In regard to diplomacy and foreign policy during the revolution, the Hungarian liberals - similar to the other European liberal revolutionaries of 1848 – were primarily motivated by ideological considerations. They supported countries and forces that aligned with their new moral and political standards. They also believed that governments and political movements sharing the same modern liberal values should form an alliance against the "feudal type" of monarchies. This outlook was similar to modern liberal internationalism.

After a series of serious Austrian defeats in 1849, the Austrian Empire came close to the brink of collapse. The new emperor Franz Joseph I had to call for Russian help in the name of the Holy Alliance. In the hope of Russian military support, the young Emperor Franz Joseph kissed the hands of the Ruler of all the Russians in Warsaw on 21 May 1849. Nicholas I of Russia agreed with Franz Joseph and sent a 200,000 strong army with 80,000 auxiliary forces. The joint Russo-Austrian army finally defeated the Hungarian forces, Habsburg power was restored and Hungary was placed under martial law.

== Hungary before the Revolution ==
Unlike other Habsburg-ruled areas, the Kingdom of Hungary had an old historic constitution, which limited the power of the Crown and had greatly increased the authority of the parliament since the 13th century. The Golden Bull of 1222 was one of the earliest examples of constitutional limits being placed on the powers of a European monarch, which was forced on the Hungarian king in much the same way King John of England was made to sign Magna Carta. In 1804, Emperor Franz assumed the title of Emperor of Austria for all the Erblande of the dynasty and for the other Lands, however the new Erblande term was not applied to Kingdom of Hungary The Court reassured Hungary's separate parliament, the Diet of Hungary, however, that the assumption of the monarch's new title did not in any sense affect Hungary's separate legal system and constitution.

The other serious problem for the Habsburgs was the traditionally highly autonomous counties of Hungary, which proved to be a solid and major obstacle in the construction of Habsburg absolutism in Hungary. The counties were the centers of local public administration and local politics in Hungary, and they possessed a recognized right to refuse to carry out any "unlawful" (unconstitutional) royal orders. Thus, it was possible to question the legality of a surprisingly high proportion of the royal orders which emanated from Vienna.

Until 1848, the Kingdom of Hungary's administration and government remained largely untouched by the government structure of the "overarching" Austrian Empire. However the old Hungarian constitution and Hungarian public law made it legally impossible to merge the Kingdom of Hungary into a different state. Hungary's central government structures remained well separated from the imperial government. The country was governed by the Council of Lieutenancy of Hungary (the Gubernium) – based in Pozsony (now Bratislava) and later in Pest – and by the Hungarian Royal Court Chancellery in Vienna.

While in most Western European countries (like France and Britain) the king's reign began immediately upon the death of his predecessor, in Hungary the coronation was absolutely indispensable as, if it were not properly executed, the Kingdom stayed "orphaned". Even during the long personal union between the Kingdom of Hungary and other Habsburg ruled areas, the Habsburg monarchs had to be crowned as King of Hungary in order to promulgate laws there or exercise royal prerogatives in the territory of the Kingdom of Hungary. Since the Golden Bull of 1222, all Hungarian monarchs were obliged to take an oath during the coronation ceremony to uphold the constitutional arrangement of the country, to preserve the liberties of its subjects and to respect the territorial integrity of the realm. From 1526 to 1851, the Kingdom of Hungary also maintained its own customs borders, which separated Hungary from the united customs system of other Habsburg ruled territories.

=== The Hungarian Jacobin Club ===
In February 1790 the Holy Roman Emperor, Joseph II died and was succeeded by Francis I, putting a stop to enlightened reforms in Hungary, which outraged reform-oriented French-speaking intellectuals who were followers of new radical ideas based on French Enlightenment philosophy. Ignác Martinovics, who worked as a secret agent for the new Holy Roman Emperor, Leopold II, until 1792 in his Oratio pro Leopoldo II explicitly declared that only authority derived from a social contract should be recognized; he saw the aristocracy as the enemy of mankind, because they prevented ordinary people from becoming educated. In another of his works, Catechism of People and Citizens, he argued that citizens tend to oppose any repression and that sovereignty resides with the people. He also became a Freemason, and was in favour of the adoption of a federal republic in Hungary. As a member of the Hungarian Jacobins, he was considered an idealistic forerunner of revolutionary thought by some, and an unscrupulous adventurer by others. He stirred up a revolt against the nobility among the Hungarian serfs, a subversive act which led Francis II, the Holy Roman Emperor, to dismiss Martinovics and his boss, Ferenc Gotthardi, the former chief of the secret police. He was executed, together with six other prominent Jacobins, in May 1795. More than 42 members of the republican secret society were arrested, including the poet János Batsányi and linguist Ferenc Kazinczy.

Though the Hungarian Jacobin republican movement did not affect the policy of the Hungarian Parliament and the parliamentary parties, it had strong ideological ties with forces beyond the parliament: radical youths and students like the poet Sándor Petőfi, the novel-writer Mór Jókai, the philosopher and historian Pál Vasvári, and the journalist József Irinyi who sparked the revolution in the Pilvax coffee palace on 15 March 1848.

=== Era of Reforms ===
The frequent diets held in the earlier part of the reign occupied themselves with little else but war subsidies; after 1811 the Holy Roman Emperor stopped summoning them. In the latter years of Francis I's rule the dark shadow of Metternich's policy of "stability" fell across Hungary, and the forces of reactionary absolutism reigned supreme. However, beneath the surface a strong popular current was beginning to run in the opposite direction. Affected by western Liberalism but without any direct help from abroad, Hungarian society was preparing for its future emancipation. Writers, scholars, poets, artists, noble and ordinary people, lay people and priests, without any previous history of working together or obvious connections between them, were working towards that ideal of political liberty which was to unite all Hungarians. Consciously or unconsciously, Mihály Vörösmarty, Ferenc Kölcsey, Ferencz Kazinczy and his associates, to name but a few, were giving new life to Hungarian literature and simultaneously accomplishing political goals, with their pens proving no less powerful than their ancestors' swords.

In 1825 Emperor Francis II finally convened the Diet in response to growing concerns amongst the Hungarian nobility about taxes and the diminishing economy, after the Napoleonic Wars. This – and the reaction to the reforms of Joseph II – started what is known as the Reform Period (Hungarian: reformkor). Even so, the Nobles still retained their privileges of paying no taxes and not giving the vote to the masses. The influential Hungarian politician Count István Széchenyi recognized the need to bring the country the advances of the more developed West European countries, such as Britain.

It was a direct attack upon the constitution which, in István Széchenyi's words, first "startled the nation out of its sickly drowsiness". In 1823, when the reactionary powers were considering joint action to suppress the revolution in Spain, the government imposed a war-tax and conscription without consulting the diet. The county assemblies instantly protested against this illegal act and at the 1823 diet Francis I was obliged to repudiate his ministers' actions. However, the estates felt that the maintenance of their liberties demanded more substantial guarantees than the dead letter of ancient laws.

Széchenyi, who had resided abroad and studied Western institutions, was recognised as their leader of all those who wished to create a new Hungary out of the old. For years he and his friends educated public opinion by issuing innumerable pamphlets in which the new Liberalism was eloquently expounded. In particular Széchenyi insisted that the people must not look exclusively to the government, or even to the diet, for the necessary reforms. Society itself must take the initiative by breaking down the barriers of class exclusion and reviving a healthy notion of popular consciousness. The effect of this teaching was manifest at the diet of 1832, when the Liberals in the Lower Chamber had a large majority. Prominent among whom were Ferenc Deák and Ödön Beothy. In the Upper House, however, the magnates united with the government to form a conservative party obstinately opposed to any project of reform, which frustrated all the Liberals' efforts.

The journalist Lajos Kossuth became the new rising star of the Hungarian Parliament in the mid 1830s and began to rival Szécheny's popularity thanks to his talent as orator in the parliament's liberal faction. Kossuth called for broader parliamentary democracy, rapid industrialization, general taxation, economic expansion through exports, and the abolition of serfdom and aristocratic privileges (equality before the law). The government's alarm at the power and popularity of the Liberal party led it, soon after emperor Ferdinand I's accession in 1835, to attempt to crush the reform movement by arresting and imprisoning the most active agitators, including Kossuth and Miklós Wesselényi. However, the nation was no longer to be cowed, with the diet of 1839 refusing to proceed to business until the political prisoners were released. While in the Lower Chamber the reforming majority was larger than ever, a Liberal party now also formed in the Upper House under the leadership of Count Louis Batthyány and Baron Joseph Eotvos.

The results of the diet of 1839 did not satisfy the advanced Liberals, while the opposition of the government and of the Upper House still further fomented discontent in the general populace. This ill-feeling was also mainly fanned by the Pesti Hirlap, Hungary's first political newspaper, founded in 1841 by Kossuth. Its articles advocated armed reprisals if necessary, thus inflaming the extremists but alienating Széchenyi, who openly attacked Kossuth's opinions. Both sides produced violent polemics, but, as usual, the extreme views prevailed, and when the diet of 1843 convened Kossuth was more popular than ever while Széchenyi's influence had visibly declined. The tone of this diet was passionate, and the government was fiercely attacked for interfering with the elections. A new party called as Opposition party was created, which united the reform oriented Liberals, to oppose the conservatives. Fresh triumphs were won by the Liberals (the Opposition Party) – in 1844 the diet made Magyar the official language of administration, legislation and schooling in the Kingdom of Hungary, ending Latin's 844-year reign in that role, as well as freeing the peasants' holdings from all feudal obligations, legalising mixed marriages and throwing open official positions to non-nobles.

==== "Long debate" of reformers in the press (1841–1848) ====
The interval between the Diet of 1843 and that of 1847 saw the various political parties completely disintegrate and transform. Széchenyi openly joined the government, while the moderate Liberals separated from the extremists and formed a new party, the Centralists.

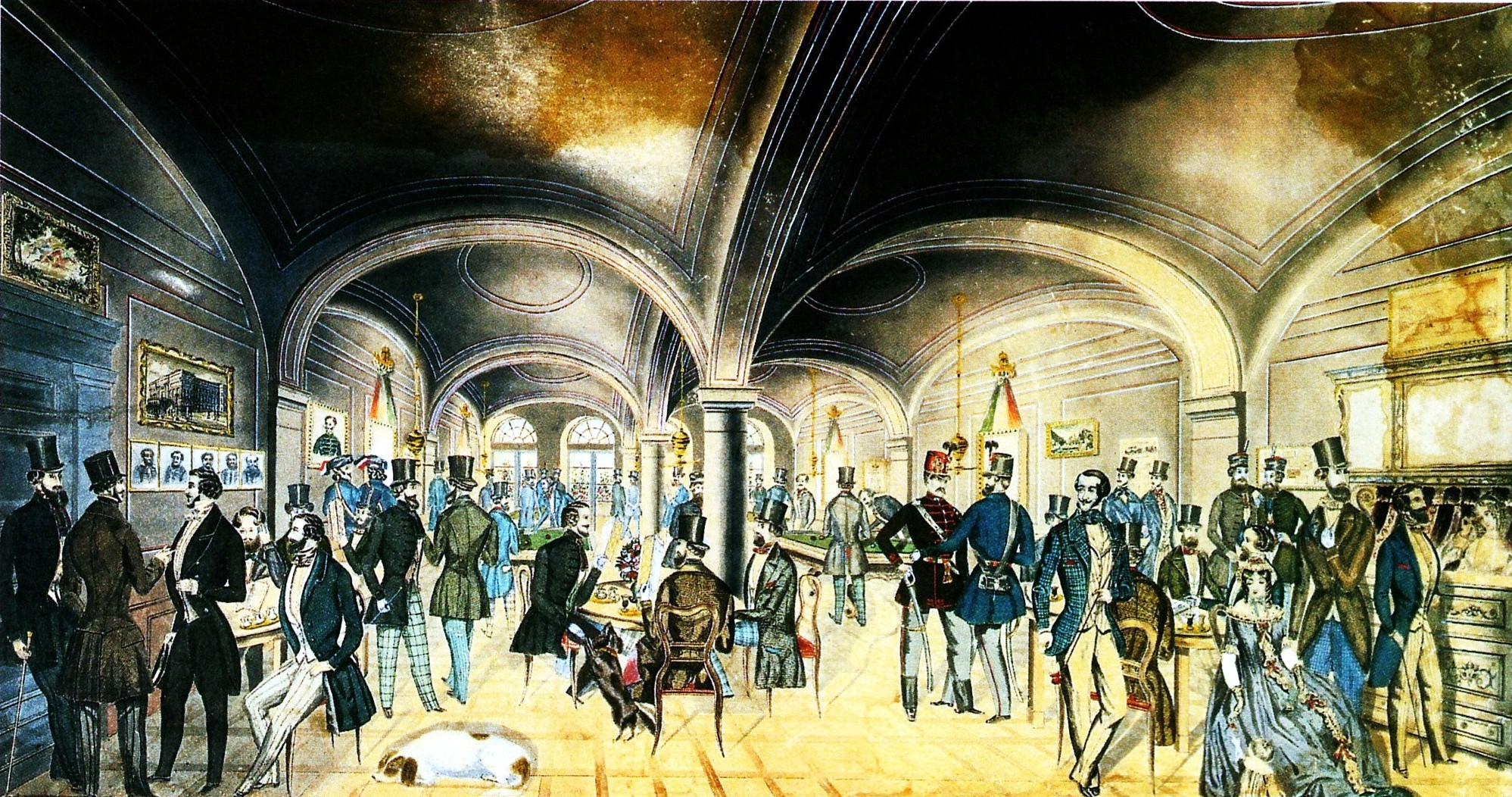
The entrance room of the Pilvax coffee palace at Pest in the 1840s

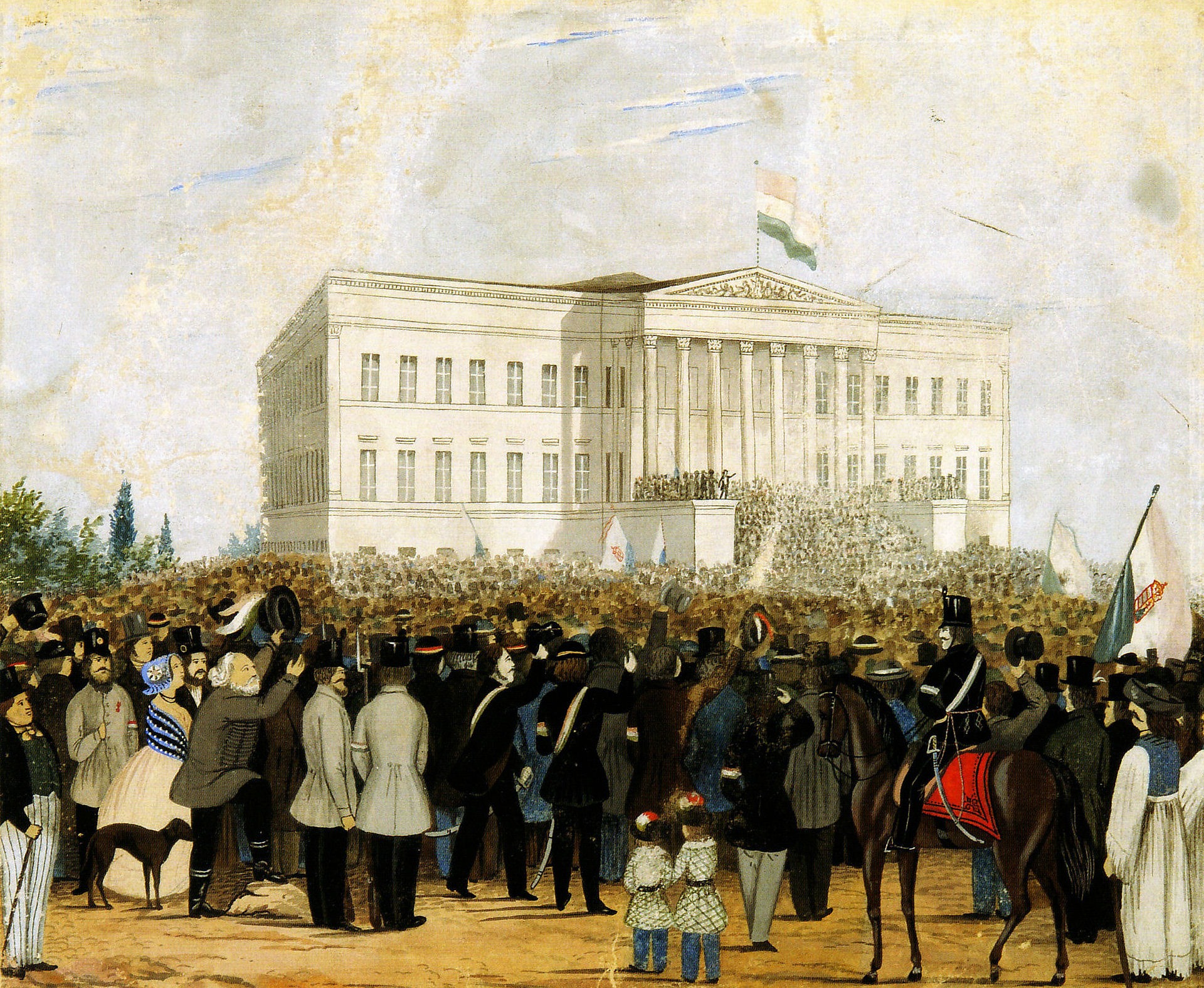
The National Song being recited at the National Museum

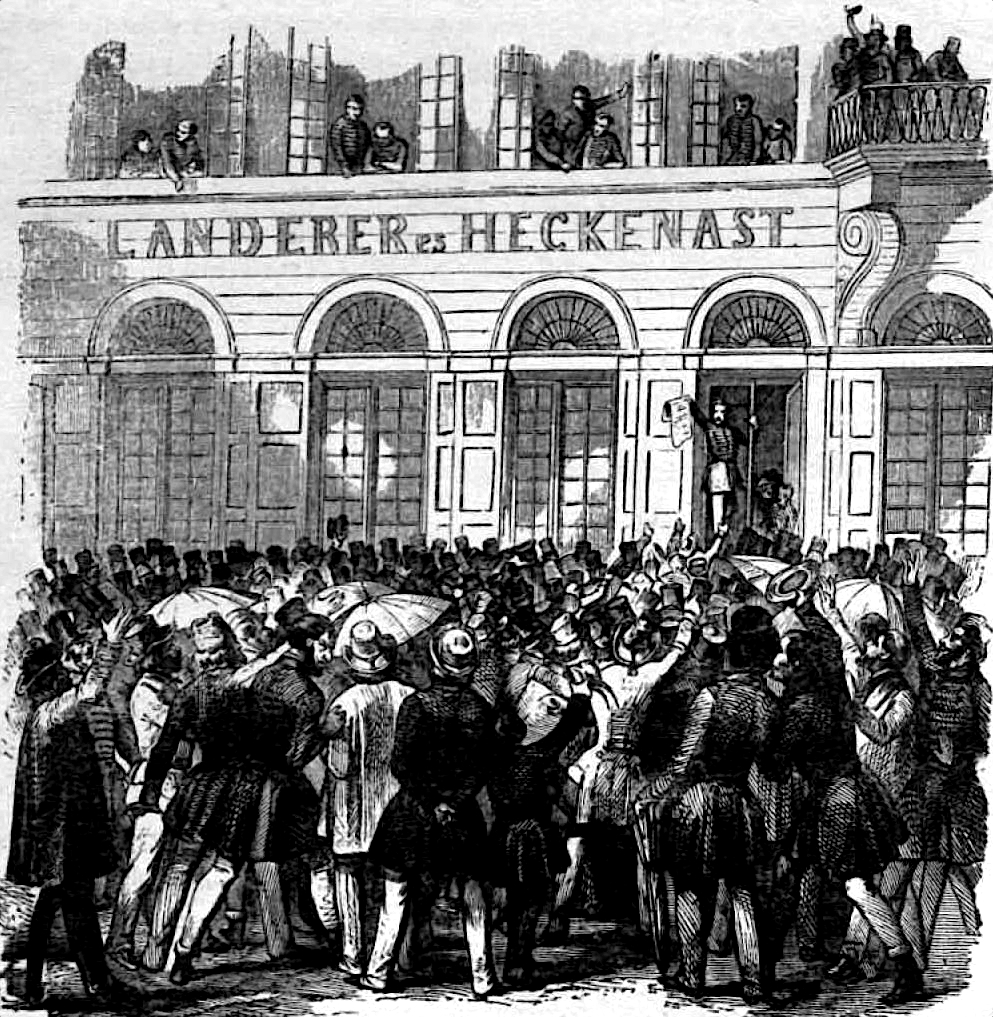
The crowd captured the Landerer & Heckenast printing house, where they printed the 12 points and the National Song. Thus 15 March became the memorial Day of the Freedom of the Press in Hungary.

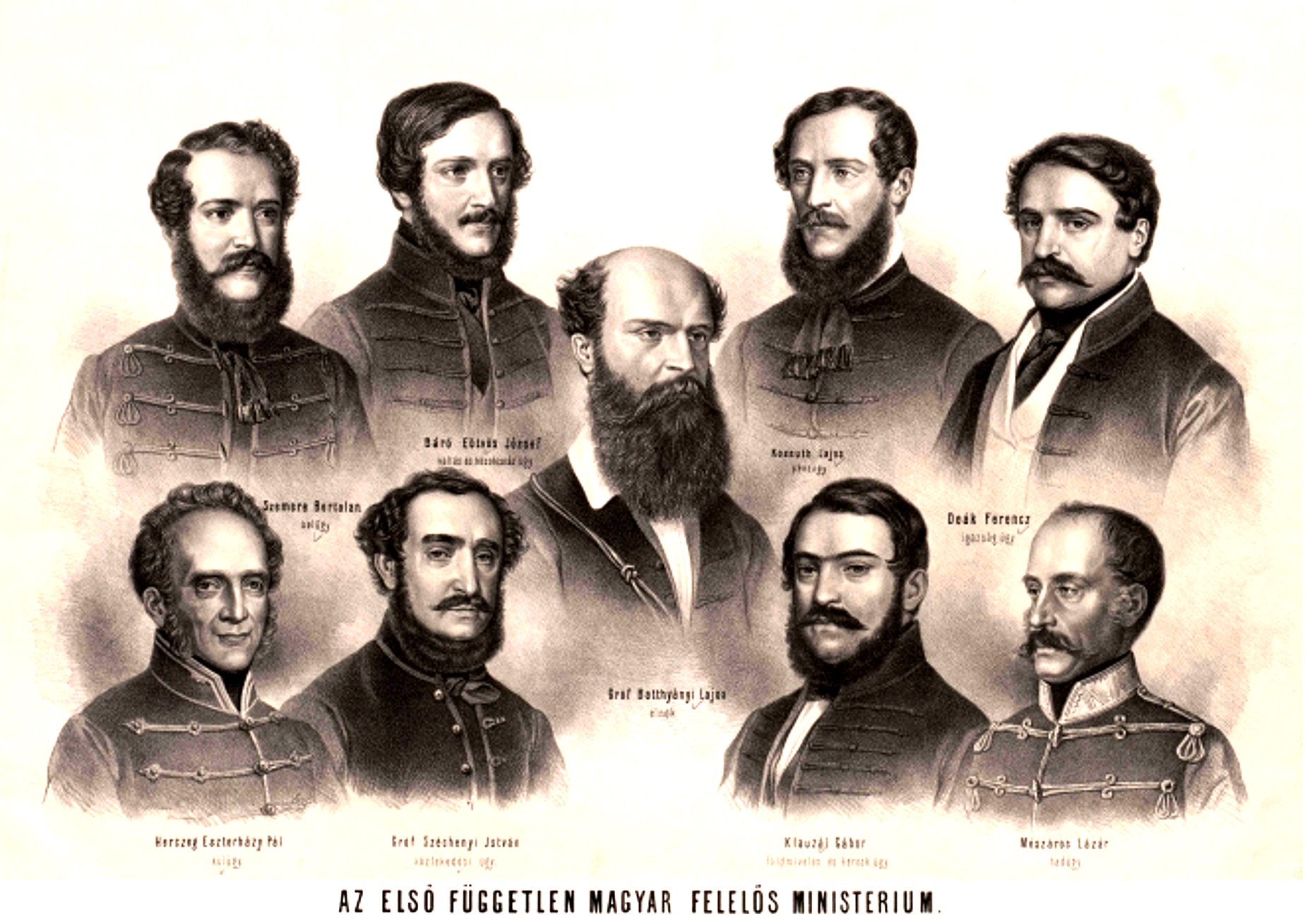
Members of the Batthyány government

In his 1841 pamphlet People of the East (Kelet Népe), Count Széchenyi analyzed Kossuth's policy and responded to Kossuth's reform proposals. Széchenyi believed that economic, political and social reforms should proceed slowly and with care, in order to avoid the potentially disastrous prospect of violent interference from the Habsburg dynasty. Széchenyi was aware of the spread of Kossuth's ideas in Hungarian society, which he felt overlooked the need for a good relationship with the Habsburg dynasty.

Kossuth, for his part, rejected the role of the aristocracy, and questioned the established norms of social status. In contrast to Széchenyi, Kossuth believed that in the process of social reform it would be impossible to restrain civil society in a passive role. According to Kossuth, the wider social movements can not be continually excluded from political life. Behind Kossuth's conception of society was a notion of freedom that emphasized the unitary origin of rights, which he saw manifested in universal suffrage. In exercising political rights, Széchenyi took into account wealth and education of the citizens, thus he supported only limited suffrage similar to the Western European (British, French and Belgian) limited suffrage of the era. In 1885, Kossuth called Széchenyi a liberal elitist aristocrat while Széchenyi considered himself to be a democrat.

Széchenyi was an isolationist politician while, according to Kossuth, strong relations and collaboration with international liberal and progressive movements are essential for the success of liberty. Regarding foreign policy, Kossuth and his followers refused the isolationist policy of Széchenyi, thus they stood on the ground of the liberal internationalism: They supported countries and political forces that aligned with their moral and political standards. They also believed that political movements sharing the same modern liberal values should form an alliance against the "feudalist" conservatives.

Széchenyi based his economic policy on the laissez-faire principles practised by the British Empire, while Kossuth supported protective tariffs due to the comparatively weak Hungarian industrial sector. While Kossuth envisaged the construction of a rapidly industrialized country, Széchenyi wanted to preserve the traditionally strong agricultural sector as the main bedrock of the economy.

==== "The Twelve Points" of the reformers ====
The conservatives – who usually opposed most of the reforms – thought they could maintain a slim majority in the old feudal parliament, as the reformer liberals were divided between the ideas of Széchenyi and Kossuth. Immediately before the elections, however, Deák succeeded in reuniting all the Liberals on the common platform of "The Twelve Points". The twelve points served as basis for the later April laws. They were as follows:

1. Freedom of the Press (The abolition of censorship and the censor's offices)
2. Accountable ministries in Buda and Pest (Instead of the simple royal appointment of ministers, all ministers and the government must be elected and dismissed by the parliament)
3. An annual parliamentary session in Pest. (instead of the rare ad-hoc sessions which were convened by the king)
4. Civil and religious equality before the law. (The abolition of separate laws for the common people and nobility, the abolition of the legal privileges of nobility. Full religious liberty instead of moderated tolerance: the abolition of (Catholic) state religion)
5. National Guard. (The forming of their own Hungarian national guard, it worked like a police force to keep the law and order during the transition of the system, thus preserving the morality of the revolution)
6. Joint share of tax burdens. (abolition of the tax exemption of the nobility, the abolition of customs and tariff exemption of the nobility)
7. The abolition of socage. (abolition of Feudalism and abolition of the serfdom of peasantry and their bondservices)
8. Juries and representation on an equal basis. (The common people can be elected as juries at the legal courts, all people can be officials even at the highest levels of public administration and the judiciary, if they have the prescribed education)
9. National Bank.
10. The army to swear to support the constitution, our soldiers should not be sent abroad, and foreign soldiers should leave our country.
11. The freeing of political prisoners.
12. Union. (with Transylvania, including the re-union of the Hungarian and Transylvanian parliaments, which became separate during the Ottoman wars)

The ensuing parliamentary elections resulted in a complete victory for the Progressives. This was also the last election which was based on the parliamentary system of the old feudal estates. All efforts to bring about an understanding between the government and the opposition were fruitless. Kossuth demanded not merely the redress of actual grievances, but a liberal reform which would make grievances impossible in the future. In the highest circles a dissolution of the diet now seemed to be the sole remedy; but, before it could be carried out, tidings of the February revolution in Paris reached Pressburg on 1 March, and on 3 March Kossuth's motion for the appointment of an independent, responsible ministry was accepted by the Lower House. The moderates, alarmed not so much by the motion itself as by its tone, again tried to intervene; but on 13 March the Vienna revolution broke out, and the Emperor, yielding to pressure or panic, appointed Count Louis Batthyány premier of the first Hungarian responsible ministry, which included Kossuth, Széchenyi and Deák.

== The one day bloodless revolution in Pest and Buda ==
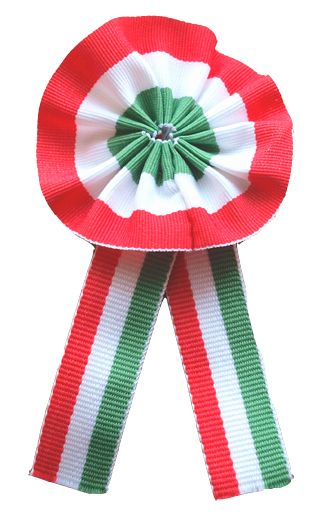
The Hungarian cockade used in 1848

=== Revolution in Vienna ===
The crisis came from abroad – as Kossuth expected – and he used it to the full. On 3 March 1848, shortly after the news of the revolution in Paris had arrived, in a speech of surpassing power he demanded parliamentary government for Hungary and constitutional government for the rest of Austria. He appealed to the hope of the Habsburgs, "our beloved Archduke Franz Joseph" (then seventeen years old), to perpetuate the ancient glory of the dynasty by meeting half-way the aspirations of a free people. He at once became a massively popular revolutionary speaker across Austria and most of continental Europe; his speech was read aloud in the streets of Vienna to the mob by which Metternich was overthrown (13 March), and when a deputation from the Diet visited Vienna to receive the assent of Emperor Ferdinand to their petition it was Kossuth who received the chief ovation.

The arrival of the news of the revolution in Paris, and Kossuth's German speech about freedom and human rights had whipped up the passions of Austrian crowd in Vienna on 13 March. While the Viennese masses celebrated Kossuth as their hero, revolution broke out in Buda on 15 March; Kossuth traveled home immediately.

=== Revolution in Pest ===
The process of commodity production and capitalization slowly reshaped the social conditions and the world view of the nobility, which began to advocate the human and civil rights in Hungary since the reform era. Recent studies of social history have also suggested that the so-called "youth of March", the plebeian intelligentsia, should not be seen as a separate phenomenon in itself, but as an intellectual vanguard of an emerging societal strata that can be classified as the petty bourgeoisie. They did not represent a measurable political and economic force in a comparison with the nobility in the nationwide scene, but in historically critical situations, especially in the more developed, larger urban centers, they could still prove to become a significant or even the determinant factor. Politically, the petty bourgeoisie was the bearer of radical, republican aspirations similar to the French and German political events.

The revolution started in the Pilvax coffee house at Pest, which was a favourite meeting point of the young extra-parliamentary radical liberal intellectuals in the 1840s. Early that morning, Sándor Petőfi hurried to the Pilvax café, where the young people gathered. He found Pál Vasvári and Gyula Bulyovszky there, invited them to the apartment of Mór Jókai, where a proclamation was edited for the 12 points. Around 8 o'clock, Petőfi and his companions went to the Pilvax café, and only six appeared at the set time (Petőfi, Jókai, Bulyovszky, Sebő, Ernő Gaál and Dániel Hamary). Here Jókai read out the 12 points and the proclamation. Petofi recited his new poem the National Song.

From here – according to a preliminary agreement – they went first to the University of Law on University Street. A group of students was already waiting for them in the yard and they immediately brought a chair for Petőfi and Jókai, here Petőfi recited his poem written the night before, the National Song, and Jókai read the 12 points. From here they went to the Medical University on Újvilág Street, where the students also interrupted their university lectures and acted similarly in the courtyard, and later in front of the students of the Faculty of Engineering and Philosophy; the very same choreography happened in the University Square too. By this time, not only were they surrounded by a large crowd of youth, but they were also joined by a large audience from the street, which grew. Petőfi has decided that the people would fulfill the first point of the 12 points, the freedom of the press, by his own authority, which he did. At 10 O'clock they went to the Landerer Publishing and Press company (the largest in the city) on the Hatvani street. Saw the enthusianism of the crowd, Petőfi renamed the Hatvani Street to Street of the Free Press. " The print owner gave in, and immediately translating the desired documents into German, a few moments later, thousands came out of the fast press, copies of which were distributed to a gathering audience incessantly despite the pouring rain."

It was only around noon that the raging crowd dispersed, agreeing to go to Buda in the afternoon to release Mihály Táncsics, a political prisoner. A symbol of Petőfi's famous day, activists distributed a three-colored Hungarian cockade to the crowd.

At 3 p.m., a mass demonstration was held in Museum Square at the front of the building of the Hungarian National Museum, and thousands of copies of the National Song and 12 points were distributed; from there they went to the town hall, urging the adoption of the 12 points. The gathered people decided to head to the town hall and there called on the city council to sign their wishes. The council hall opened, the items of the program were submitted to the council, which were accepted by the council members and was signed by the clerk of the town council too.

They immediately elected a regular commission, of which Petőfi was a member. The people, appointing their temporary committee, wished the political prisoner Mihály Táncsics – who had been arrested in Buda by the censor's officers – to be released from prison. In order to fulfill this wish, he moved to Buda around 5 o'clock pm, and gathered around his battalion in the courtyard of the official building, steadfastly stood by his wishes, while his constituency declared: the election of a press court from among the people; . Ferenc Zichy, the chairman of the council, immediately released Táncsics, dragged his car from Buda to the National Theater Square with his own hands, and entered the theater.

On the afternoon of this day, the people wanted József Bajza, the deputy director of the national theater, to perform the banned opera Bánk bán in the theater with full lighting for the celebration of this day. The actors took the stage with cockades of national color, Gábor Egressy sang the National Song, the choir sang the Hungarian Hymn and the National Song. The majority of the audience wanted Táncsics to appear on the stage, but when he became aware of its ailing condition, he gave up his wish. Eventually, the people dispersed alongside the Rákóczi runner-up. However, the standing committee sat together until morning.

The next day, on 16 March, Pál Nyáry, the deputy mayor of Pest County, Lipót Rottenbiller, the deputy mayor of Pest and others, took the head of the movement and thus the events became of national significance. It was the very first task of the troubled people to demand the immediate entry of the National Guard, and by this time they had begun collecting signatures, and in a few hours thousands of signatures had been collected. The people demanded the weapons. The military authority reported that it could only give 500 weapons because the rest were taken to Komárom. And below, the people, who had already gone to about 20–25 thousand, demanded the weapons and threatened to break into the arsenal if they did not get the weapon. A subcommittee was then appointed on the distribution of weapons for the national guards, and after an hour of deliberation, Rottenbiller reassured the people gathered in the hall, and Jókai reassured the crowd by announcing a bill alternately as national guards at night to take care of law and order.

In the evening, the two sister cities were fully illuminated, a crowd of enthusiastic people roared in the streets, shouting, "Long live freedom!" From the windows hung national flags embroidered with the name of freedom. Throughout the night, order and tranquility guarded the city, with raiding national guards who arrested wanted criminals, vagrants, and looters hiding in several locations who wanted to take advantage of the turbulent situation of the day.

The bloodless mass demonstrations in Pest and Buda forced the Imperial governor to accept all twelve of their demands.

Austria had its own problems with the revolution in Vienna that year, and it initially acknowledged Hungary's government. Therefore, the Governor-General's officers, acting in the name of the King, appointed Hungary's new parliament with Lajos Batthyány as its first Prime Minister. The Austrian monarchy also made other concessions to subdue the Viennese masses: on 13 March 1848, Prince Klemens von Metternich was made to resign his position as the Austrian Government's Chancellor. He then fled to London for his own safety.

== Parliamentary monarchy, the Batthyány government ==
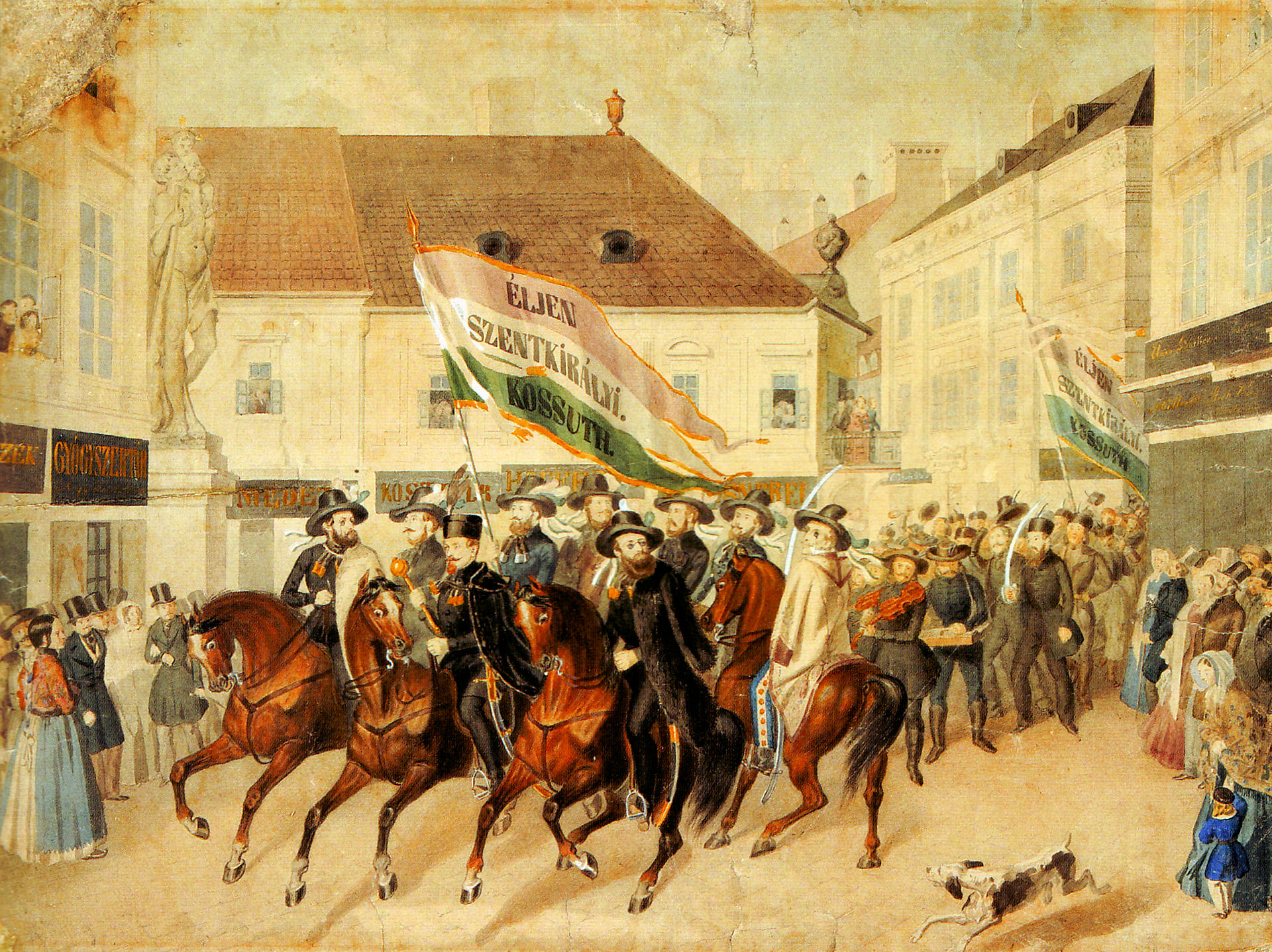
A parliamentary election campaign of a candidate

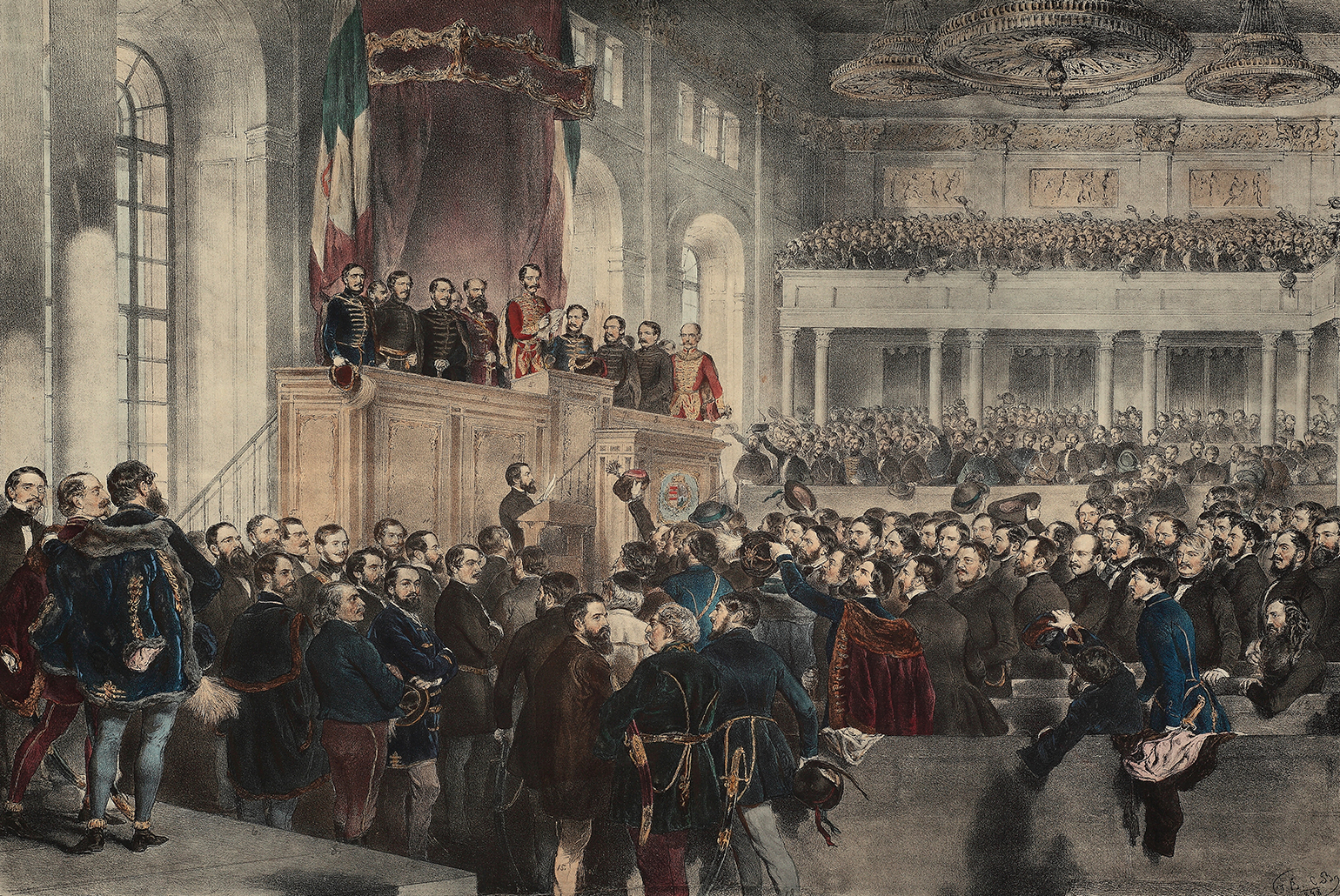
5 July 1848: The opening ceremony of the first parliament, which was based on popular representation. The members of the first responsible government are on the balcony.

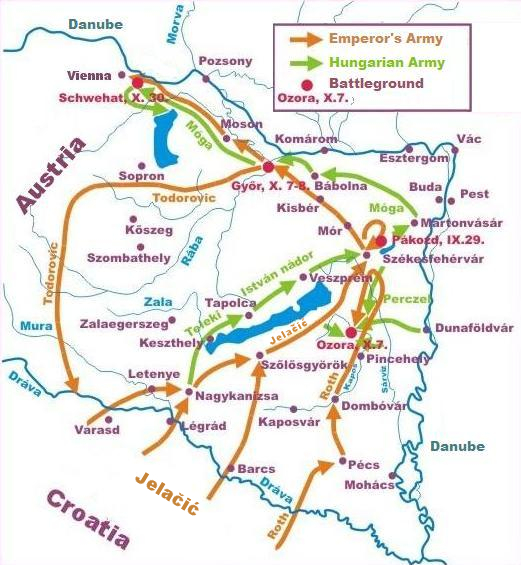
Jelačić's attacks in the last quarter of 1848

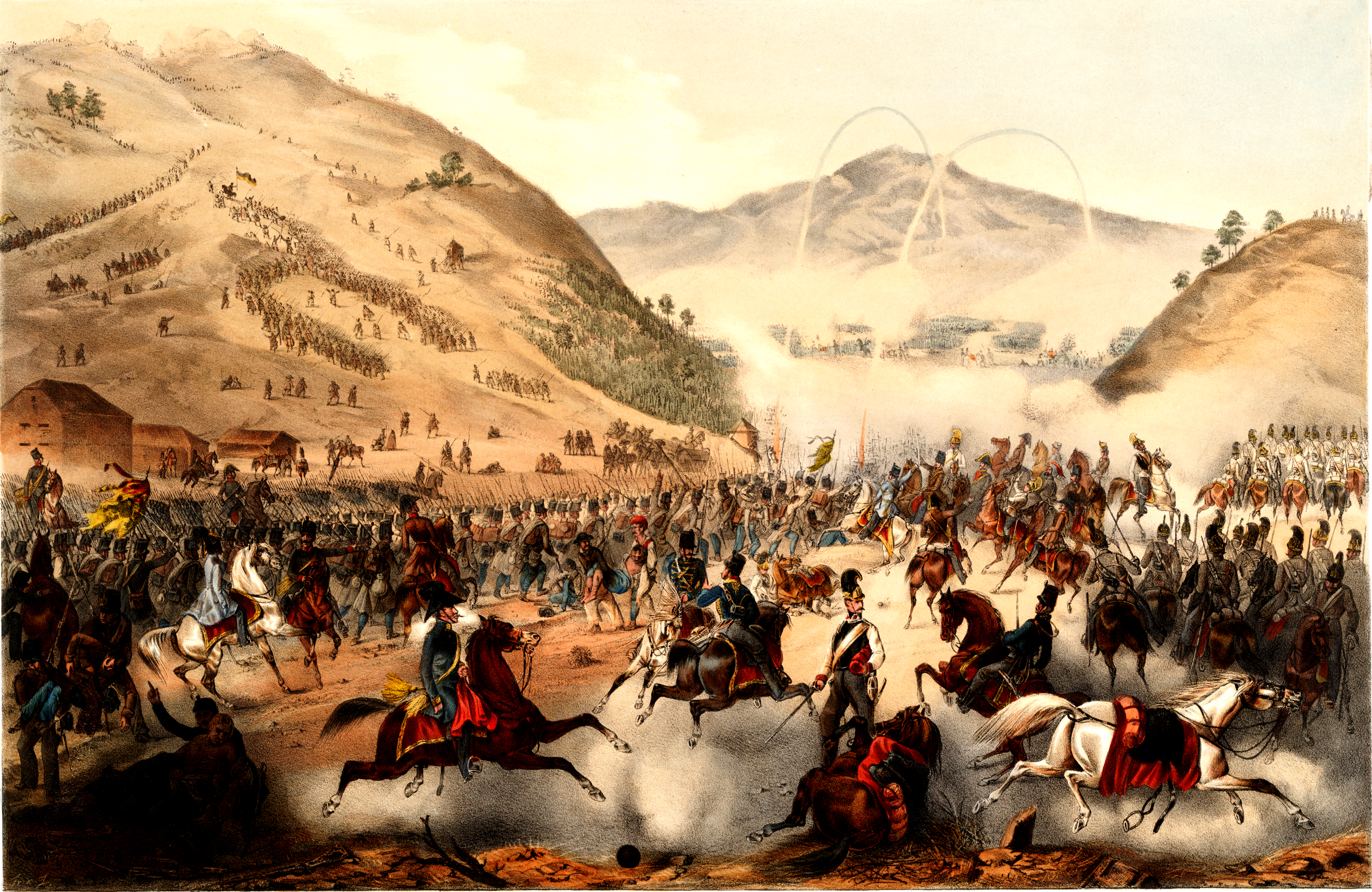
Battle of Pákozd was a draw that pushed the loyalist Croatian forces towards Vienna and away from Pest.

On 17 March 1848 the Emperor assented and Batthyány created the first Hungarian responsible government(cabinet Batthyány). On 23 March 1848, as head of government, Batthyány commended his government to the Diet.

The first responsible government was formed with Lajos Batthyány serving as Prime Minister. With the exception of Lajos Kossuth, all members of the government were the supporters of Széchenyi's ideas.

The Twelve Points, or the March Laws as they were now called, were then adopted by the legislature and received royal assent on 10 April. Hungary had, to all intents and purposes, become an independent state bound to Austria only by the Austrian Archduke as Palatine. The new government approved a sweeping reform package, referred to as the "April laws", which created a democratic political system. The newly established government also demanded that the Habsburg Empire spend all taxes they received from Hungary in Hungary itself, and that the Parliament should have authority over the Hungarian regiments of the Habsburg Army.

The new suffrage law (Act V of 1848) transformed the old feudal estates based parliament (Estates General) into a democratic representative parliament. This law offered the widest suffrage right in Europe at the time. The first general parliamentary elections were held in June, which were based on popular representation instead of feudal forms. The reform oriented political forces won the elections. The electoral system and franchise were similar to the contemporary British system.

At that time the internal affairs and foreign policy of Hungary were not stable, and Batthyány faced multiple problems. His first and most important act was to organize the armed forces and the local governments. He insisted that the Austrian army, when in Hungary, would come under Hungarian law, and this was conceded by the Austrian Empire. He tried to repatriate conscript soldiers from Hungary. He established the Organisation of Militiamen, whose job was to ensure internal security of the country.

Batthyány was a capable leader, but he was stuck in the middle of a clash between the Austrian monarchy and the Hungarian separatists. He was devoted to the constitutional monarchy and aimed to keep the constitution, but the Emperor was dissatisfied with his work.

Josip Jelačić was Ban (Viceroy) of Croatia and Dalmatia, regions in personal union with the Kingdom of Hungary. He was opposed to the new Hungarian government, and raised troops in his domains. Legally this meant that a monarch was preparing to attack one of his country's appointed and lawful government with another of his country's army.

In the summer of 1848, the Hungarian government, seeing the civil war ahead, tried to get the Habsburgs' support against Jelačić. They offered to send troops to northern Italy. In August 1848, the Imperial Government in Vienna officially ordered the Hungarian government in Pest not to form an army.

On 29 August, with the assent of parliament, Batthyány went with Ferenc Deák to the Emperor to ask him to order the Serbs to capitulate and stop Jelačić, who was going to attack Hungary. But Jelačić went ahead and invaded Hungary to dissolve the Hungarian government, without any order from Austria.

Though the Emperor formally relieved Jelačić of his duties, Jelačić and his army invaded Muraköz (Međimurje) and the Southern Transdanubian parts of Hungary on 11 September 1848.

After the Austrian revolution in Vienna was defeated, Franz Joseph I of Austria replaced his uncle Ferdinand I of Austria, who was not of sound mind. Franz Joseph didn't recognise Batthyány's second premiership, which began on 25 September. In addition, Franz Joseph was not recognized as king of Hungary by the Hungarian parliament, and he was not crowned king of Hungary until 1867. In the end, the final break between Vienna and Pest occurred when Field-Marshal Count Franz Philipp von Lamberg was given control of all armies in Hungary (including Jelačić's). He went to Hungary where he was mobbed and brutally murdered. Following his murder the Imperial court dissolved the Hungarian Diet and appointed Jelačić as Regent.

Meanwhile, Batthyány travelled again to Vienna to seek a compromise with the new Emperor. His efforts remained unsuccessful, because Franz Joseph refused to accept the reforms, which were known as the "April laws". This was unconstitutional, as the laws had already been signed by his uncle King Ferdinand, and he had no right to revoke them.

Hungarian liberals in Pest saw this as an opportunity. In September 1848, the Diet made concessions to the Pest Uprising, so as not to break up the Austro-Hungarian Union. But the counter-revolutionary forces were gathering. After multiple local victories, the combined Bohemian and Croatian armies entered Pest on 5 January 1849.

Consequently, Batthyány and his government resigned, except for Kossuth, Szemere, and Mészáros. Later, on Palatine Stephen's request, Batthyány became Prime Minister again. On 13 September Batthyány announced a rebellion and requested that the Palatine lead them. However the Palatine, under the Emperor's orders, resigned and left Hungary.

Hungary now had war raging on four fronts: Jelačić's Croatian troops to the South; Romanians in Banat to the South-East; Austrian troops led by Karl von Urban and Romanian insurgents headed by Avram Iancu in Transylvania to the East; and Austrian main forces under the supreme commander of Windischgrätz to the west.

The Hungarian government was in serious military crisis due to the lack of soldiers, therefore they sent Kossuth (a brilliant orator) to recruit volunteers for the new Hungarian army. While Jelačić was marching on Pest, Kossuth went from town to town rousing the people to the defence of the country, and the popular force of the Honvéd was his creation.

With the help of Kossuth's recruiting speeches, Batthyány quickly formed the Hungarian Revolutionary Army. 40% of private soldiers in the revolutionary army consisted of ethnic minorities of the country. The new Hungarian army defeated the Croatians on 29 September at the Battle of Pákozd.

The battle became an icon for the Hungarian army for its effect on politics and morale. Kossuth's second letter for the Austrian people and this battle were the causes of the second revolution in Vienna on 6 October.

Batthyány slowly realized that he could not reach his main goal, which was peaceful compromise with the Habsburg dynasty. On 2 October he resigned and simultaneously resigned his seat in parliament. The ministers of his cabinet also resigned on the same day.

=== The Austrian Stadion Constitution and the renewal of antagonism ===
The Habsburg government in Vienna proclaimed a new constitution, the so-called Stadion Constitution on 4 March 1849. The centralist Stadion Constitution provided strong power for the monarch, and marked the way of neo-absolutism. The new March Constitution of Austria was drafted by the Imperial Diet of Austria, where Hungary had no representation. Austrian legislative bodies like the Imperial Diet traditionally had no power in Hungary. Despite this, the Imperial Diet also tried to abolish the Diet of Hungary (which had existed as the supreme legislative power in Hungary since the late 12th century.) The Austrian Stadion constitution attempted to contradict the existing constitution of Hungary, with a view to its abolition. Even the territorial integrity of the country was in danger: on 7 March an imperial proclamation was issued in the name of the emperor Francis Joseph establishing a united constitution for the whole empire, of which the Kingdom of Hungary was carved up into five independent military districts.

== Szemere government and Regent-President Lajos Kossuth ==
When Batthyány resigned he was appointed with Szemere to carry on the government provisionally, and at the end of September Kossuth was made President of the Committee of National Defence.

From a constitutional point of view, and according to the coronation oath, a crowned Hungarian King cannot abdicate the Hungarian throne during his lifetime. If the king is alive but unable do his duty as ruler, a governor (or, in English, regent) had to undertake the royal duties. Therefore, Ferdinand remained still the legal king of Hungary. If there was no possibility of inheriting the throne automatically due to the death of the predecessor king (as king Ferdinand was still alive), but the monarch was wanting to relinquish his throne and appoint another king before his death, there was technically only one legal solution: the parliament had the power to dethrone the monarch and elect his successor as the new king of Hungary. Owing to the legal and military tensions, the Hungarian parliament did not grant Franz Joseph this honour. This event gave to the Hungarian resistance a solid foundation of legality. From this time until the collapse of the revolution, Lajos Kossuth, as head of state of Hungary, became the de facto and de jure ruler of the country. With the exception of Kázmér Batthyány, all members of the new cabinet were Kossuth's supporters.

The new government (the Szemere administration) was formed on 2 May 1849:

- Head of state, Lajos Kossuth.
- Prime Minister and Minister of the Interior, Bertalan Szemere
- Foreign Minister, Minister of Agriculture, Industry and Trade : Kázmér Batthyány
- Finance Minister: Ferenc Duschek
- Minister of Justice: Sebő Vukovics
- Minister of Education, Science and Culture: Mihály Horváth
- Minister of Labour, Infrastructure and Transport: László Csány
- Minister of Defence: Lázár Mészáros (14 April – 1 May 1849) Artúr Görgey (7 May – 7 July 1849) and Lajos Aulich (14 July – 11 August 1849)

From this time he had an increased amount of power. The direction of the whole government was in his hands. Without military experience, he had to control and direct the movements of armies; he was unable to keep control over the generals or to establish that military co-operation so essential to success. Arthur Görgey in particular, whose abilities Kossuth was the first to recognize, refused obedience; the two men were very different personalities. Twice Kossuth deposed him from the command; twice he had to restore him. It would have been well if Kossuth had had something more of Görgey's calculated ruthlessness, for, as has been rightly said, the revolutionary power he had seized could only be held by revolutionary means; but he was by nature soft-hearted and always merciful; though often audacious, he lacked decision in dealing with men. It has been said that he showed a want of personal courage; this is not improbable, the excess of feeling which made him so great an orator could hardly be combined with the coolness in danger required of a soldier; but no one was able, as he was, to infuse courage into others.

Throughout the terrible winter which followed, his energy and spirit never failed him. It was he who overcame the reluctance of the army to march to the relief of Vienna; after the defeat at the Battle of Schwechat, at which he was present, he sent Józef Bem to carry on the war in Transylvania. At the end of the year, when the Austrians were approaching Pest, he asked for the mediation of Mr William Henry Stiles (1808–1865), the American envoy. Alfred I, Prince of Windisch-Grätz, however, refused all terms, and the Diet and government fled to Debrecen, Kossuth taking with him the Crown of St Stephen, the sacred emblem of the Hungarian nation. In November 1848, Emperor Ferdinand abdicated in favour of Franz Joseph. The new Emperor revoked all the concessions granted in March and outlawed Kossuth and the Hungarian government – set up lawfully on the basis of the April laws. In April 1849, when the Hungarians had won multiple successes, after sounding the army, Kossuth issued the celebrated Hungarian Declaration of Independence, in which he declared that "the house of Habsburg-Lorraine, perjured in the sight of God and man, had forfeited the Hungarian throne." It was a step characteristic of his love for extreme and dramatic action, but it added to the dissensions between him and those who wished only for autonomy under the old dynasty, and his enemies did not hesitate to accuse him of aiming for kingship. The dethronement also made any compromise with the Habsburgs practicably impossible.

Kossuth played a key role in tying down the Hungarian army for weeks for the siege and recapture of Buda castle, finally successful on 21 May 1849. The hopes of ultimate success were, however, frustrated by the intervention of Russia; all appeals to the western powers were vain, and on 11 August, Kossuth abdicated in favor of Görgey, on the ground that in the last extremity the general alone could save the nation. Görgey capitulated at Világos (now Şiria, Romania) to the Russians, who handed over the army to the Austrians.

=== Relations with the Nationalities ===
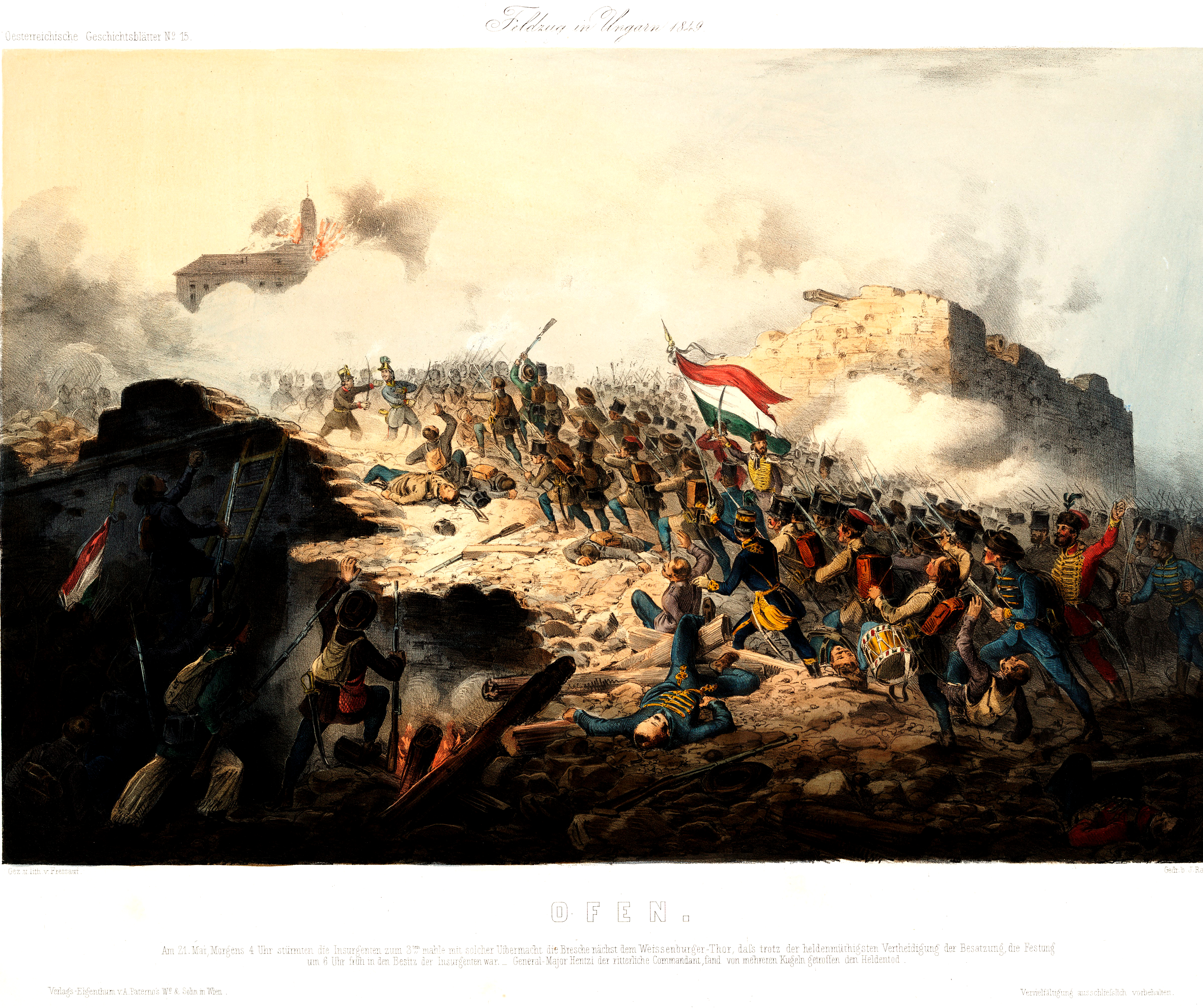
The Siege of Buda in May 1849

In 1848 and 1849, the Hungarian people or Magyars, who wanted independence, formed a majority only in the central areas of the country. The Hungarians were surrounded by other nationalities.

In 1848–49, the Austrian monarchy and those advising them manipulated the Croatians, Serbians and Romanians, making promises to the Magyars one day and making conflicting promises to the Serbs and other groups the next. Some of these groups were led to fight against the Hungarian Government by their leaders who were striving for their own independence; this triggered a number of brutal incidents between the Magyars and Romanians among others.

In 1848 and 1849, however, the Hungarians were supported by most Slovaks, Germans, Rusyns and Hungarian Slovenes, the Hungarian Jews, and a number of Polish, Austrian and Italian volunteers. On 28 July 1849, the Hungarian Revolutionary Parliament proclaimed and enacted the first laws on ethnic and minority rights in Europe, an act acknowledging the rights of non-Hungarians to use their own language on local and minor administrative levels and to maintain their own schools. But these were overturned after the Russian and Austrian armies crushed the Hungarian Revolution. Occasionally, the Austrian throne would overplay their hand in their tactics of divide and conquer in Hungary – with some quite unintended results. This happened in the case of the Slovaks who had begun the war as at least indifferent if not positively anti-Magyar but came to support the Hungarian Government against the Dynasty. But in another case, the Austrians' double-dealing brought some even more surprising new allies to the Hungarian cause during the war in 1849.

==== Croats ====
The Kingdom of Croatia had been in a personal union with the kingdom of Hungary since the 12th century. Croatian nationalism was weak in the beginning of the 19th century, but grew with increasing Hungarian pressure, especially the April Laws that ignored Croatian autonomy under Hungarian Kingdom.

In response, Croatian leaders called for a distinct Triune Kingdom. Ban Josip Jelačić, who would go on to be a revered Croatian hero, sought to free Croatia from Hungary as a separate entity under the Habsburgs. Eventually, he traveled to Vienna to take oaths to become counsel of Austrian Emperor. Soon after Lajos Kossuth declared an independent Kingdom of Hungary dethroning the Habsburgs, the Croats rebelled against the Hungarians and declared their loyalty to Austria. The first fighting in the Hungarian revolution was between the Croats and Magyars, and Austria's intervention on the part of their loyal Croatian subjects caused an upheaval in Vienna. Jelačić sent his army under the order of him, hoping to suppress the increasing power of Hungarian revolutionaries, but failed and was repelled by the Hungarians on 29 September near Pákozd.

With the end of Hungarian Revolution, Croatia would be directly ruled by Austria until the Croatian–Hungarian Settlement in the 1860s.

==== Serbs of Vojvodina ====
Vojvodina became a Hungarian Crown Land after the defeat of the Ottoman Empire in the Great Turkish War.

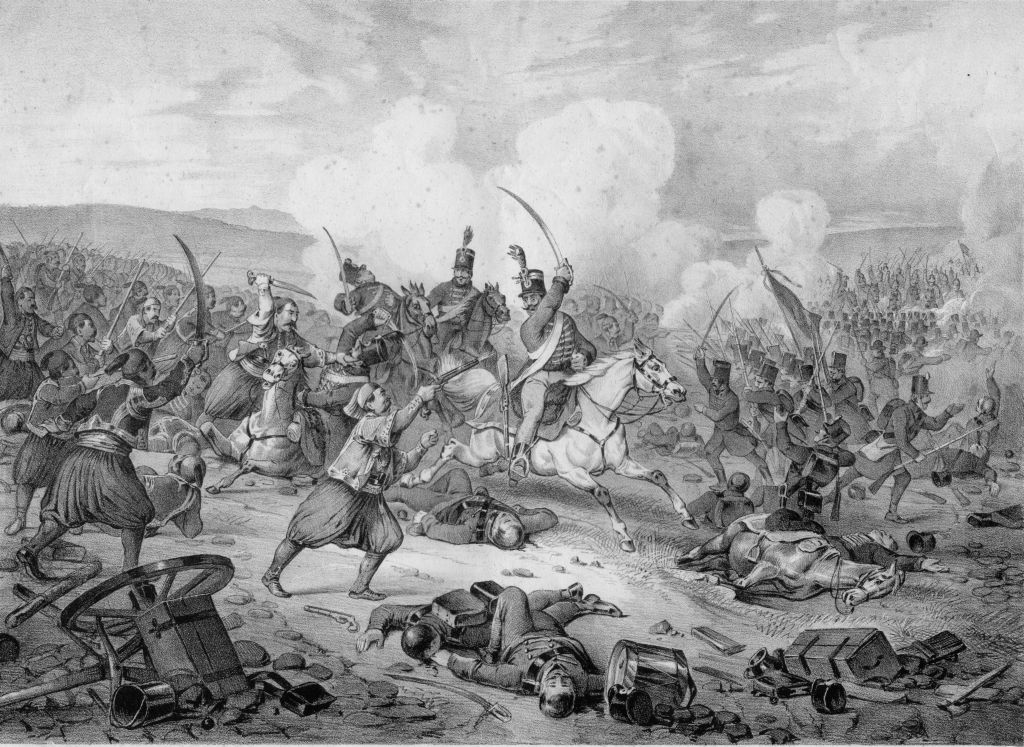
Battle of Vršac, between army of Serbian Vojvodina and Hungarian army, January 1849

Between the Tisza river and Transylvania, north of the Danube lies the former region of Hungary called the "Banat". After the Battle of Mohács, under Ottoman rule the area north of the Danube saw an influx of Southern Slavs along with the invading Ottoman army. In 1804 the semi-independent Principality of Serbia had formed south of the Danube with Belgrade as its capital. So in 1849, the Danube divided Serbia from the Kingdom of Hungary. The Hungarian district on the northern side of the river was called "Vojvodina", and by that time it was home to almost half a million Serbian inhabitants. According to the census of 1840 in Vojvodina Serbs comprised 49% of the total population. The Serbs of Vojvodina had sought their independence or attachment with the Principality of Serbia on the other side of the Danube. In face of the emerging Hungarian independence movement leading up to the 1848 Revolution the Austrian monarchy had promised an independent status for the Serbs of Vojvodina within the Austrian Empire.

Toward this end, Josif Rajačić was appointed Patriarch of Vojvodina in February 1849. Rajačić was a supporter of the Serbian national movement, although somewhat conservative with pro-Austrian leanings. At a crucial point during the war against the Hungarian Government, in late March 1849 when the Austrians needed more Serbian soldiers to fight the war, the Austrian General Juraj Rukavina Vidovgradski, who commanded the Austrian troops in Hungary, officially re-stated this promise of independence for Vojvodina and conceded to all the demands of the Patriarch regarding Serbian nationhood. Acquiescence to the demands of the Patriarch should have meant a relaxation of the strict military administration of Vojvodina. Under this military administration in the border areas, any male between the ages of 16 years and 60 years of age could be conscripted into the army.

The Serbs of Vojvodina were expecting their requirement for Austrian military conscription to be the first measure to be relaxed. But the new Emperor Franz Joseph had other ideas and this promise was broken not more than two weeks after it had been made to the people of Vojvodina. This caused a split in the population of the Vojvodina and at least part of the Serbs in that province began to support the elected Hungarian Government against the Austrians. Some Serbs sought to ingratiate the Serb nation with the Austrian Empire to promote the independence of Vojvodina.

With war on three fronts the Hungarian Government should have been squashed immediately upon the start of hostilities. However, events early in the war worked in favor of the Government. The unity of the Serbs on the southern front was ruined by Austrian perfidy over the legal status of Vojvodina.

Some right-wing participants in the Serbian national movement felt that a "revolution" in Hungary more threatened the prerogatives of landowners, and the nobles in Serbian Vojvodina, than the occupying Austrians.

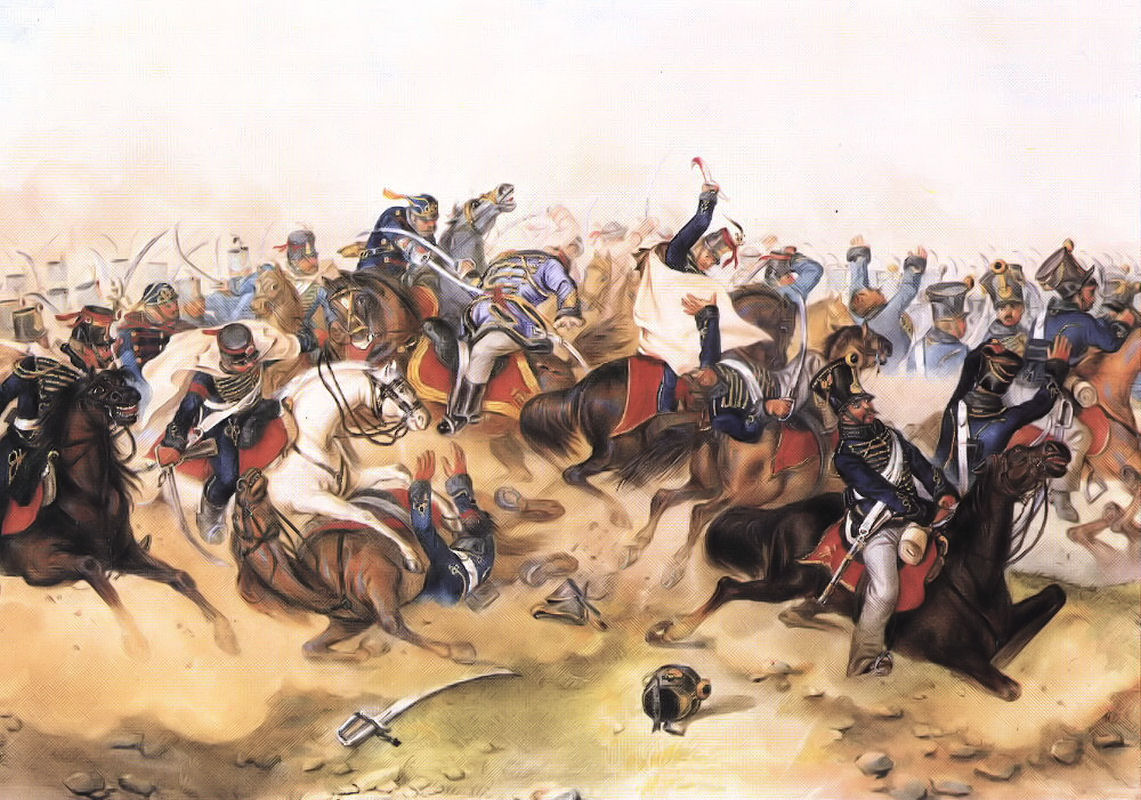
Battle at Tápióbicske (4 April 1849) by Mór Than

At the start of the war, the Hungarian Defence Forces (Honvédség) won some battles against the Austrians, for example at the Battle of Pákozd in September 1848 and at the Isaszeg in April 1849, at which time they even stated the Hungarian Declaration of Independence from the Habsburg Empire. The same month, Artúr Görgey became the new Commander-in-Chief of all the armies of the independent Hungary.

After the fall of the Hungarian revolution in 1849, Vojvodina became an Austrian Crown Land. In 1860 it became again a Hungarian Crown Land and was part of Hungary until the end of World War I.

==== Western Slovak Uprising ====
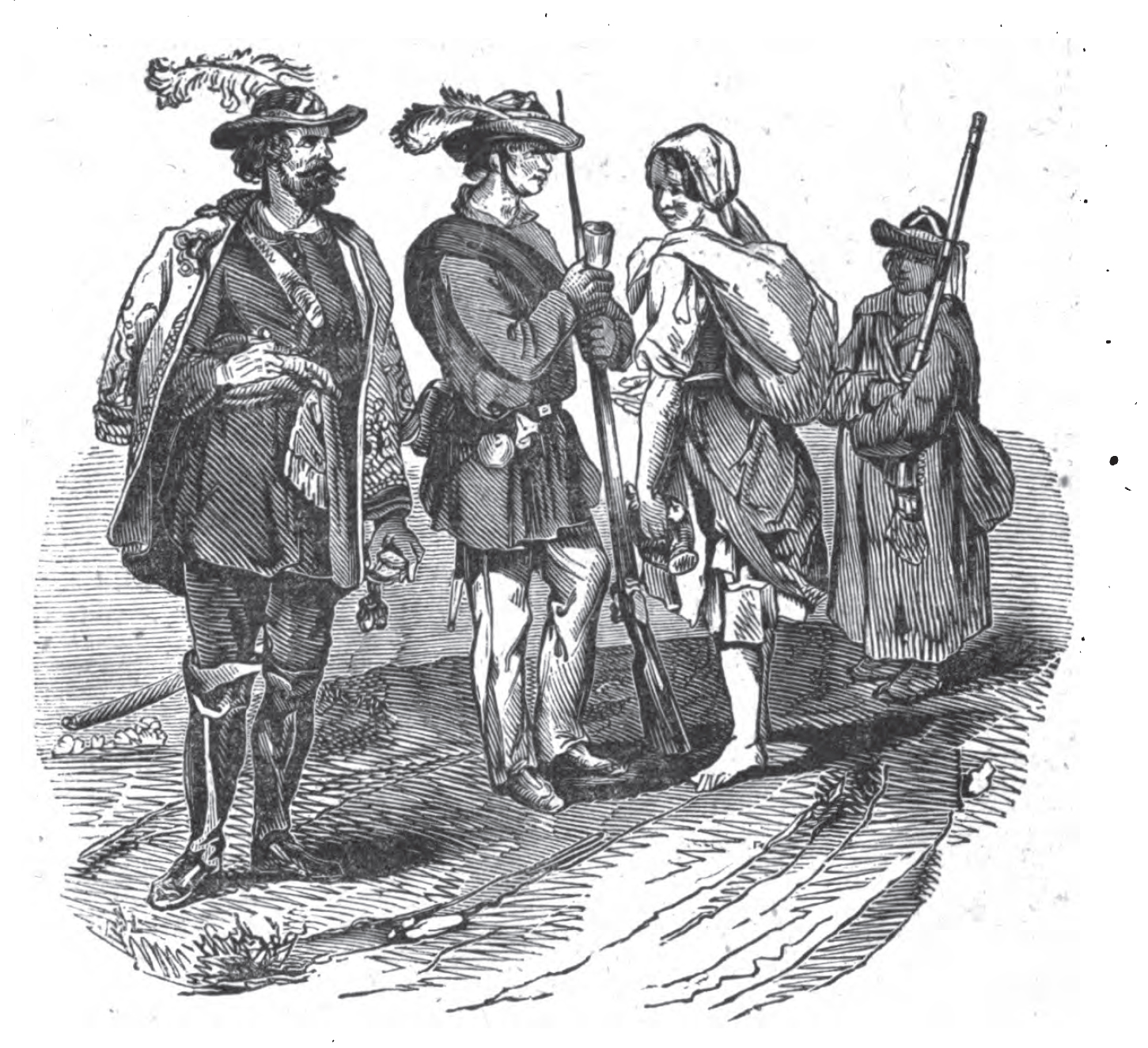
Slovak volunteers, 1848/49

The Slovak volunteers units were a reactionary armed movement opposed to the Hungarian Revolution. Organized in the Western parts of modern Slovakia, the volunteers led multiple campaign across majority Slovak areas in Upper Hungary, all the way to Kassa (Košice) in the east. The leaders of the Slovak Volunteers, Ľudovít Štúr, Jozef Miloslav Hurban and Michal Miloslav Hodža, struggled to elicit total support from the Slovak nation. A number of Slovak peasants were more concerned with the abolition of feudal servitude, and not with wider national goals. Religious differences also played a key role, as the leaders of the Slovak volunteers were predominantly Protestant, which led to difficulties in eliciting support in regions with a catholic Slovak majority. As a result, they could recruit only up to 2,000 people, while a much higher percentage of the Slovak population was serving in the Hungarian Honvédség (Home Guard) among the Hungarian revolutionaries.

The Slovak nation and people had been poorly defined up to this point, as the Slovak people lacked a definitive border or national identity. However, in the years leading up to the revolution, the Hungarians had taken steps to Magyarize the Slovak region under Hungarian control. The aim of this was to bring the varied ethnic groups around Hungary into a common culture. At the outbreak of the Hungarian Revolution this process was seen as more imminent and threatening to ethnic groups, especially multiple Slovak intellectuals. Slovaks made demands that their culture be spared Magyarization and that they be given certain liberties and rights. These demands soon broke out into wider demonstrations clamouring for the rights of ethnic minorities in Hungary. Arrests were made that further enraged the demonstrators and eventually a Pan-Slavic Congress was held in Prague. A document was drafted at this congress and sent to the Hungarian government demanding the rights of the Slovak people. The Hungarians responded by imposing martial law on the Slovak region.

The Imperial government recognized that all across the Empire, ethnic minorities were seeking more autonomy, but it was only Hungary that desired a complete break. They used this by supporting the ethnic national movements against the Hungarian government. Slovak volunteer units were commissioned in Vienna to join campaigns against the Hungarians across the theatre. A Slovak regiment then marched to Miava (today Myjava, Slovakia), where a Slovak council openly seceded from Hungary. Tensions rose as the Hungarian army executed a number of Slovak leaders for high treason and the fighting became more bloody.

However, the leaders of the Slovak Volunteers also wanted its autonomy from Hungary. They hoped that the Slovak lands would become a direct part of the Austrian empire. Tensions caused due to unfulfilled promises from the Austrians soon began to rise. Lacking support and with increased Hungarian efforts, the Slovak volunteer corps had little impact for the rest of the war until the Russians marched in. It was used in 'mopping up' resistance in the wake of the Russian advance and then soon after was disbanded, ending Slovak involvement in the Revolution. The conclusion of the uprising is unclear, as the Slovaks fell back under Imperial authority and lacked any autonomy for some time.

==== Transylvania ====
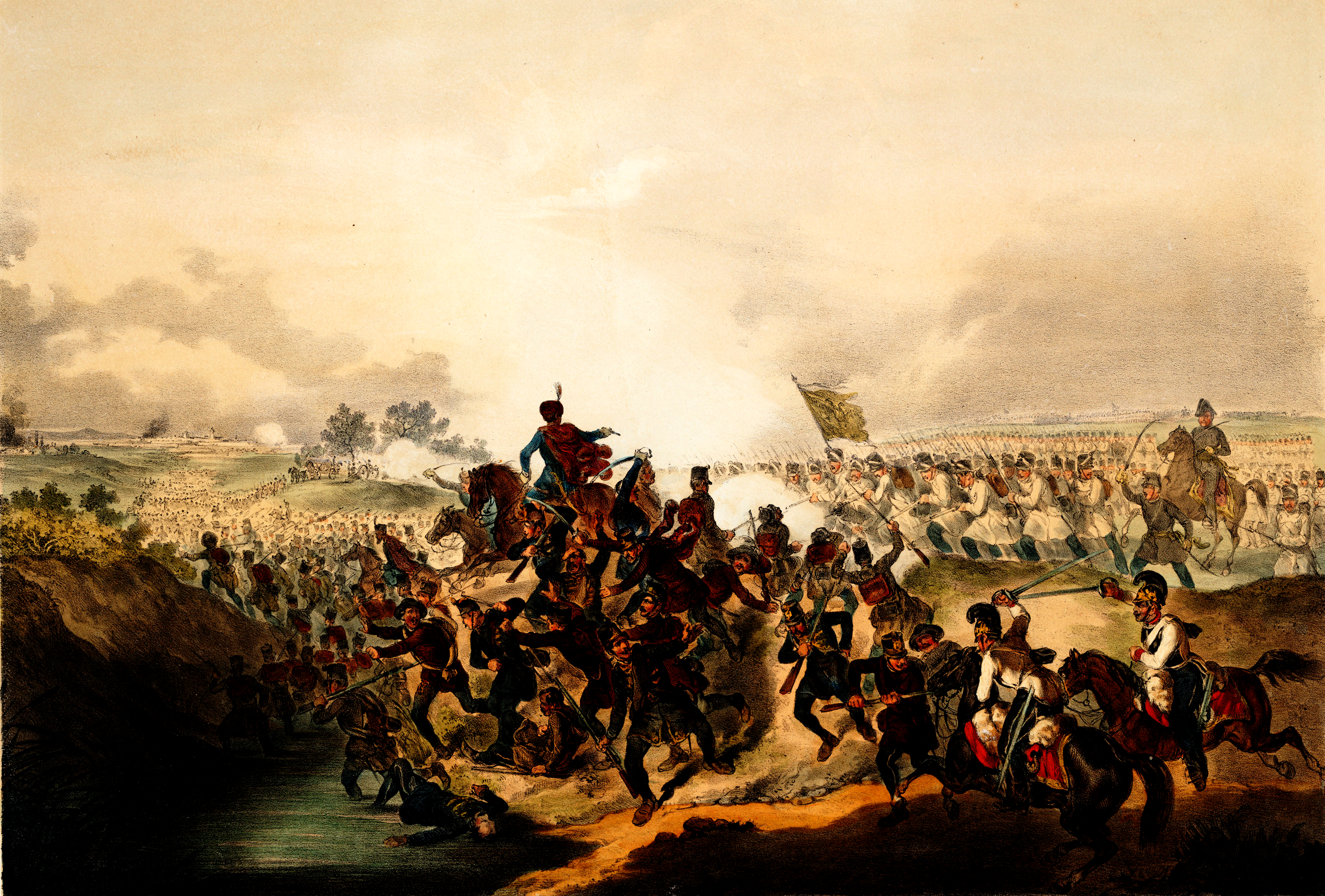
Battle of Temesvár in August 1849

On 29 May 1848, at Kolozsvár (now Cluj, Romania), the Transylvanian Diet (formed of 116 Hungarians, 114 Székelys and 35 Saxons) ratified the re-union with Hungary. Romanians and Germans disagreed with the decision.

On 10 June 1848 the newspaper Wiener Zeitung wrote: In any case, the union of Transylvania, proclaimed against all human rights, is not valid, and the courts of law in the entire world must admit the justness of the Romanian people's protest

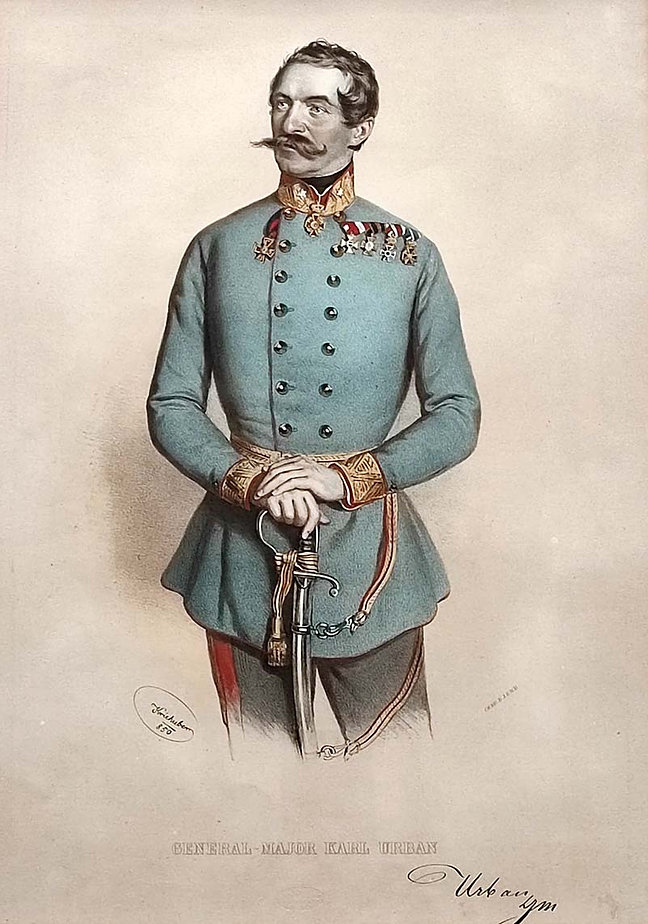
Karl von Urban

In September 1848, the Austrian commander Karl von Urban was the first to make a stand against the Revolution. He summoned leaders of all 44 districts of the Principality of Transylvania to his headquarters in Naszód (Năsăud) on September 10, and offered protection both to villages that rejected conscription and to the landowners who feared a peasant uprising. Urban then administered the oath of allegiance to the hundreds of peasants and village delegate, finally denouncing the Revolution in a Memorandum widely distributed. Von Urban acted in such a compelling manner that, by the end of September, 918 communities in the region had distanced themselves from the Revolution and were won over to the Imperial and Counter-revolutionary cause. This dealt a fatal blow to the power of the revolutionary party in Transylvania.

==== Romanians ====
On 25 February 1849 the representatives of the Romanian population sent to the Habsburg Emperor The Memorandum of the Romanian nation from the Great Principality of Transylvania, Banat, from neighbouring territories to Hungary and Bukovina where they demanded the union of Bukovina, Transylvania and Banat under a government (...) the union of all Romanians in the Austrian state into one single independent nation under the rule of Austria as completing part of the Monarchy.

==== Transylvanian Saxons ====
In the first days of October 1848, Stephan Ludwig Roth considered that there were two options for the Saxons: The first is to side with the Hungarians, and thus turn against the Romanians and the empire; the second is to side with the Romanians, and thus support the empire against the Hungarians. In this choice, the Romanians and Hungarians are incidental factors. The most important principle is that of a united empire, for it guarantees the extension of Austria's proclaimed constitution.

The Transylvanian Saxons rejected the incorporation of Transylvania into Hungary.

==== Attempts of reconciliation with the nationalities ====
As early as August to September 1848, the Hungarian Parliament's Nationality Committee drafted a nationality bill for the Romanians, promising them such wide rights that could meet even today's democratic standards:

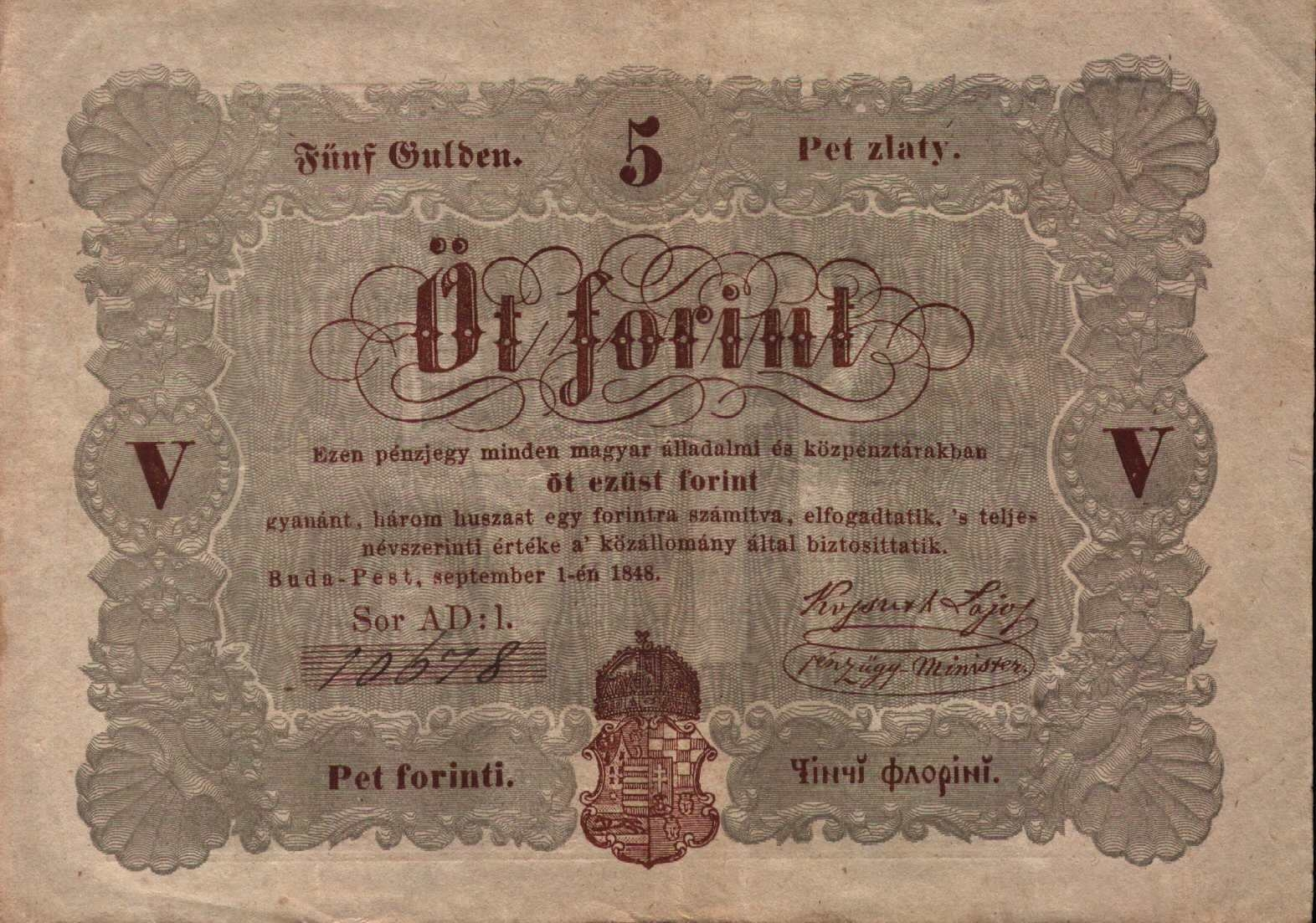
Hungarian money called the "Kossuth bankó" (Kossuth banknote), with inscriptions in Hungarian and the languages of the nationalities on it: German, Slovak, Croatian, and Romanian.

1. Education in the mother tongue. The bill promised that the Romanian tongued population would be taken into account at the establishment of public schools. However, secondary schools with Romanian as the language of teaching would have to teach Hungarian language and literature as an ordinary subject.
2. A department of Romanian philology and literature would be established at the university.
3. Full ecclesiastical equality for the Orthodox Church with the Catholic and Protestant churches,
4. Election of officials according to the national proportion of the place,
5. Official correspondence between the State and districts and municipalities with a Romanian majority may be conducted in Romanian,
6. Romanians may address the State and local authorities in their mother tongue,
7. Representatives elected to city and county councils do not have to understand Hungarian,
8. In ethnic majority areas, the national guards will receive their orders in the ethnic language,
9. All rights granted to one nationality will be extended to all other nationalities.

Despite this effort from the Hungarians, the Romanians sought the fulfillment of their demands from the emperor, which led to a bloody civil war between them and the Hungarians.

== Military organization ==
=== Imperial-Royal Army in Hungary before the Revolution ===
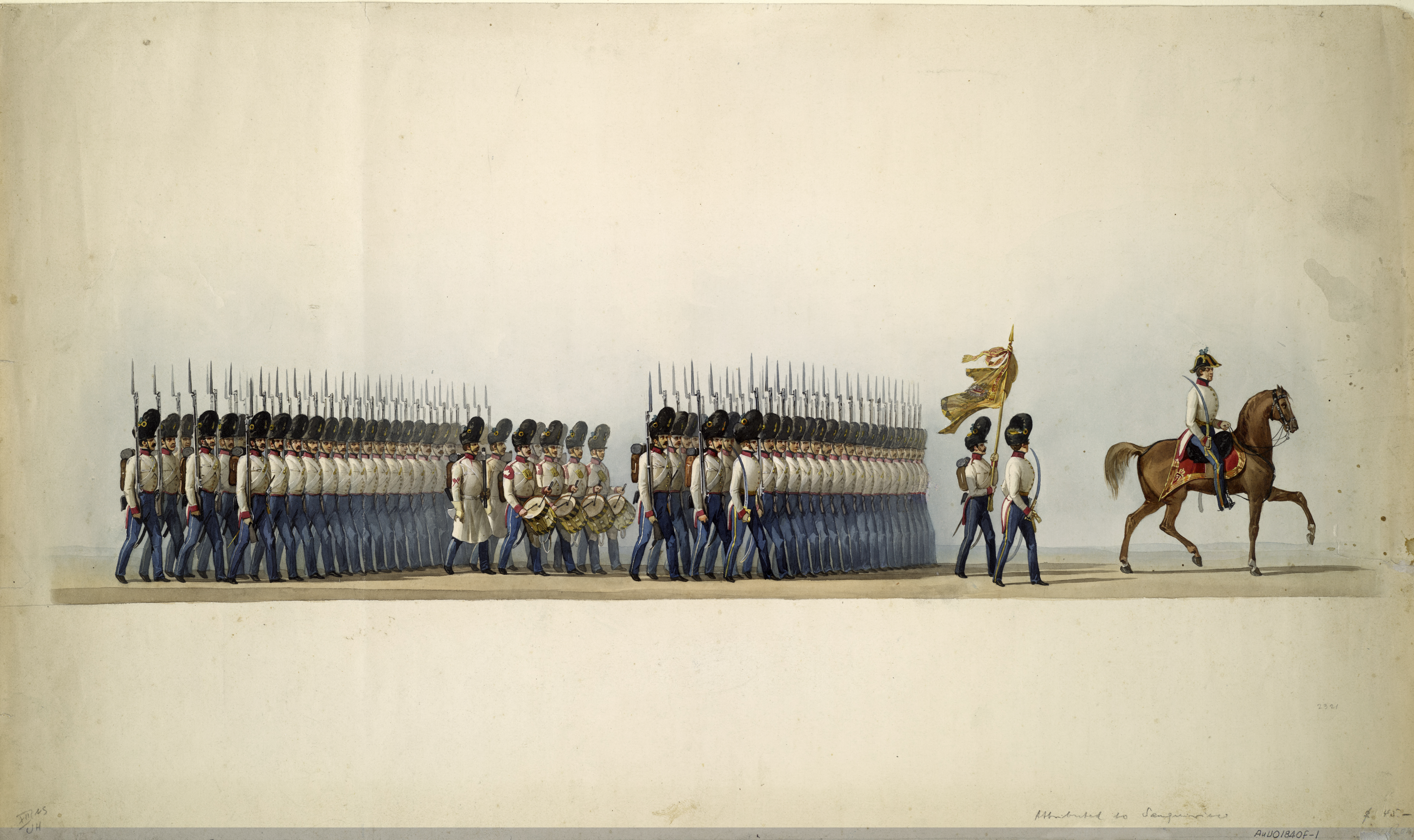
Austrian grenadiers parading (c. 1840)

The Austrian Empire was divided into 12 military headquarters, five of which (Buda, Nagyszeben, Zagreb, Pétervárad, and Temesvár) operated in the Lands of the Hungarian Crown. Hungary had a stronger imperial military presence than other regions, with six divisions, each comprising two brigades.

Pest housed the artillery division HQ, overseeing artillery and wagon logistics for Hungary and Transylvania. In peacetime, the Empire had 58 infantry regiments—13 from Hungary and 2 from Transylvania. The Military Frontier provided 18 border guard regiments, mostly with non-Hungarian soldiers. The cavalry had 37 regiments, including 12 hussar ones, all recruited from Hungary and Transylvania. Engineer and artillery units were staffed from outside Hungary. Recruitment followed strict quotas and 10-year service terms. By early 1848, only a portion of the Hungarian-recruited troops were stationed in Hungary, with a number of them still deployed abroad. Basic combat units included infantry battalions, cavalry regiments, and artillery batteries.

=== Birth of the Hungarian Army after the Revolution ===
Article III of 1848 granted Hungary military authority, though the emperor resisted.

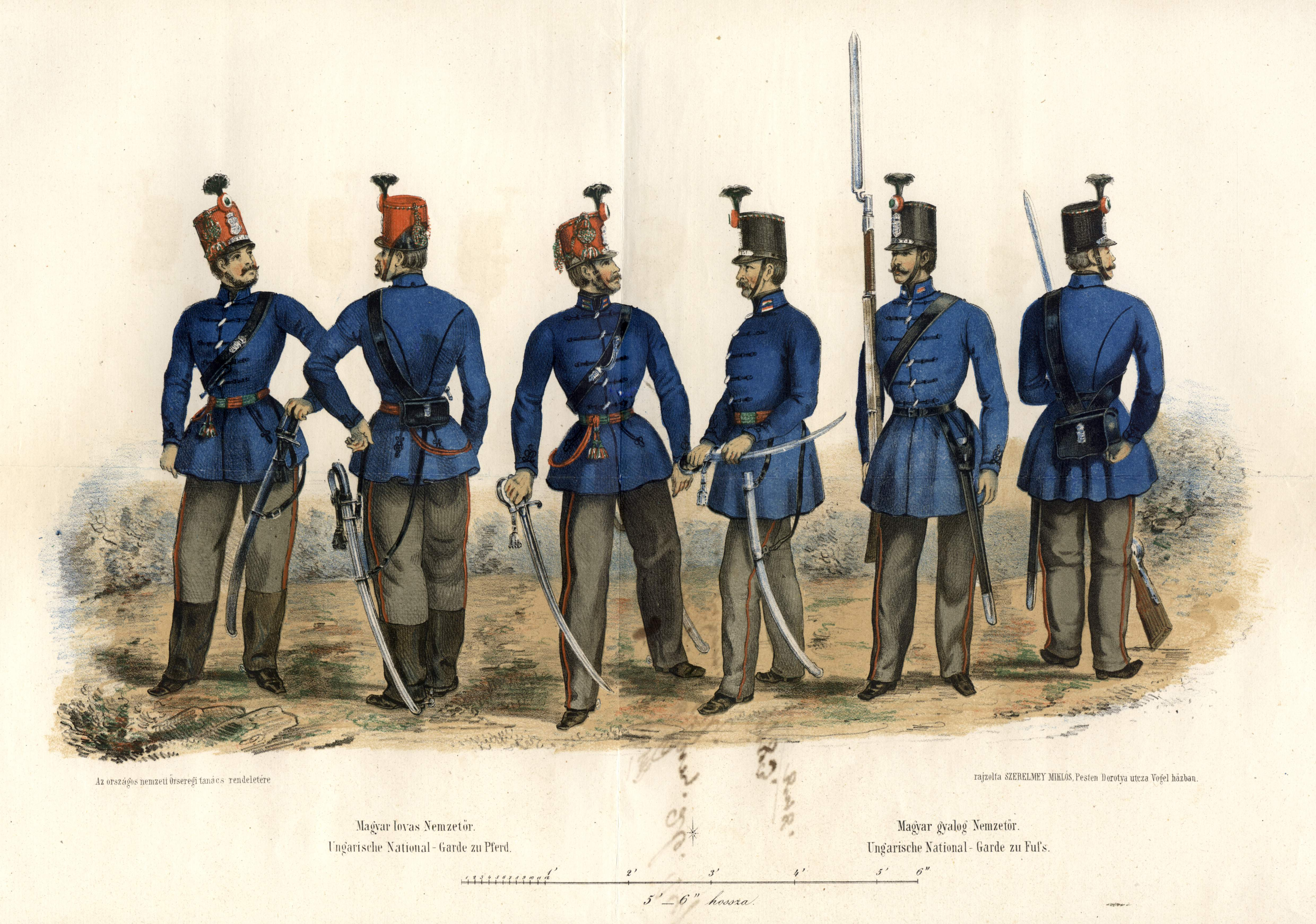
Hungarian National Guard (1848)

After May 7, Hungarian orders became binding, and by June, rights extended to the Military Frontier—due more to the Empire’s internal crises than goodwill.

The National Guard, created under Article XXII, aimed to preserve order but evolved into a defensive force. Initially limited to wealthier citizens, it grew to 55,000–60,000 by mid-April, though poorly armed and trained. With unrest growing—especially from Serb rebels in the south—Hungary needed a reliable force. On April 15, a regular National Guard of 10,000 was formed, organized by Colonel Manó Baldacci. By August, the goal was met, and battalions deployed to the southern front. However, they proved inadequate for long-term field operations. As compulsory mobilization failed, Hungary began forming mobile volunteer units. These were trained in camps (Vác, Pápa, Szolnok, Arad) and joined by some irregular forces. War Minister Lázár Mészáros returned in May to organize the ministry and deploy troops. His efforts to repatriate Hungarian units met resistance from Vienna. Only a few battalions returned, and one was even forced to fight against Hungary. Some hussar regiments returned legally or by desertion. Eventually, the War Ministry commanded 28 Landwehr battalions and 9 hussar regiments, but full recruitment reforms stalled as the Emperor refused to ratify the new law.

== War of Independence ==
=== Serbian revolt (Summer 1848) ===
In spring 1848, Serbian assemblies demanded national recognition and an end to feudalism. Kossuth rejected these, declaring Hungary a single political nation. Serbs formed the Main Committee at Karlóca and began armed resistance, supported by Serbia and Austria. The uprising began on June 12 with the Hungarian attack on Karlóca, but lacking enough forces the Hungarians were forced to retreat. Serb reinforcements soon turned the tide, capturing much of Southern Bánát and Bácska. Negotiations failed. When the Hungarians counterattacked and tried to capture the Serbian stronghold of Szenttamás, it held out despite two sieges. Hungary achieved its first notable victory in the Battle of Perlasz on September 2.

=== Autumn Campaign ===
==== Military organization ====
After the Batthyány government's fall in September, the National Defense Commission (OHB), led by Kossuth, took over.

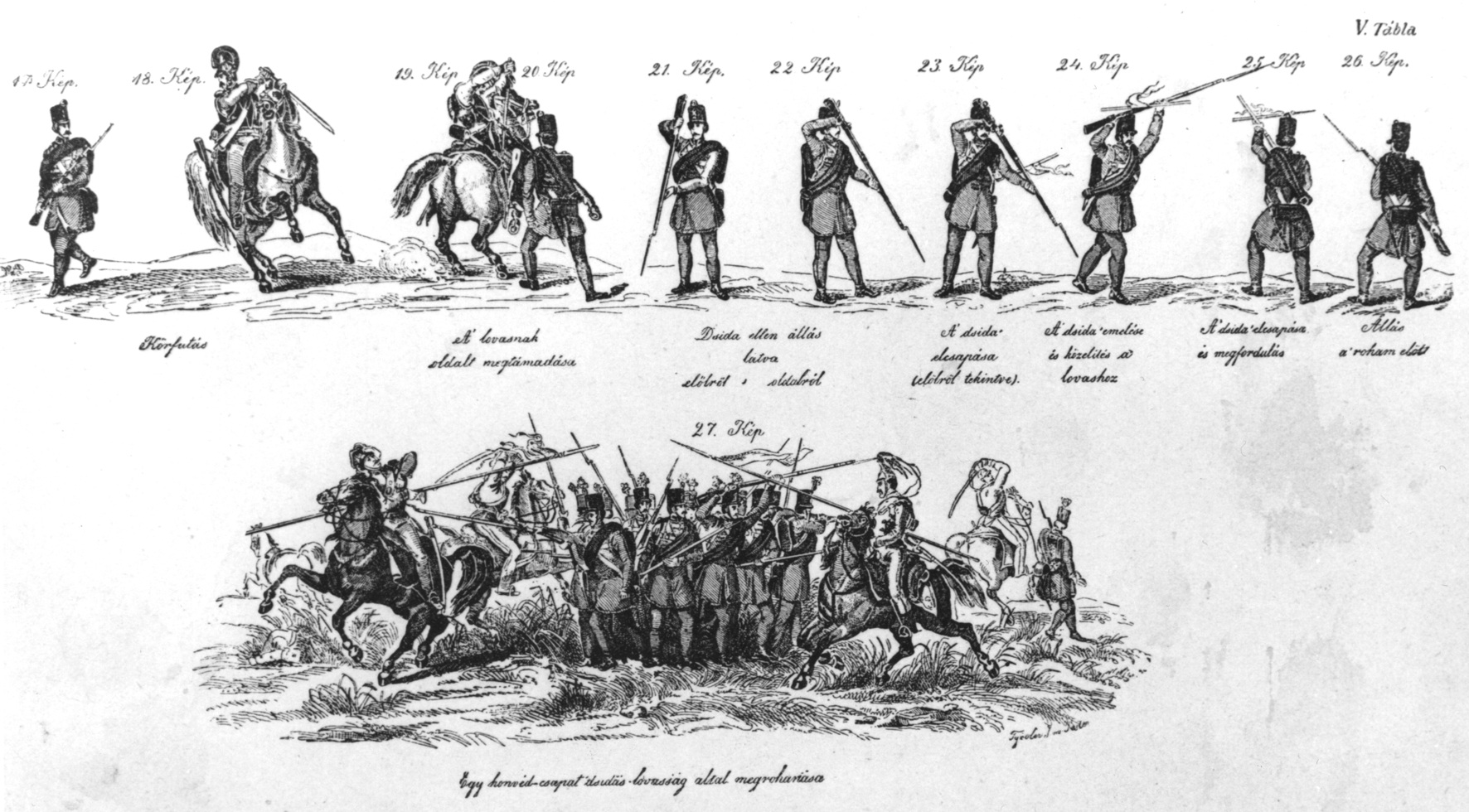
A page from a Hungarian book on infantry fighting from 1848. Sourceː Gracza György: Az 1848-49-iki magyar szabadságharcz története. I-V. (1894-1898), vol III. pp. 175

The War Ministry assumed control, reorganizing into specialized departments and forming eight military districts. Recruitment accelerated; by December, 62 infantry battalions existed, some converted from earlier volunteer units. Foreign legions, notably the Polish, Viennese, German, and Italian, joined the Honvéd Army.

While infantry and cavalry units grew quickly, artillery development lagged due to a lack of tradition. The 5th Artillery Regiment helped initiate it, and by December, over 30 batteries existed, aided by intellectual recruits. Pest began gun production. Military engineering units also formed, starting with the 1st Honvéd Sapper Battalion in November. Due to officer shortages, the OHB promoted former K.u.K. officers and trained civilians. Armament supply was difficult, prompting imports and rapid factory conversions, including the creation of the State Armament Factory. By mid-December, Hungary had a 100,000–110,000-strong army.

In October, Hungary encouraged hussars stationed abroad to return. A number of them deserted Austrian service and returned in small groups, often pursued. Units like the Nádor and Coburg Hussars suffered heavy losses but rejoined the fight, symbolizing national loyalty. Desertions continued into 1849.

==== Operations in the main theater of war ====
On September 11, Ban of Croatia Josip Jelačić invaded Hungary with 50,000 troops. Hungarian forces, led by General János Móga, initially retreated north to Székesfehérvár but repelled Jelačić at the Battle of Pákozd on September 29.

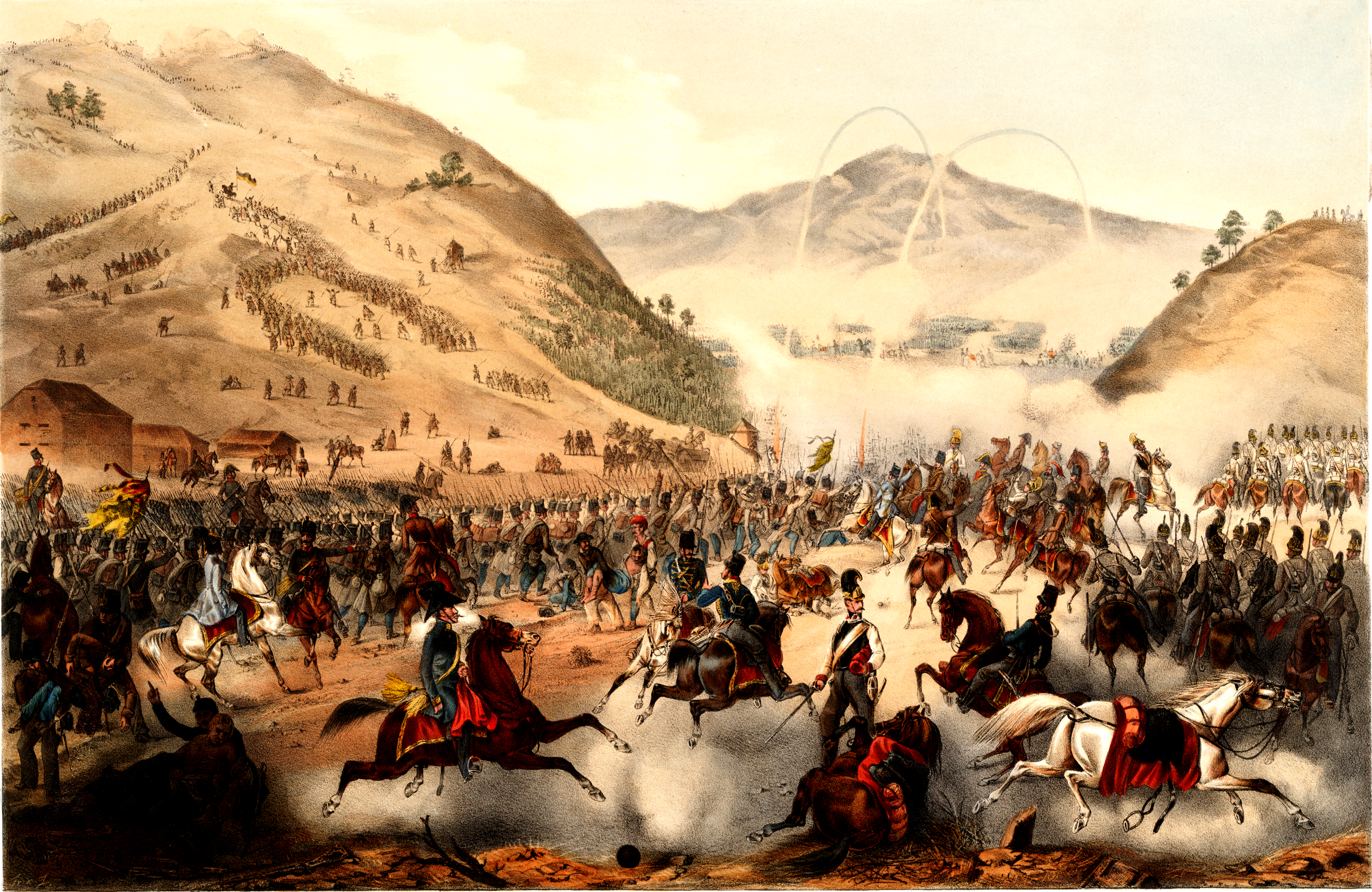
Battle of Pákozd

After a brief truce, Jelačić withdrew. Popular uprisings in Transdanubia disrupted Croatian supply lines, and intercepted messages revealed Austrian backing. On October 7, Hungarian troops and militias led by the Colonels Artúr Görgei and Mór Perczel forced a 9000 strong Croatian corps to Surrender at Ozora.

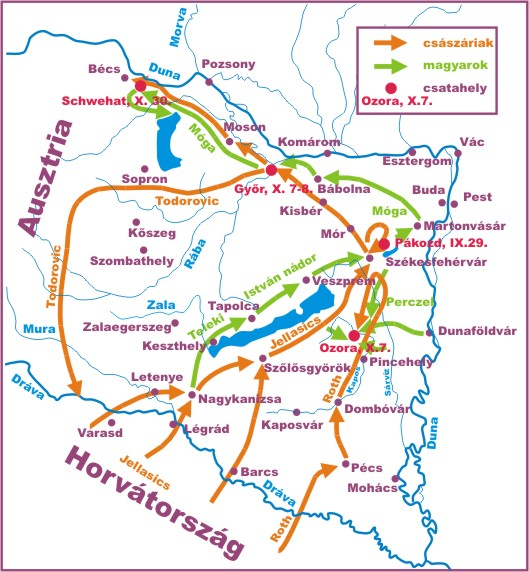
Attack and fleeing towards Vienna of Jelačić

Meanwhile, the Hungarian forces followed Jelačić to the Austrian border. The Vienna Uprising began on October 6, forcing the emperor to flee the city. However, the Hungarian commanders hesitated to intervene and help the rebels against the imperial army, which was led by Field Marshal Alfred I, Prince of Windisch-Grätz. Finally, on October 30, under pressure from Kossuth, they advanced, but were defeated in the Battle of Schwechat the following day.

After the emperor’s October 3 manifesto, fortresses in Transylvania and Banat, including Arad and Temesvár, defected. Hungary retained Komárom and others west of the Tisza River, while the east mostly remained imperial.

==== Operations in Transylvania ====
At their September assembly in Balázsfalva, the Romanians rejected Hungarian rule and adopted the Austrian constitution, deciding to arm themselves.

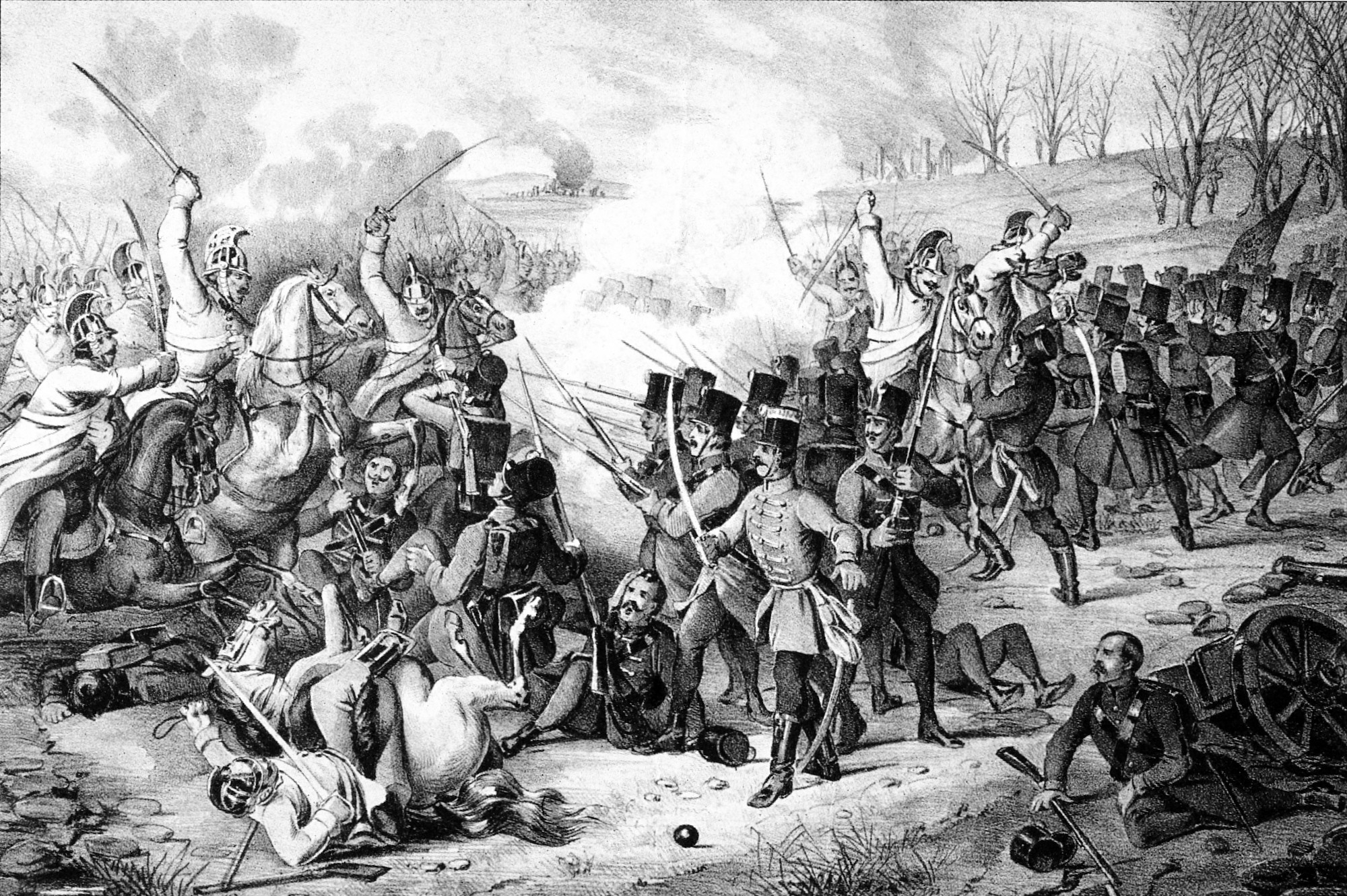
First Battle of Dés - 25.11.1848

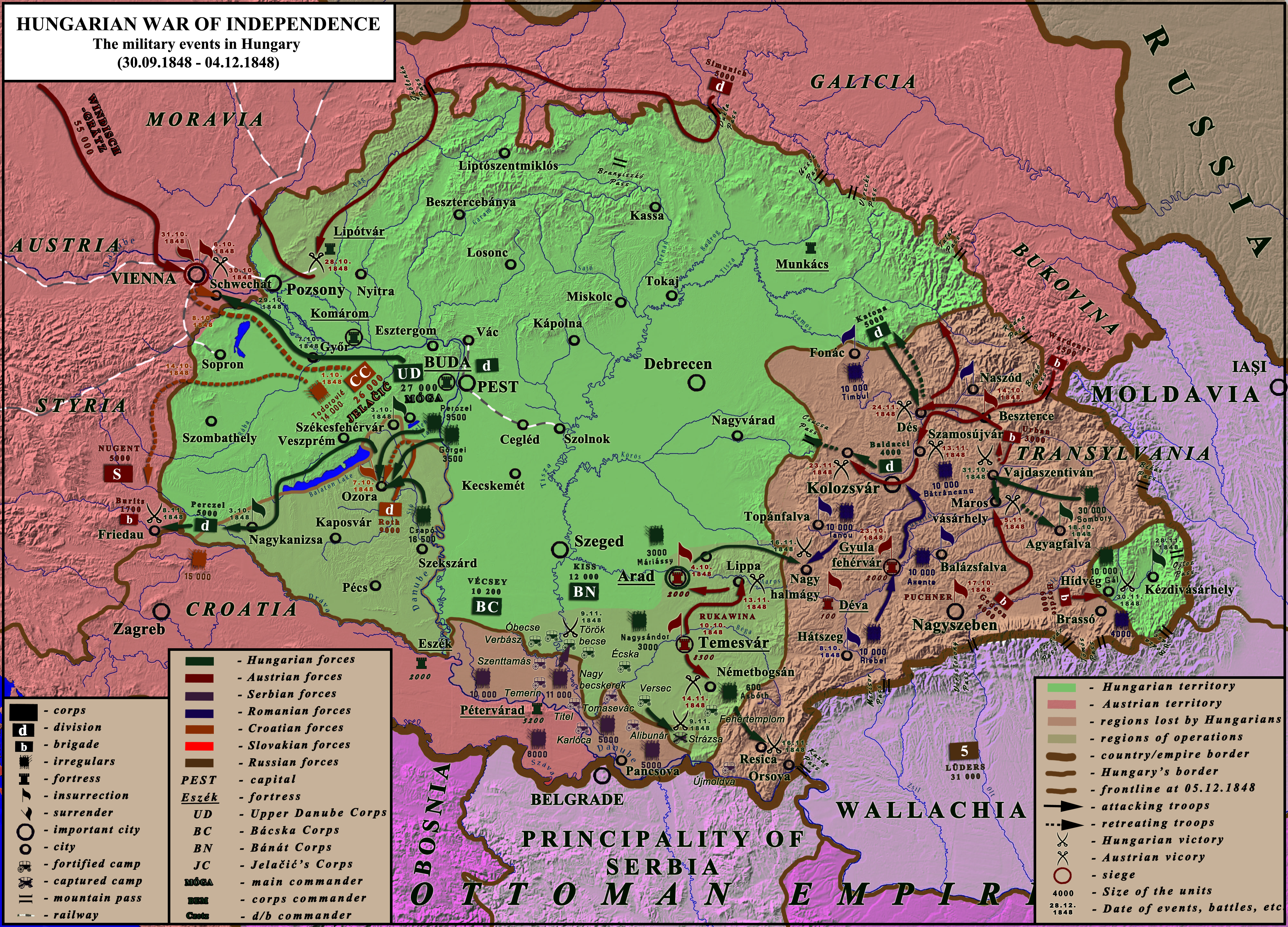
Military situation in Hungary between 30.09.1848-04.12.1848

A rebellion began with covert support from General Anton Puchner, who openly turned against the Hungarian government on 18 October, citing the royal manifesto. Launching his offensive from the Saxon regions of Transylvania, Puchner’s Austrian forces supported by the Romanian insurgents, quickly overwhelmed the Hungarian militias. Thousands of Hungarian civilians were killed in towns such as Zalatna, Gerendkeresztúr, Borosbocsárd, Gyulafehérvár or Kisenyed. The pro-Hungarian Székelys resisted but, after initial successes, they were defeated in the Battle of Marosvásárhely on 5 November, because of a lack of guns. Finally, the last Hungarian forces near Kolozsvár collapsed, and their final effort ended with defeat at the First Battle of Dés on 25 November, placing Transylvania under Austrian control.

==== Operations in southern Hungary ====
After uprisings in Arad and Temesvár, Serbian-Austrian forces grew to 40,000 men and 160 cannons, facing 28,000 Hungarians with 106 cannons. Despite being outnumbered, the Hungarians triumphed in the Battle of Törökbecse–Óbecse–Nagykikinda. Peace talks failed in late November, and no major fighting occurred in Bácska by year’s end.

=== Winter Campaign ===
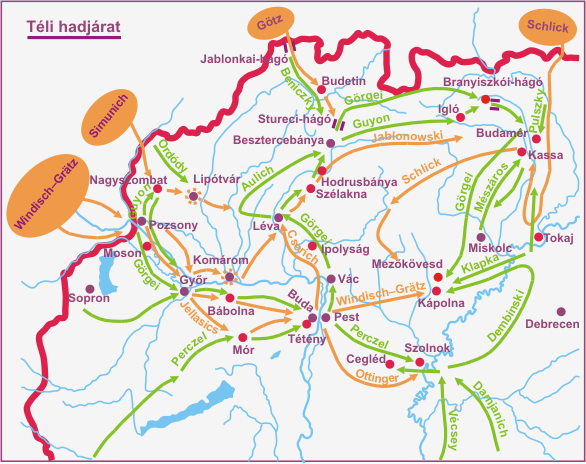
The Habsburg Winter campaign against the Hungarian revolutionary government in 1848-49

==== General situation and balance of power ====
In December 1848, Austria sought to restore absolutism. Ferdinand V was replaced by Franz Joseph I, beginning efforts to revoke Hungary’s autonomy. Field Marshal Windisch-Grätz massed Austrian forces around Vienna, supported by Serbian, Transylvanian, and Croatian troops, totaling nearly 150,000 men and 350 guns. They aimed to seize Pest and Buda. Hungarian forces, led by General Artúr Görgei, held key fortresses like Komárom and Pétervárad. With around 100,000 troops and 300 cannons, Hungary sought to defend its borders and retain gains from the April Laws, despite lacking centralized command.

==== Main theater of war – Western Front ====
On December 14, Austrian forces led by Windisch-Grätz crossed into Hungary.

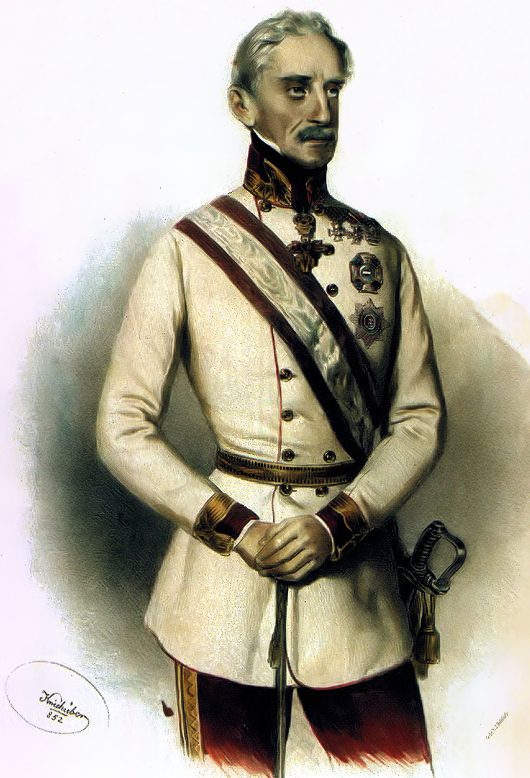
Alfred I, Prince of Windisch-Grätz

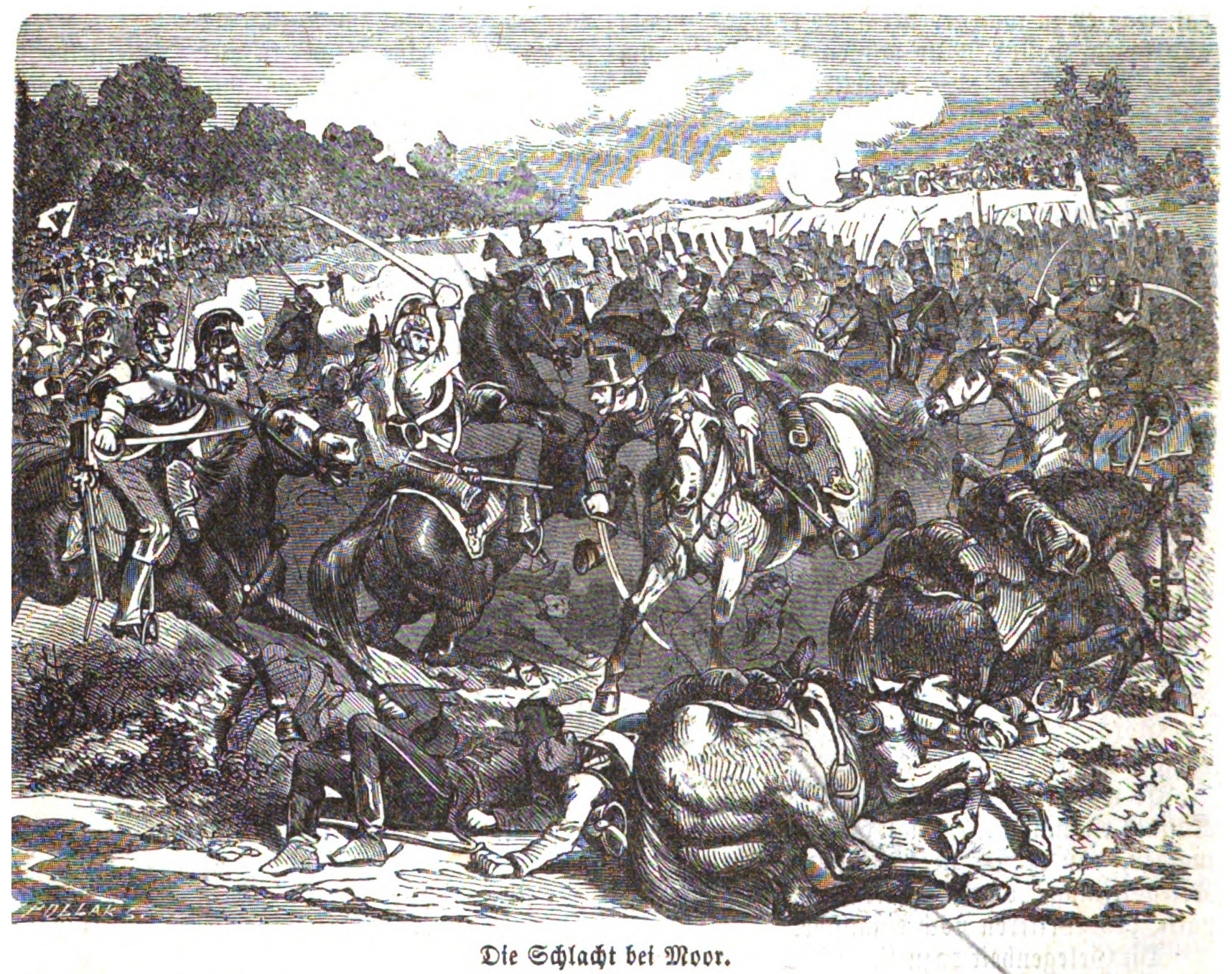
Battle of Mór. Fight between the Hungarian Hussars and Austrian Cuirassiers

After capturing Pozsony and Győr with little resistance, they defeated Perczel at the Battle of Mór (December 30). The Hungarian government evacuated Pest for Debrecen. By early January, the Hungarian army regrouped along the Tisza.

Hungarian forces launched a limited counterattack in January, retaking Szolnok and defeating Austrian units in the Battle of Cegléd. However, they lost fortresses like Lipótvár and Eszék.

Görgei’s corps withdrew through northern Hungary to the east, luring after him important Austrian forces. He delivered a proclamation in Vác urging discipline, which caused political tension with Kossuth. After resting and training recruits, Görgei defeated Austrian forces at the Battle of Branyiszkó (February 5).

==== Austrian invasion of northern Hungary ====
Franz Schlik’s corps entered Hungary in early December, defeating Defense Minister Lázár Mészáros in the Battle of Kassa. Colonel György Klapka later took command and pushed Schlik back in battles at Tarcal, Bodrogkeresztúr, and Tokaj (January 22–31), protecting Debrecen. After his victory at Branyiszkó, Görgei joined Klapka in Kassa on February 10, forcing Schlik to retreat toward Central Hungary.

==== Transylvania ====
By November, most Hungarian forces had left Transylvania, except for the Székelys in Háromszék Seat.

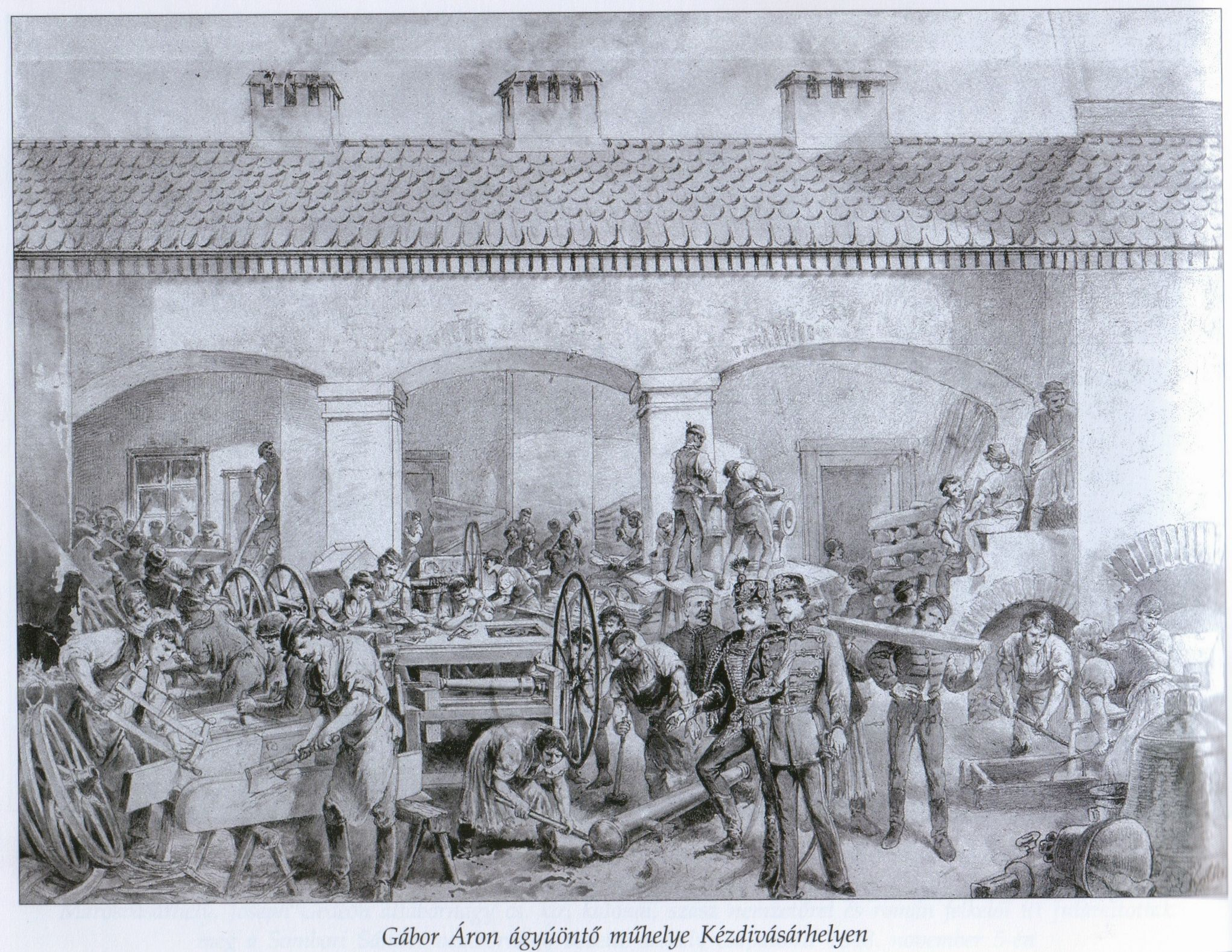
Cannon foundry built by the Székelys from Háromszék, led by Áron Gábor, in Kézdivásárhely

Local leaders, including Áron Gábor, organized resistance, producing cannons and defeating imperial forces in several clashes in December 1848. However, they were defeated at the Battle of Hídvég on December 24.

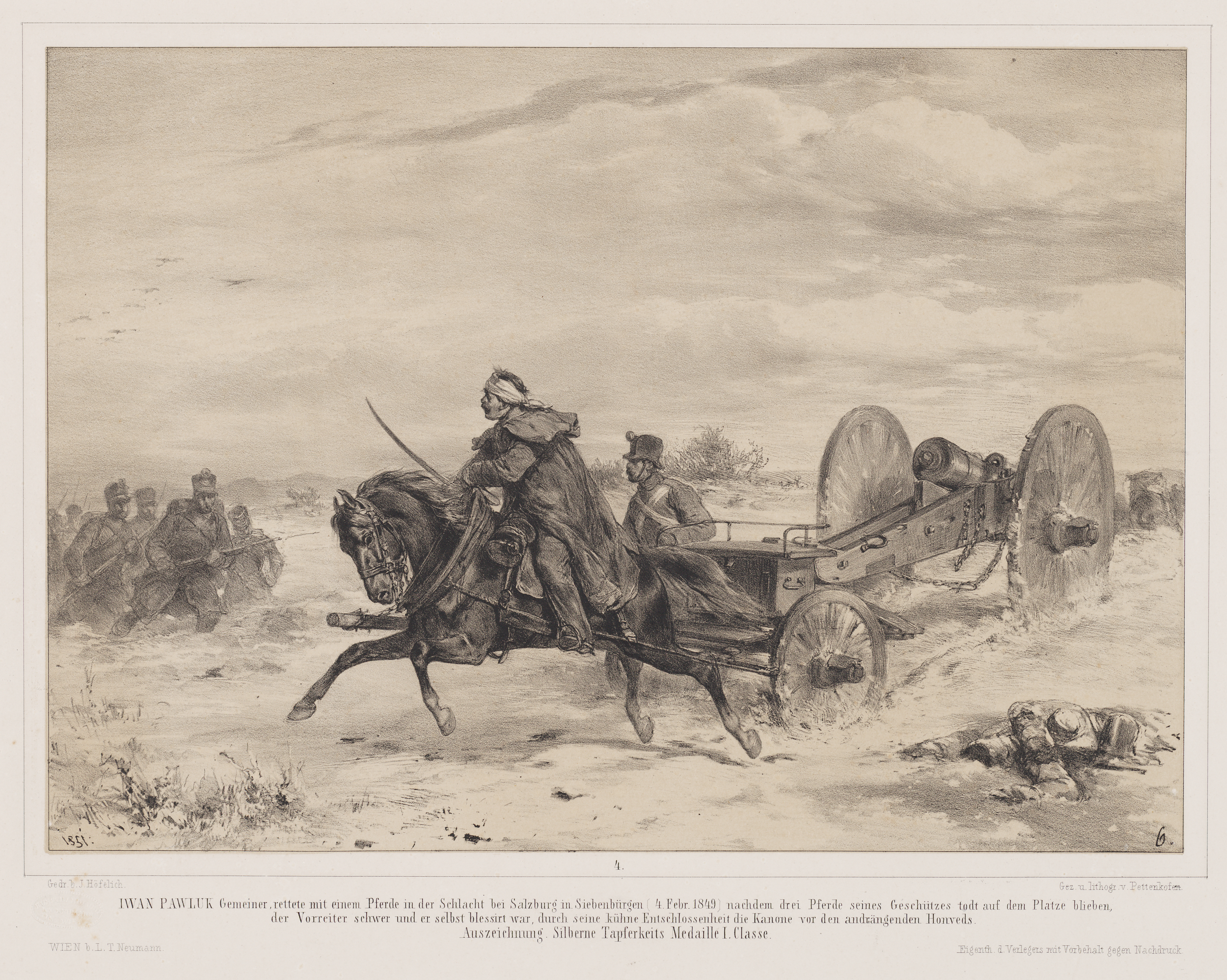
Battle of Vízakna 04.02.1849 - August von Pettenkofen

But the resistance of the small Háromszék diverted important Austrian troops from Western Transylvania, where they were mostly needed.

By December 1848, Austrian General Puchner had taken control of Transylvania, except for Háromszék. Polish General Józef Bem took command and, with 12,500 troops, launched a rapid counteroffensive. After repelling attacks at the mountain passes, he regrouped at Kolozsvár and, with a series of victories, he cleared northern Transylvania by early January. Bem defeated Puchner in the Battle of Szőkefalva (Jan 17) but was repelled in the First Battle of Nagyszeben. After repelling Puchner’s assault at the Battle of Szelindek on January 30, 7,000 Russian troops arrived to support Puchner's troops, and were stationed in the Austrian strongholds of Brassó and Nagyszeben. In his 1883 book about the history of Hungary, Hungarian historian Dierner Endre argues that the initiative to invite Russian troops belonged to the Romanian Orthodox bishop of Transylvania, Andrei Șaguna. This enabled Puchner to attack the diminished Hungarian troops with all his forces. On February 4, Bem suffered a heavy defeat in the Battle of Vízakna. However, he regrouped and defeated Puchner in the Battle of Piski on February 9, which enabled him to start a counter-attack.

==== Retreat from southern Hungary ====
In December, Hungary launched an offensive against Serbian rebels, winning in the Battle of Jarkovác and capturing several camps, but failing to retake Arad. A major defeat in the Battle of Pancsova (Jan 2) led to General Ernő Kiss’s dismissal and Damjanich taking command.

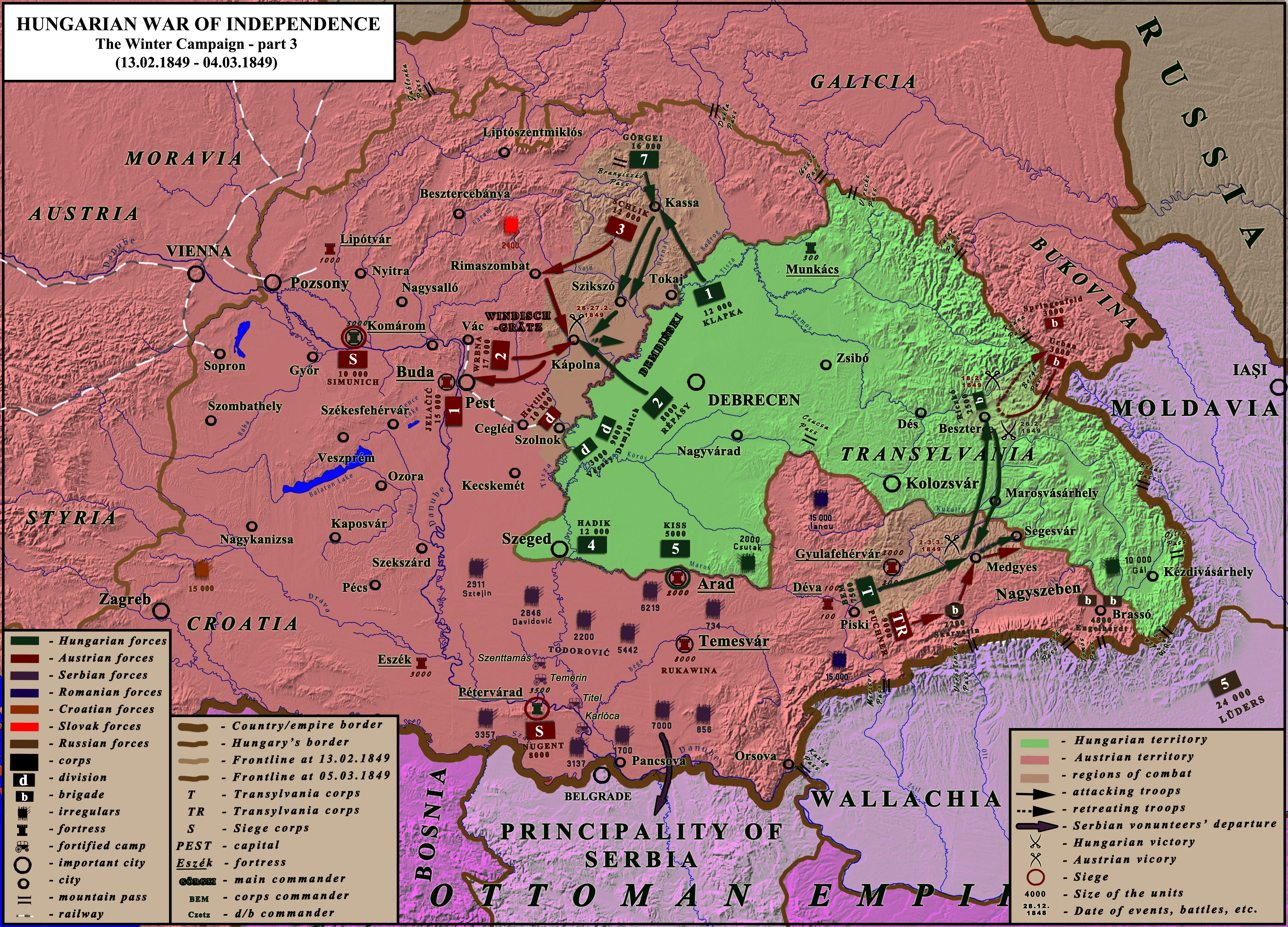
Military situation in Hungary between 13.02.1849-05.03.1849

By mid-January, Hungarian forces retreated north of the Maros River, and imperial troops occupied Bácska, Bánát, and South Transdanubia. In February, Serbs attacked Szeged, but were repelled at the Battle of Újszeged.

==== Hungarian counteroffensive under Dembiński ====
Kossuth appointed Henryk Dembiński as commander-in-chief on January 29. Meanwhile, Windisch-Grätz pushed toward Debrecen. The two armies clashed at the Battle of Kápolna (February 26–27), after which the Hungarian troops, despite being defeated, maintained fighting capacity. A day after Kápolna, in the Battle of Mezőkövesd, the Hungarians repelled the pursuing Austrian cavalry, and on March 5, the troops of János Damjanich and Károly Vécsey won the Second Battle of Szolnok, shattering Windisch-Grätz's hopes in a quick final victory.

On March 3, Hungarian officers rebelled against Dembiński’s leadership. Kossuth replaced him with Görgei temporarily, then appointed Antal Vetter. Vetter chose a new counterattack plan combining movements across Cibakháza and Tiszafüred.

=== Spring Campaign ===
==== Situation ====
By late March 1849, the I, II, III, and VII Hungarian corps—around 50,000 men and 200 cannons—crossed the Tisza and prepared to strike the Austrians from multiple directions. Görgei aimed to surround and defeat the enemy near Gödöllő. Overall, Hungary had 101,000 soldiers and 624 guns. Windisch-Grätz, unaware of Hungarian movements, abandoned the Debrecen offensive and concentrated forces around Pest—55,000 troops and 220 cannons. Additional Austrian and allied forces (for example, the Russian troops in Transylvania) were stationed in Transylvania and southern Hungary, totaling 115,000 troops, without counting the tens of thousands of Romanian militias.

==== Liberation of Transylvania and Bácska ====
After his victory at Piski, Bem repelled an Austrian invasion from Bukovina, but he lost against Puchner in the Battle of Medgyes.

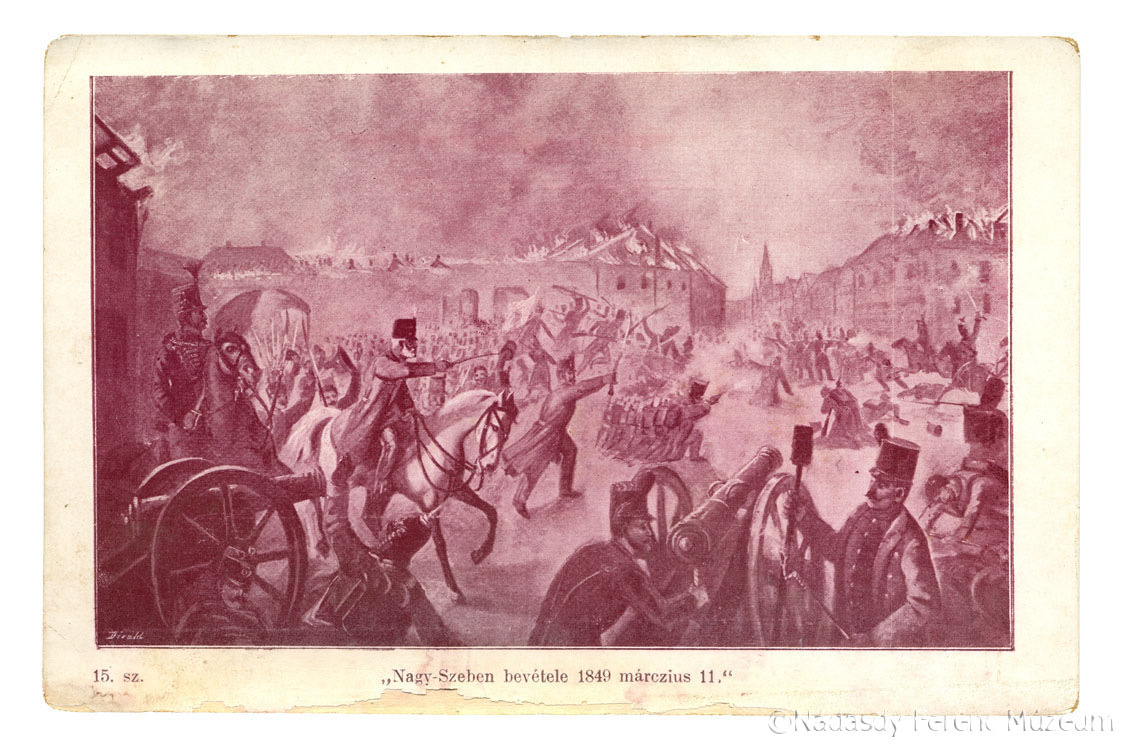
Second Battle of Nagyszeben

However, on March 11, he defeated the Russian and Austrian troops in the Second Battle of Nagyszeben. This victory resulted the total retreat of the Austrian and Russian troops from Transylvania. Only the fortresses of Gyulafehérvár and Déva remained in Austrian hands, while the West Transylvanian Mountains became the last stronghold of the Romanians led by Avram Iancu.

Hungarian forces under Colonel Hadik and later General Perczel fought on the southern front. On March 5, the Hungarians repelled a Serbian attack in the Battle of Kaponya. Perczel formed the IV Corps and lifted the siege of Pétervárad. Then, as a result of the Fourth Siege of Szenttamás, he captured the stronghold, but failed to take the Titel Plateau.

==== Main army campaign ====
Following Vetter's failed counterattack attempt on March 16 due to unfavorable weather conditions, General Artúr Görgei was appointed temporary chief commander.

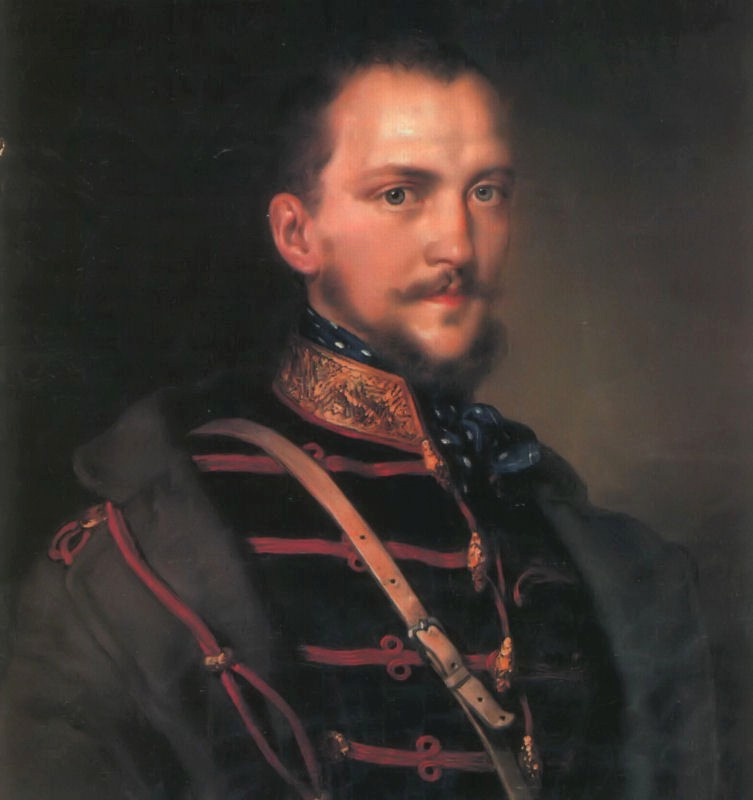
Artúr Görgei

The main offensive began April 1. On April 2, Hungarians defeated Schlik in the Battle of Hatvan, followed by another success in the Battle of Tápióbicske on April 4.

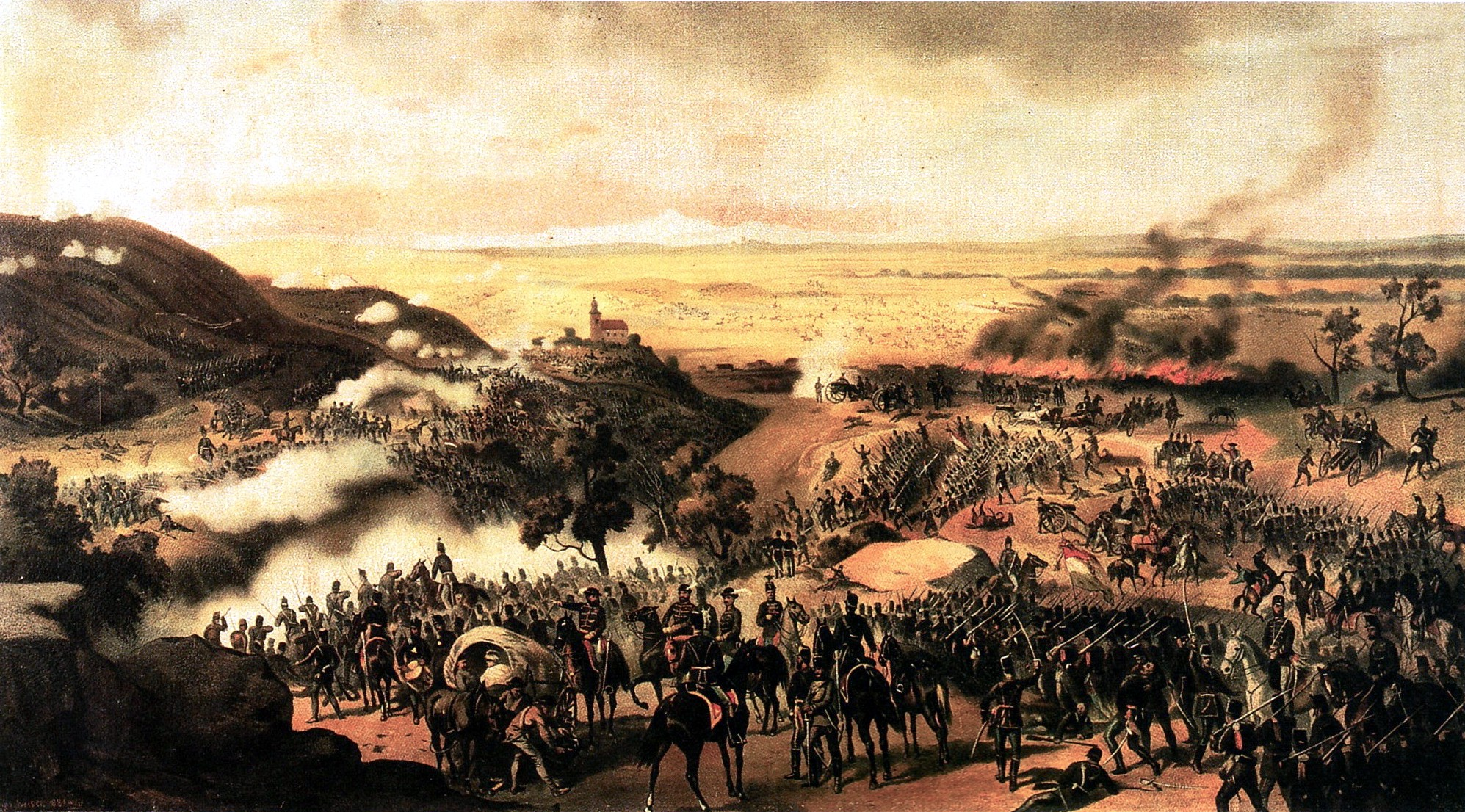
Battle of Isaszeg (oil painting)

On April 6 in the Battle of Isaszeg, Görgei defeated Windisch-Grätz himself, pushing the Austrians toward Pest, gaining control of the Danube–Tisza Interfluve.

After Isaszeg, the Hungarian army moved north to relieve Komárom. On April 10, they defeated the Austrians in the First Battle of Vác, and on April 19, routed the fresh troops coming from Austria in the Battle of Nagysalló. Because of this series of defeats, Windisch-Grätz was replaced by Welden, who ordered the evacuation of the capital. On April 26, the Hungarians lifted the siege of Komárom, driving Austrian forces westward.

On April 14, Hungary declared independence and dethroned the Habsburgs. Kossuth became governor, but the move caused resignations among generals. Görgei stayed on as commander; others like Damjanich, Klapka, and Ernő Poeltenberg took over key corps.

Following Komárom’s relief, Görgei targeted Buda Castle. Beginning May 4, Hungarian troops began the siege. Despite initial expectations, strong defenses and poor artillery delayed success. After heavy bombardment and technical preparations, the final assault on May 21 succeeded, returning the capital to Hungarian control.

==== Operations on other fronts in April and May ====
After General Bem’s victories, Romanian insurgents under Avram Iancu retreated to the Western Carpathians but remained a threat with 70,000 armed men.

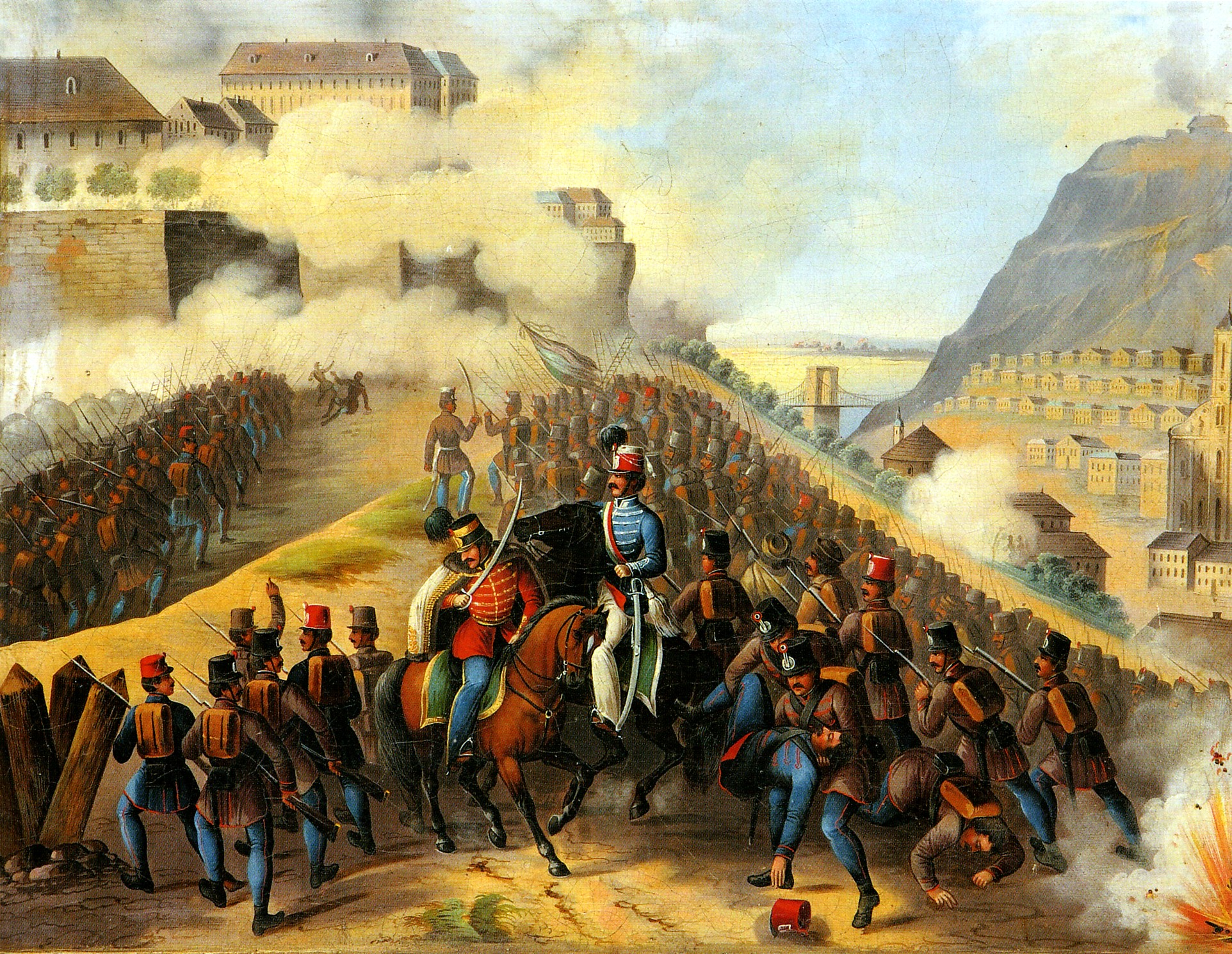
Siege of Buda

Peace talks failed when a Hungarian guerilla leader, Imre Hatvani, with around 1000 men, entered Abrudbánya on 6 May, leading to Hatvani’s retreat. Between May 16–19, Hatvani repeated his attack, but with the same results. The Romanians took revenge of these attacks, by massacring 5,000 Hungarian civilians. On 30 May, when Avram Iancu tried to attack the Hungarian forces besieging Gyulafehérvár, he was repelled.

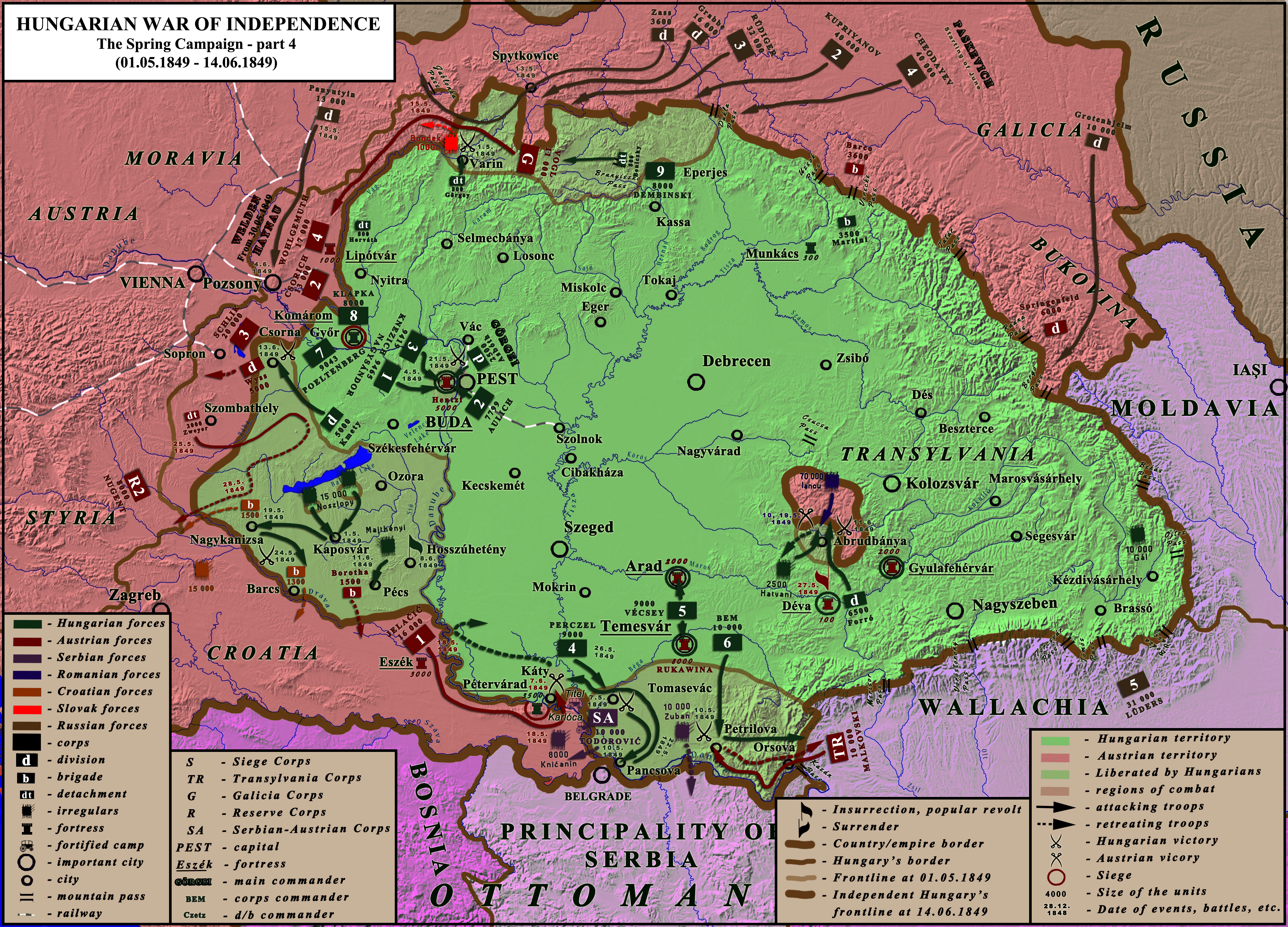
Military situation in Hungary between 01.05.1849-14.06.1849

In May, Bem and Perczel expelled Serbian and Austrian troops under General Malkowski from Bánát. The V Corps laid siege to Arad and Temesvár, but lacked resources for a full assault. Despite this, Hungarian forces pushed Austrians and Serbs back to Syrmia, securing most of Bács and Bánát, excluding Arad and Temesvár.

On 24 March, Colonel Lajos Beniczky surprised the Austrians in the Raid on Losonc, causing a retreat and distracting Windisch-Grätz, which aided Görgei’s offensive. In April, Beniczky and Major Ármin Görgey captured towns across Upper Hungary. In the northeast, a Hungarian victory in the Battle of Podhering on 22 April stopped Austrian raids from Galicia.

In Southern Transdanubia, Gáspár Noszlopy led a popular uprising starting on 19 April. With growing national support, he liberated Kaposvár by 1 May, achieved victories like the Battle of Barcs, and expelled Austrian and Croatian troops from Nagykanizsa. He organized new military units and produced cannons. By late May, most of the region was in Hungarian hands, except Baranya County.

==== Results of the Spring Campaign ====
By early March, Hungary controlled only eastern regions. By 14 June, nearly the entire country was liberated, except for Croatia, Syrmia, the Central Transylvanian Mountains, and a few fortresses. The territory under Hungarian control grew from 95,000 to 250,000 km²—an impressive achievement against Europe’s second-largest empire.

=== Summer Campaign ===
==== Austria seeks Russian help ====
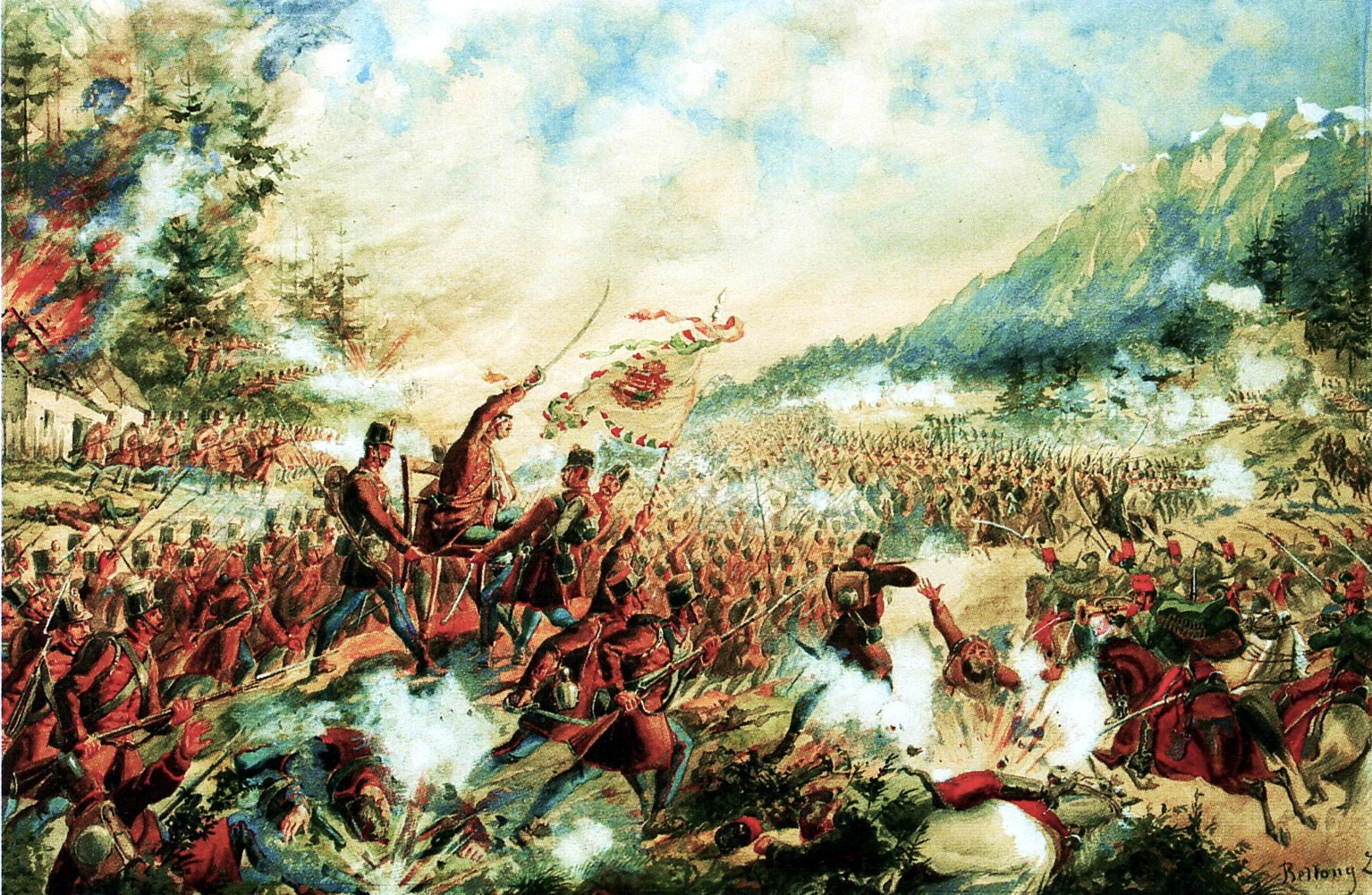
Russian troops breaking into Transylvania through the Tömös Pass on 20 June 1849, while the Székely detachment tries to defend it at all costs, their commander, Sándor Kiss being wounded, but still giving orders from a chair (László Bellony)

Due to Hungary’s growing success, Austria sought help from Russia, resulting in the Treaty of Warsaw. Tsar Nicholas I of Russia sent about 200,000 troops under Field Marshal Ivan Paskevich to Hungary. Simultaneously, Austria appointed Field Marshal Julius Jacob von Haynau as commander of 180,000 Austrian troops and 605 guns, along with Jelačić’s Southern Army and Eduard Clam-Gallas’s Transylvanian Corps. They were aided by 70,000 Romanian militias under Avram Iancu. Their goal was to quickly take Pest: Austrians advanced via Győr-Komárom, and Russians via Kassa-Miskolc. Transylvania would be attacked jointly, while Jelačić acted independently. Hungarian forces had been reorganized after Buda’s liberation. Görgei commanded the main army with 4 corps, supported by garrisons and reserve forces in Szeged. Altogether, the Hungarian army had around 160,000 men and 450 guns, facing a vastly superior enemy of 380,000 troops and 1,205 guns.

==== Battles between the armies ====
Görgei launched a preemptive attack, leading to battles at Szered, Csorna, and Zsigárd. In the Battle of Pered (June 20–21), initial Hungarian success was reversed by disorganized coordination and Russian reinforcements.

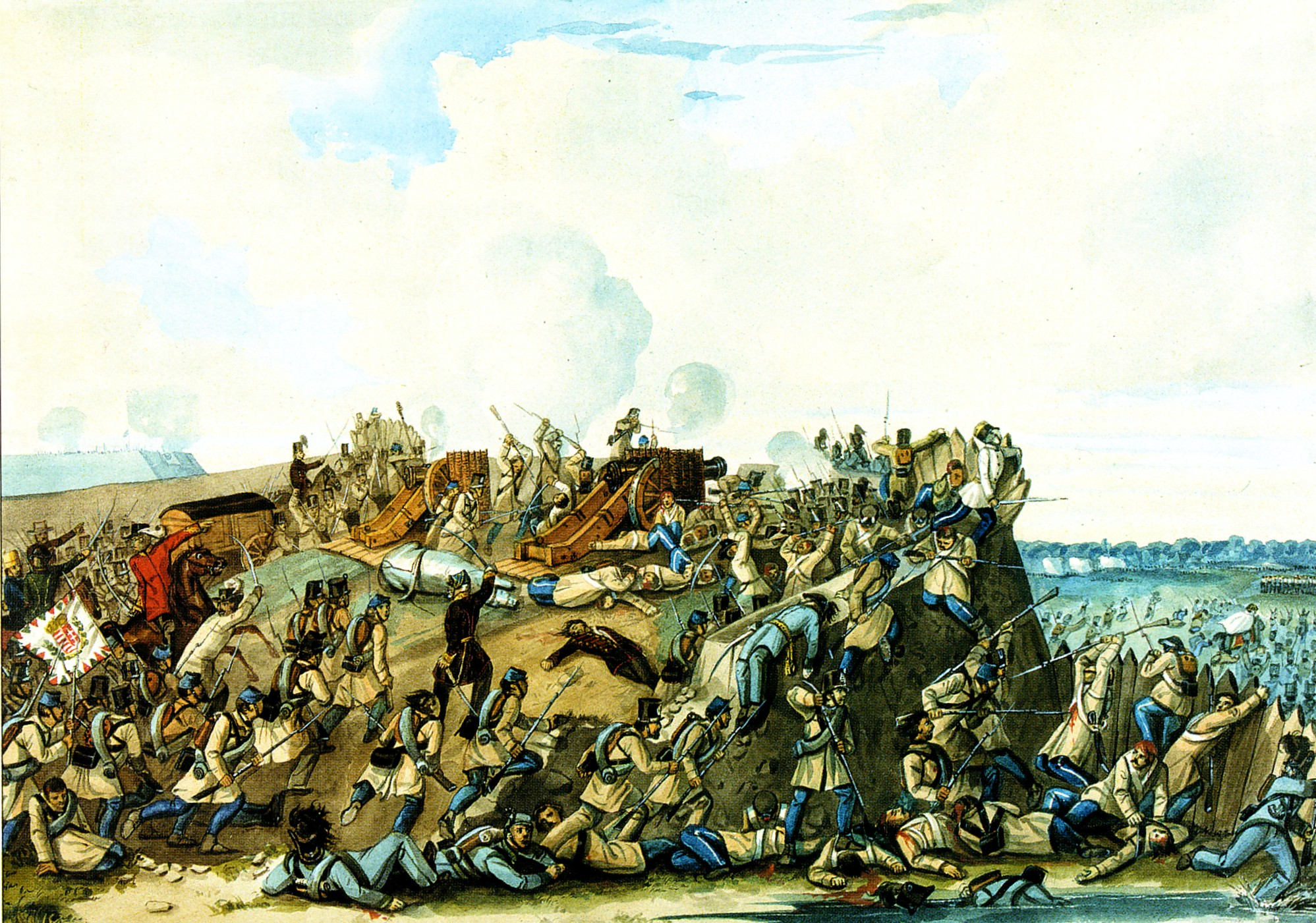
Mór Than: Second Battle of Komárom (July 2, 1849)

Haynau then defeated Poeltenberg in the Battle of Győr (June 28), and Kmety in the Battle of Ihász. Görgei’s smaller army halted Haynau in the Second Battle of Komárom (July 2), but Görgei was wounded and absent from the failed Third Battle of Komárom (July 11), which aimed to open a path to southern Hungary.

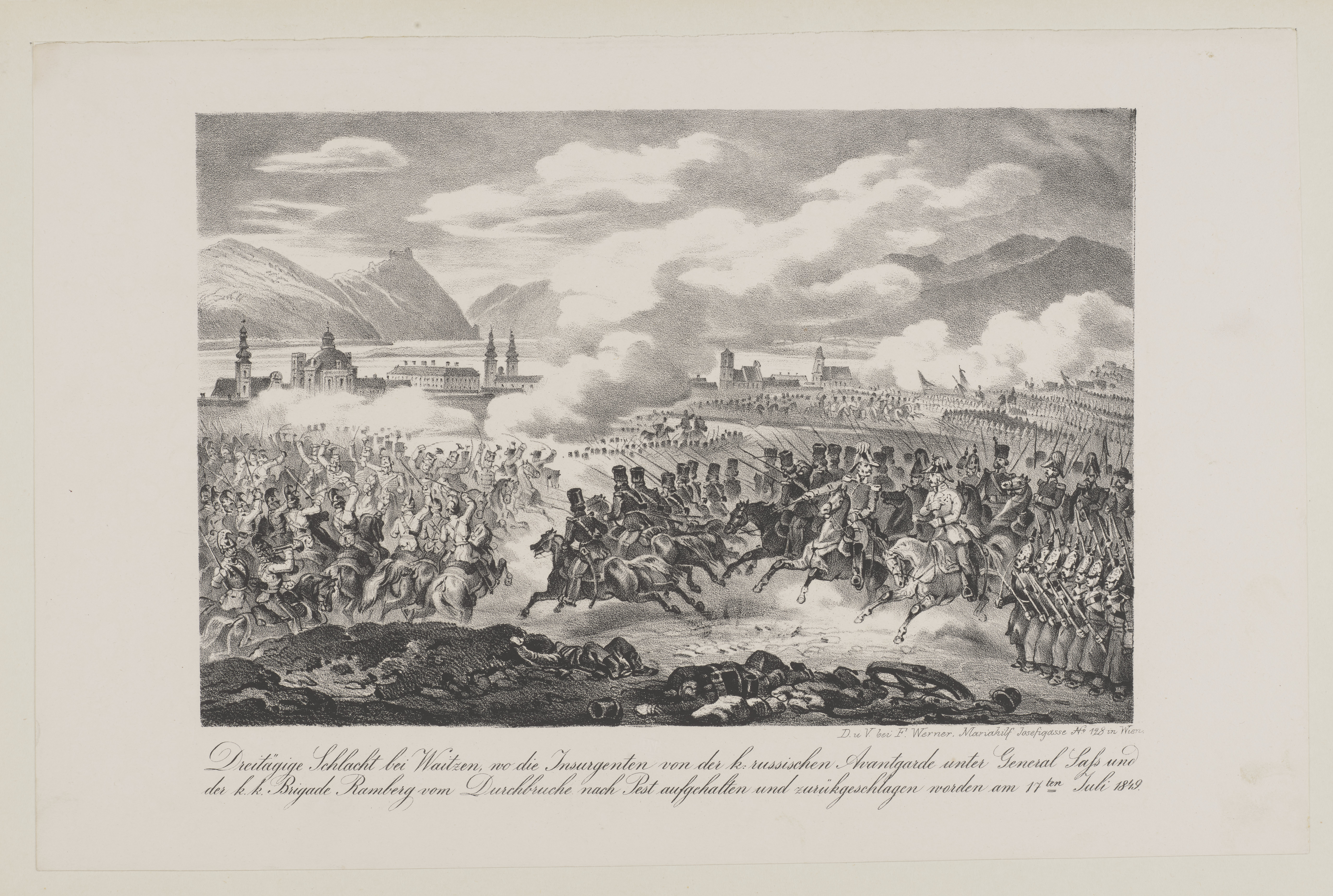
The second battle of Vác 15–17 July 1849

Disputes resurfaced between Kossuth and Görgei, especially over the Declaration of Independence. Görgei blamed it for the Russian invasion and even contemplated reversing it. On June 26, Görgei proposed the concentration of troops at Komárom and defeating Haynau there before the arrival of the Russians. However, the government ordered a concentration at Szeged without informing him. Believing Görgei had disobeyed him, Kossuth dismissed him from command of the troops. However, the Hungarian officers opposed this decision, forcing Kossuth to allow Görgei to continue commanding the Army of the Upper Danube until they reached Szeged.

After the Komárom breakthrough failed, Görgei marched east to avoid Russian control. Clashing with Paskevich in the Second Battle of Vác (July 15–17), Görgei maneuvered behind Russian lines, forcing Paskevich to abandon his southern advance. Winning smaller battles (e.g., the Battle of Gesztely), Görgei reached Arad by August 9—days ahead of the Russians—creating a chance to unite with southern forces.

==== Fights in Transylvania and southern Hungary ====
In June, Russian and Austrian forces invaded Transylvania.

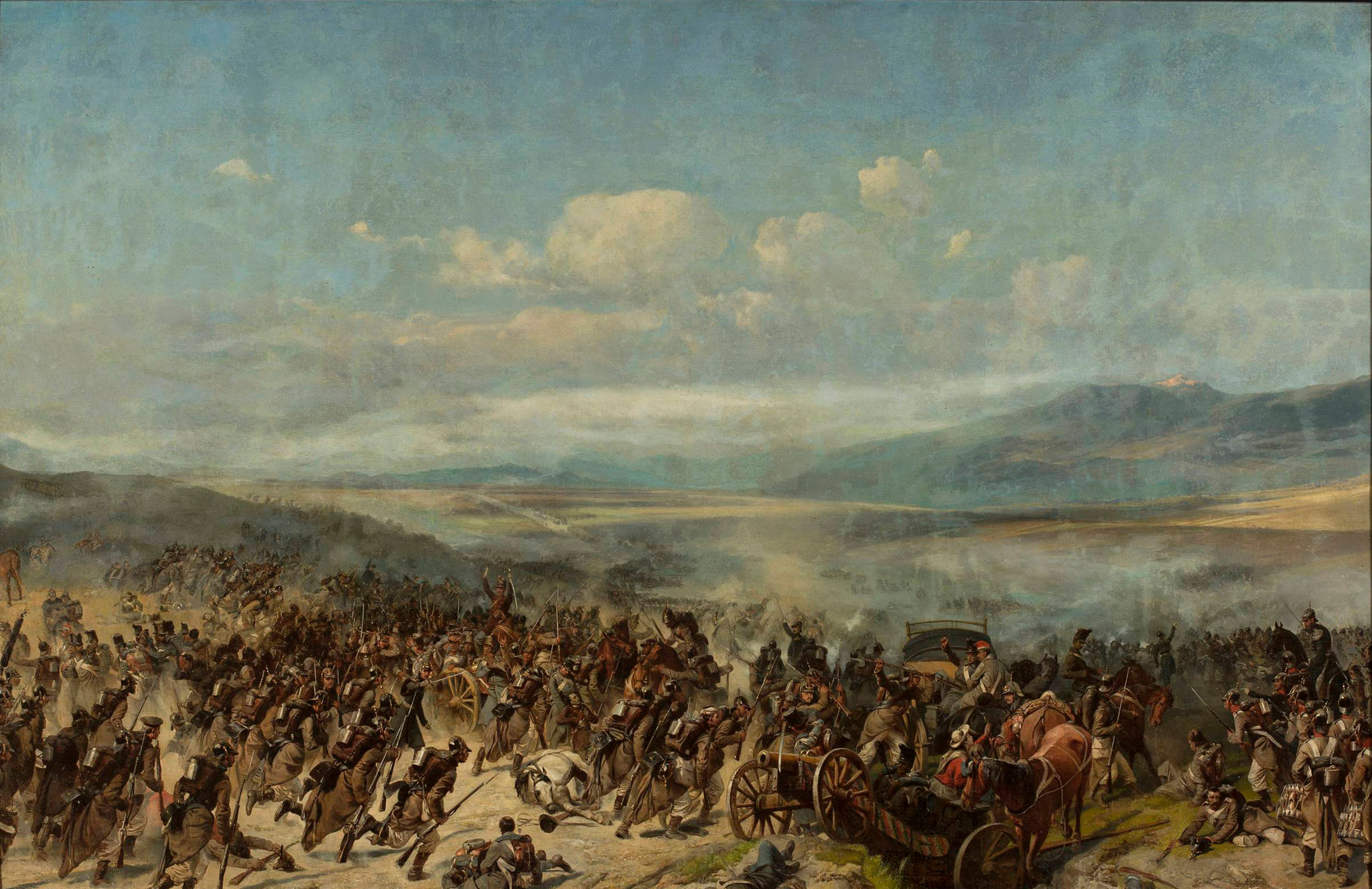
Battle of Segesvár

The Russians took Brassó and Nagybánya, while Clam-Gallas attempted a southern link-up. Bem, shifting forces south, drove out Clam-Gallas but lost to the Russian General Alexander von Lüders in the Battle of Segesvár (July 31), where the Hungarian national poet Sándor Petőfi died. Bem briefly rallied with a win in the Third Battle of Nagyszeben (Aug 5) but his last hopes to keep Transylvania were shattered by the Russians in the Battle of Nagycsűr and withdrew to Temesvár.

Jelačić's arrival in early June led to successes like the Battle of Káty and the burning of Újvidék. However, his advance was halted with a defeat in the Battle of Kishegyes (July 14), forcing a retreat. Vécsey’s siege forced Arad’s surrender (July 1), but Temesvár remained in Austrian hands.

==== Klapka’s counterattack at Komárom ====
After Görgei’s departure, Klapka remained in Komárom. On August 3, in a surprise counterattack, he broke the siege, inflicted heavy losses, and advanced to Győr, sparking a brief uprising in Székesfehérvár. But the victory came too late to change the war’s outcome.

==== Surrender ====
In July, General Dembiński was appointed commander-in-chief in the Tiszántúl region and united his troops with the Army of the South at Szeged to block Haynau’s crossing of the Tisza River.

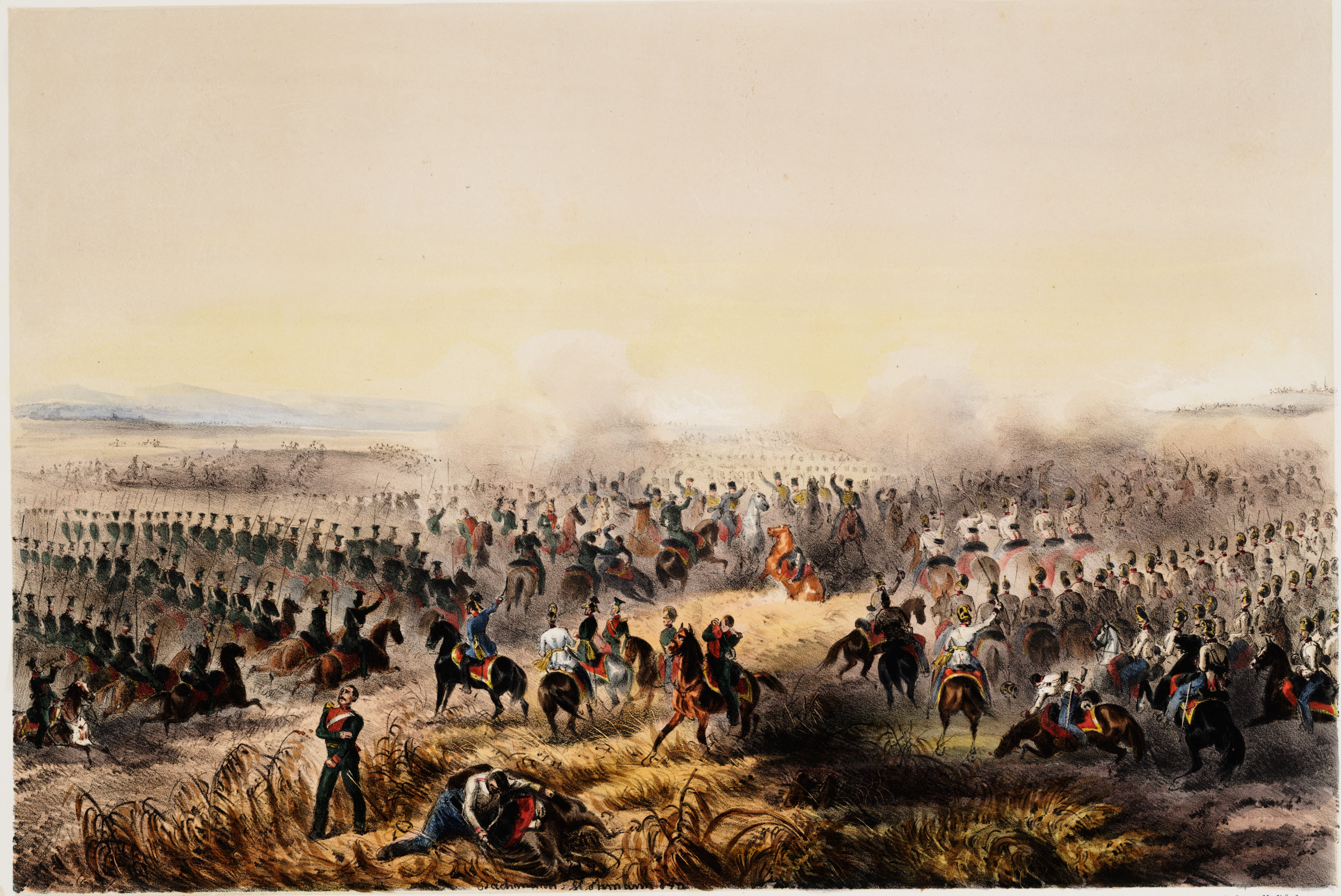
Battle of Temesvár

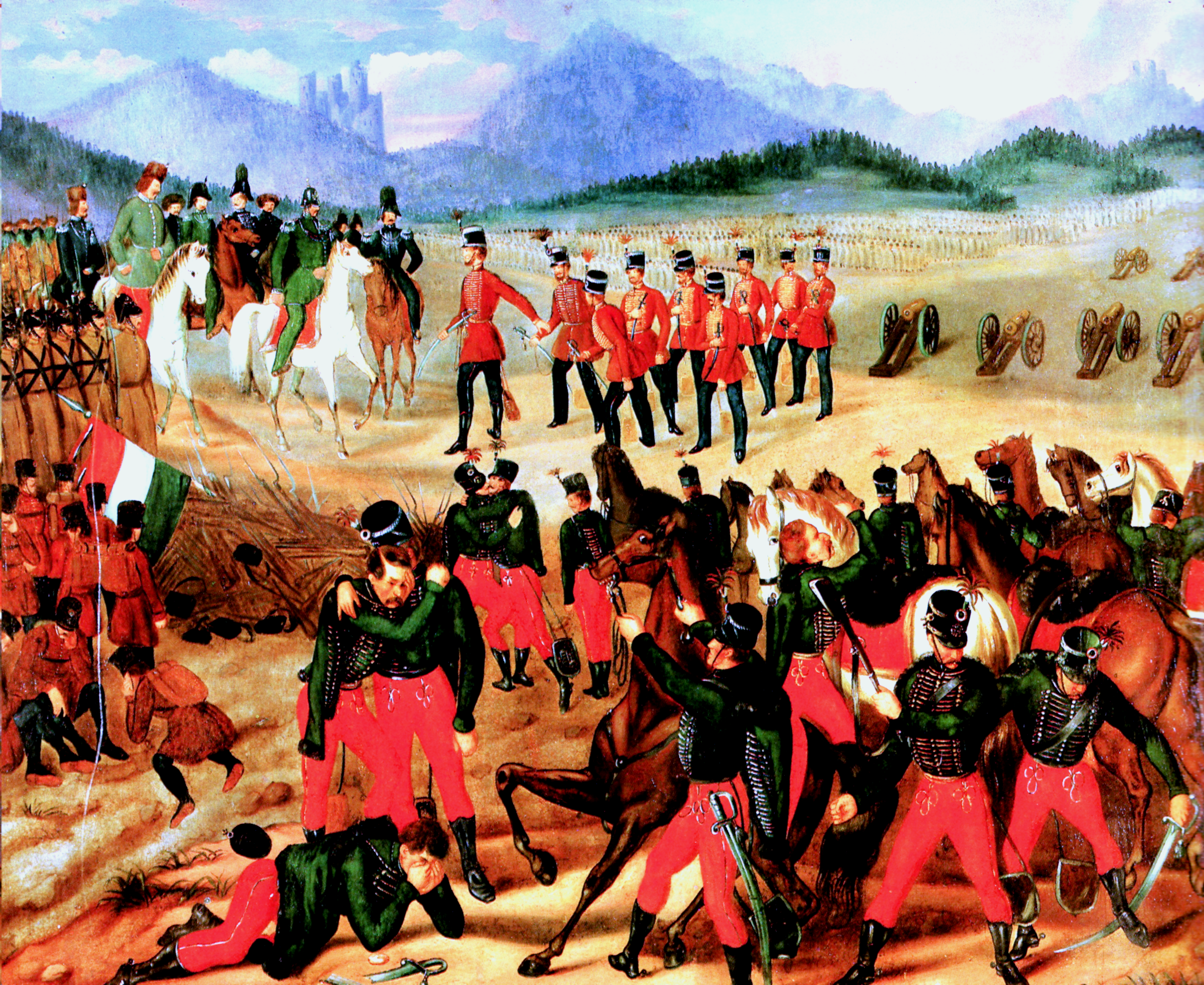
Surrender at Világos, 1849

However, Dembiński unexpectedly evacuated Szeged after Austrian troops arrived.

On August 5, Haynau crossed the Tisza and defeated Dembiński’s forces at the Battle of Szőreg. Disobeying Kossuth’s orders to move toward Arad, Dembiński marched toward Temesvár, possibly aiming for the Turkish border. Bem took command on August 9 but was decisively defeated at the Battle of Temesvár, partly due to Dembiński’s mismanagement of artillery supplies. After this collapse, Görgei’s army, reduced to fewer than 30,000 men, was the largest remaining Hungarian force but unable to reverse the situation. Holding dictatorial power, Görgei surrendered on August 13 at Világos (Szőlős). Subsequently, remaining Hungarian units surrendered mostly to Russian forces, and fortresses fell one by one, with Komárom holding out until early October.

== Aftermath ==
Julius Jacob von Haynau, the leader of the Austrian army, was appointed plenipotentiary to restore order in Hungary after the conflict. He ordered the execution of the 13 Martyrs of Arad (now Arad, Romania) and Prime Minister Batthyány was executed the same day in Pest.

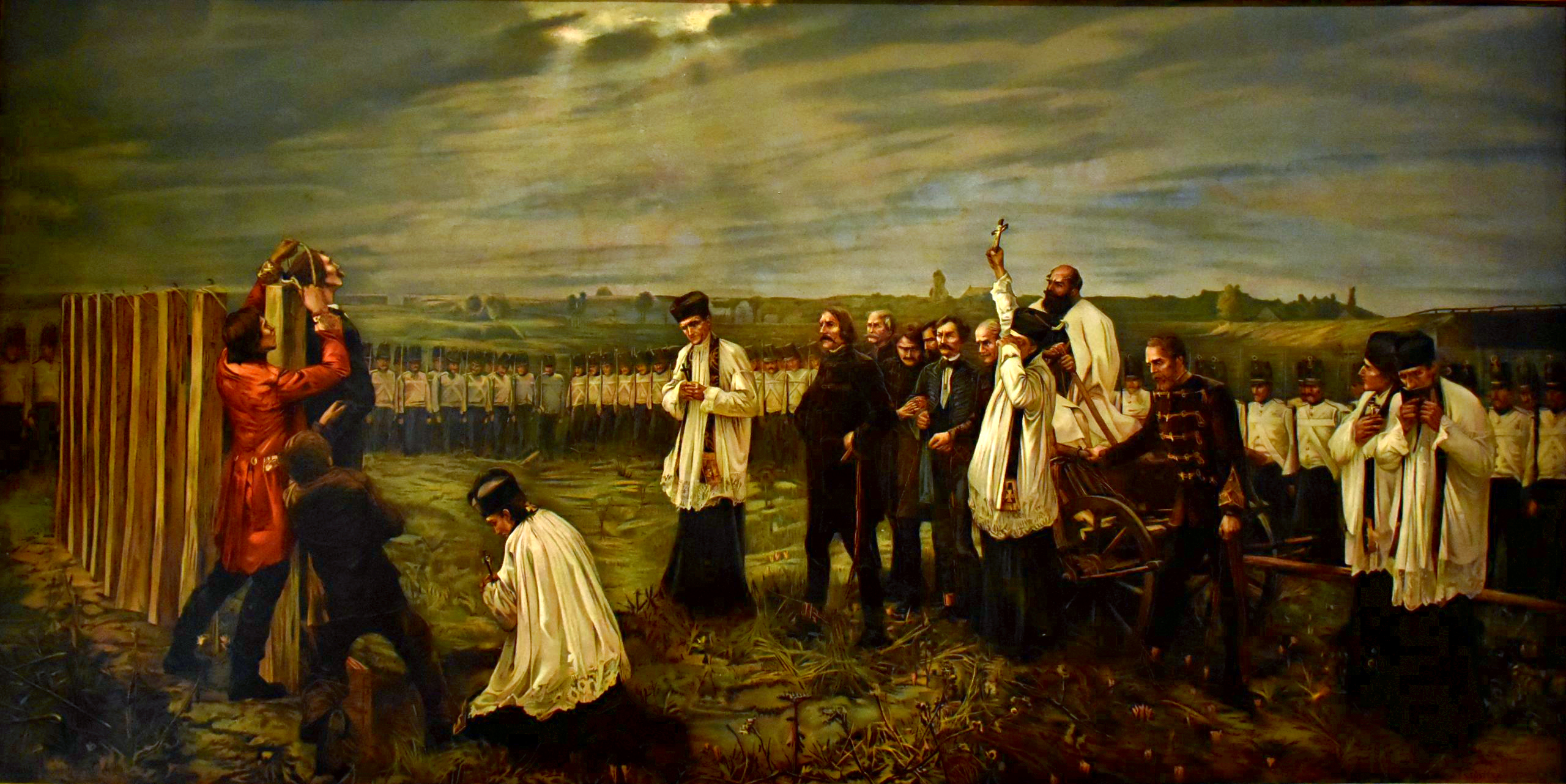
Thorma János: Execution of the Hungarian generals at Arad on 6 October 1849

After the failed revolution, in 1849 there was nationwide "passive resistance". In 1851 Archduke Albrecht, Duke of Teschen was appointed as Regent, which lasted until 1860, during which time he implemented a process of Germanisation.

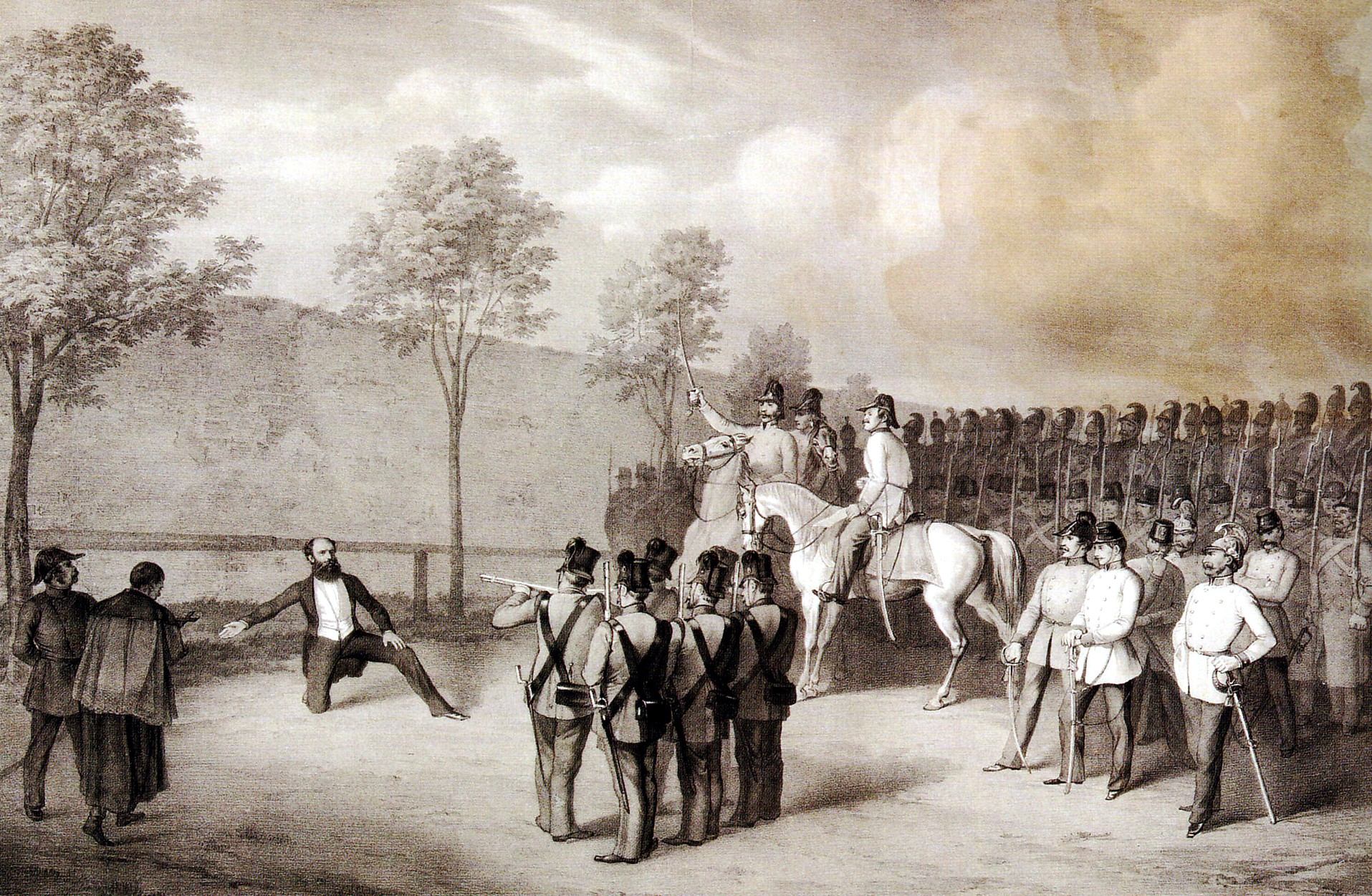
Execution of prime minister Lajos Batthyány at Pest on 6 October 1849

Kossuth went into exile after the revolution, initially gaining asylum in the Ottoman Empire, where he resided in Kütahya until 1851. That year the US Congress invited him to come to the United States. He left the Ottoman Empire in September, stopped in Britain, then arrived in New York in December. In the US he was warmly received by the general public as well as the then US Secretary of State, Daniel Webster, which made relations between the US and Austria somewhat strained for the following twenty years. Kossuth County, Iowa was named for him. He left the United States for England in the summer of 1852. He remained there until 1859, when he moved to Turin, at the time the capital of Piedmont-Sardinia, in hopes of returning to Hungary. He never did.

Kossuth thought his biggest mistake was to confront the Hungarian minorities. He set forth the dream of a multi-ethnic confederation of republics along the Danube, which might have prevented the escalation of hostile feelings between the ethnic groups in these areas.

Many of Kossuth's comrades-in-exile joined him in the United States, including the sons of one of his sisters. Some of these "Forty-Eighters" remained after Kossuth departed, and fought on the Union side in the US Civil War. Hungarian lawyer George Lichtenstein, who served as Kossuth's private secretary, fled to Königsberg after the revolution and eventually settled in Edinburgh where he became noted as a musician.

After the Hungarian Army's surrender at Világos in 1849, their revolutionary banners were taken to Russia by the Tsarist troops, and were kept there both under the Tsarist and Communist systems. In 1940 the Soviet Union offered the banners to the Horthy government in exchange for the release of the imprisoned Hungarian Communist leader Mátyás Rákosi – the Horthy government accepted the offer.

According to legend, Hungarians do not clink beer glasses together, in memory of Austrians doing so after the revolution's suppression.

The Hungarian Revolution and War of Independence of 1848–49 caused fundamental, decisive changes in social thinking, and in a short time transformed bold ideas into Laws, which could not be negated even when they had been abolished by the "old order". But only for a short while, because the ideas of the Reform Age and Revolution became again laws, winning the final victory after the Austro-Hungarian Compromise of 1867.

Hungary made the Austrian Empire understand that it could not defeat it alone. This in turn provided the country with the political capital that led to the Compromise of 1867. During the War of Independence, this strength was represented by the Honvéd Army, which was able to stand as an equal opponent to one of the most powerful armies in Europe, the Austrian Imperial-Royal (K.u.K.) Army.

=== Hungarian revolutionaries in the American Civil War ===
During the year 1861, the United States of America had a relatively small Hungarian population of around 4,000 individuals. Surprisingly, out of this number, 1,000 Hungarians joined the Union Army, which was an unmatched percentage compared to other immigrant communities. This fact speaks to the exceptional military qualities possessed by these Hungarians. Despite their small representation, five individuals rose to the rank of brigadier general, fifteen became colonels, two achieved the rank of lieutenant colonel, fourteen were promoted to major, and fifteen held the position of captain.

General Julius Stahel-Számwald led a brigade, while General Alexander Asbóth was appointed as the commandant of an entire military zone. Notable achievements were also made by Colonel Philip Figyelmessy and Colonel Géza Mihalóczy, who served as staff officers. Additionally, Colonel George Utassy played a pivotal role as the organizer and commander of the New York Infantry Regiment, known as the Garibaldi Guard. Another remarkable feat was accomplished by Colonel Charles Zágonyi, who, with his Frémont Guard, fearlessly charged against significantly superior hostile forces, capturing the Heights of Springfield. This daring action later became known in American history as Zágonyi's Death Ride.

At the onset of the Civil War, President Abraham Lincoln appointed Ladislas Ujházy as Consul in Ancona. Following the war's conclusion, a number of other Hungarians were offered positions in the American diplomatic and consular services, as well as various other public services.

== See also ==
- Transylvanian Revolution
- 1848–1849 massacres in Transylvania
- László Lovassy
- Hungarian Revolution of 1956
- Bourgeois revolution
- Revolutionary Spring: Fighting for a New World 1848–1849 by Christopher Clark

== Sources ==
- Bona, Gábor (1999). The Hungarian Revolution and War of Independence, 1848-1849. A Military History. New York: Columbia University Press. p. 606. ISBN 0-88033-433-9.
- Csikány, Tamás (2004). A magyar honvédség 1848-1989 I [The Hungarian Honvéd Army 1848-1989 I] (in Hungarian). ZrÍnyi Miklós Nemzetvédelmi Egyetem Egyetemi Kiadó.
- Egyed, Ákos (2010). Erdély 1848–1849 ("Transylvania in 1848-1849") (in Hungarian). Csíkszereda: Pallas-Akadémia Könyvkiadó. p. 616. ISBN 978-973-665-312-4.
- Hermann, Róbert (1999). Az abrudbányai tragédia, 1849 [The Tragedy of Abrudbánya, 1849] (in Hungarian). Budapest: Heraldika Kiadó. p. 330. ISBN 963-858-5315.
- Hermann, Róbert (2001). 1848-1849. A szabadságharc hadtörténete ("1848–1849. The History of the War of Independence) (in Hungarian). Budapest: Korona Kiadó. p. 424. ISBN 9639376213.
- Hermann, Róbert (2004). Az 1848–1849-es szabadságharc nagy csatái ("Great battles of the Hungarian War of Independence of 1848–1849") (in Hungarian). Budapest: Zrínyi. ISBN 963-327-367-6.
- Judah, Tim (1997). The Serbs: History, Myth & the Destruction of Yugoslavia. New Haven, CT: Yale. ISBN 978-0-300-08507-5.
- Marx, Karl; Engels, Friedrich. "Articles from the Neue Rheinische Zeitung: March 6 – May 19, 1849". Collected Works. Vol. 9. Archived from the original on 2005-02-09 – via Marxists.
- Rédvay, István (1941). Huszáraink hazatérése 1848/49-ben ("Return of our Hussars in 1848/49) (PDF). Vitézi Rend Zrínyi Csoportja.
- Spira, György (1959). A magyar forradalom 1848–49-ben [The Hungarian Revolution in 1848–1849] (in Hungarian). Budapest: Gondolat Kiadó. p. 676.
