= Karl Knezich =

Hungarian general

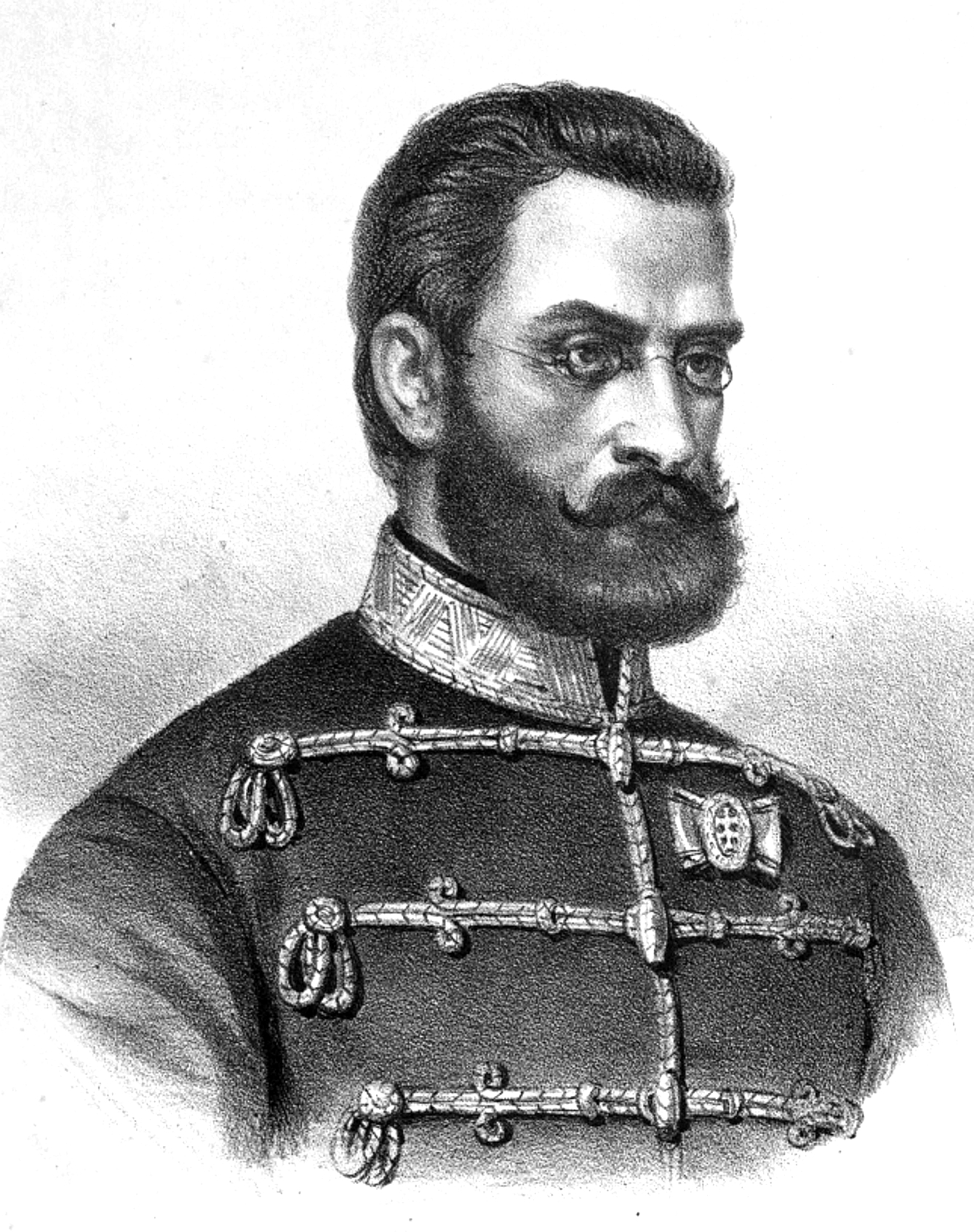

Governor of Transylvania
- Appointed, but never took office de jure or de facto (Note: Appointed by Lajos Kossuth; never took office de jure or de facto due to the imminent collapse of the military front. He remained in active military command until the surrender at Világos.)
- In office July 1849 – July 1849 (only appointed, never served)
- President: Lajos Kossuth
- Preceded by: Imre Mikó
- Succeeded by: Ludwig von Wohlgemuth

Personal details
- Born: 6 September 1808 Veliki Grđevac, Warasdiner Generalat (now Croatia)
- Died: 6 October 1849 (aged 41) Arad

Military service
- Allegiance: Habsburg Monarchy (–1848); Hungarian Revolution (1848–49)
- Years of service: 1830s–1849
- Rank: captain, lieutenant, major-general
- Battles/wars: Hungarian Revolution of 1848

Karl Knezich (Hungarian: Knézich Károly, Croatian: Dragutin Knezić; 1808–1849) was a honvéd general in the Hungarian Army. He was executed for his part in the Hungarian Revolution of 1848, and is considered one of the 13 Martyrs of Arad.

== Family ==
Knezich (Serbo-Croatian: Knezić, Hungarian: Knézich) was born in Veliki Grđevac in the Warasdiner Generalat (now Croatia), the son of a Military Frontier officer and a Hungarian mother, his family was of mixed Serb and Croat ancestry. His mother Borbála Benkő was related to Mihajlo Latas, an officer who later escaped Austria and became known as the Ottoman general "Omar Pasha".

Knézich was engaged to (14 July 1842) and then married (3 June 1844) Katalin Kapitány (d. 1853), an Orthodox Christian, the daughter of captain Mihály Kapitány of Tánács, whose father or ancestor Ádám Mihály hailed from Moscopole ("in Macedonia", now southeast Albania). Ádám Mihály was buried at the Orthodox church in Eger.

With Kapitány, he had two daughters:

- Olga (Eger, July 1845 - Miskolc, May 1898), married to József Gröber
- Irén (Eger, July 1847 - Eger, August 1882), married to Sándor Gröber

His wife was buried at the Orthodox church in Eger, with her full name inscribed, Hungarian transcription Jekaterina Valova Kraléva Knezicsa.

== Career ==
After graduating from military schools, he became a lieutenant, and in the early 1840s, a captain in the 34th Infantry Regiment stationed in Galicia. As part of the 3rd Battalion he was ordered to Eger, where he met his future wife. Prior to the revolution, he was the hauptmann of the 34rd Infantry Regiment of Prussia.

Knezich supported the Hungarian cause and at first fought Slovak militias. In the second half of June 1848 his unit was sent to fight the pro-Habsburg Serbs that revolted. His assistant described Knezich as being a man of "order and punctuality", who knew many in the crews of his brigade and later division by name, and personally took care of supplies as he often uttered "only a hungry and ragged soldier is a coward". If it was necessary, he would go without food and water the longest and while camping, he ordinarily lay on bare ground and in the mud.

Knezich's troops fought at Szenttamás, then went to Szeged and from there Törökszentmiklós (February 1849). In 1849, with the defeat at Kápolna, his troops were ordered to cross the Tisza to unite with János Damjanich's troops and attack Szolnok. The Knezich's brigade crossed the Tisza at Várkony on 5 March, where he and János Damjanich were introduced. Damjanich, a Serb, reportedly hugged him and said "I tremble with joy at the fact that at last I see again a Slav who fears God more than the world".

At Szolnok (5 March 1849), Knezich's brigade fought in the center-right. Starting out from the Middle Tisza, he served in the III Corps under Damjanich, then joined the Upper Army (I and II Corps). At Tápióbicske (4 April) he occupied and held onto a bridge of strategic importance. He fought at the difficult battles of Isaszeg (6 April 1849), Vác (10 April 1849) and Komárom (26 April 1849). After this he was honoured with the rank of general and 2nd Class War Medal. The III Corps marched under his command to Buda, as Damjanich had difficulty due to a broken leg. Due to his military success and distinction he had at this point been promoted to major-general. During the siege of Buda (4–21 May 1849), he received information that his brother, a major, fought in the Austrian camp. Upset, he handed over command to one of his officers, and upon victory his brother was captured but unharmed. His brother soon escaped back to the Austrian army.

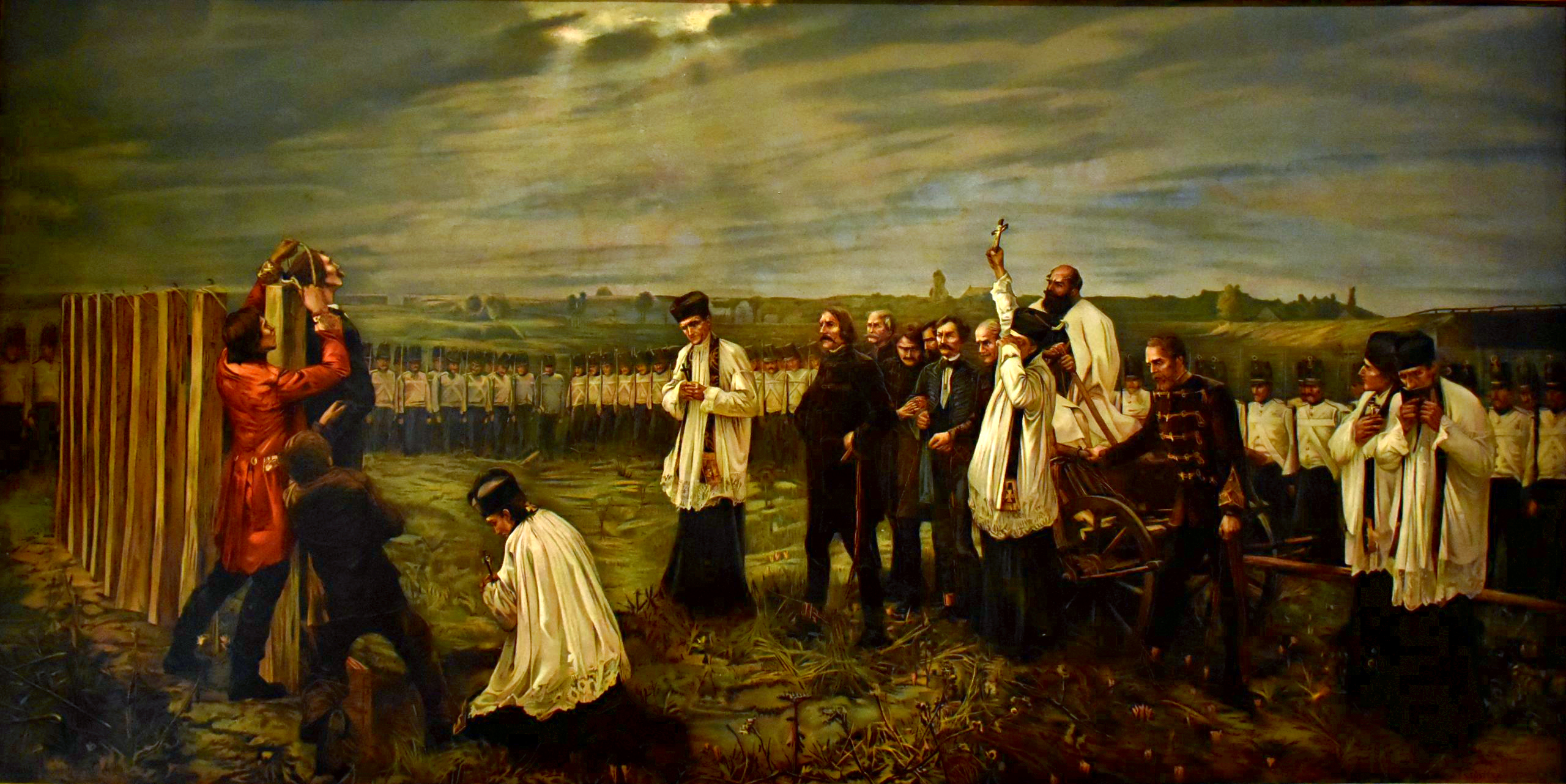
Execution of the Martyrs of Arad. Work by János Thorma.

After the battle of Pered (20–21 June 1849), when Artúr Görgei was removed from command and Lajos Kossuth was appointed Corps commander of the Upper Tisza army, Knezich then served in the Ministry of Defence. Kossuth gave Knezich a post as governor of Transylvania, but the deterioration of the military situation led to a rather rapid collapse of leadership. After the army laid down their weapons and surrendered to the Russians, he, along with the other prisoners, was handed over to the Austrian military and entered the Arad prison. His wife initially attended him, but he sent her home in September. The Austrians held a court martial for all the leaders of the Hungarian army. He was sentenced to death by hanging, and was eighth in the line to be executed (fourth among those executed by hanging). His bones were uncovered in 1932 during the flood of Arad and his remains currently rests in the Arad cemetery crypt. Knezich was one of the "13 Martyrs of Arad", the name for the executed rebel generals. Interestingly, the majority of those generals were not ethnic Hungarian.

== Sources ==
- Levitschnigg, Heinrich Ritter von (1850). "XIX. Knezich". Kossuth und seine Bannerschaft: Silhouetten aus dem Nachmärz in Ungarn. Heckenast. "Karl Knezich"
- Oláh, András (October 2000), "A tábornok, aki nem írt levelet" [The General Who Didn't Write a Letter], Hevesi Napló, ISSN 1417-7080, archived from the original on 4 March 2016
- Varga, Ottó (1890). "Knézich Károly". Aradi vértanúk albuma. Arad Sz. Kir. Város Tulajdona.
- Wurzbach, Constantin von (1864). Biographisches Lexikon des Kaiserthums Oesterreich: Karolyi—Kiwisch. Vol. 11. Verlag d. typograf.-literarisch-artist. Anstalt. "Karl Knezich"
