= Ernő Kiss =

Hungarian general

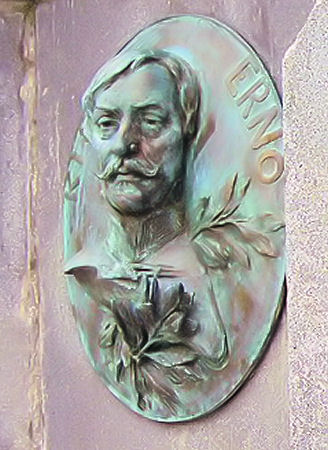

Ernő Kiss (13 June 1799 – 6 October 1849) was a honvéd (Hungarian Army) lieutenant-general. He was executed for his part in the Hungarian Revolution of 1848 and is considered one of the 13 Martyrs of Arad. Ernő Kiss was from a Transylvanian family with Armenian roots.

== Family ==
Kiss was born into a wealthy aristocratic family of Armenian origin. The original name of the family was Ázád. His grandfather was Izsák Kiss, who by redeeming the Saxon tithes in Transylvania made useful services to the treasury. In 1782 for this he earned for himself and his heirs two estates in Torontál County which after his death in 1807 went to the family. His father was Ágoston Kiss and his mother was Anna Bogdanovics who after had been early widowed married later with Ernő Leuven. He had two siblings: Gergely who died in 1815, and a sister Mária who became the wife of István Pejachevich.

His wife was Krisztina Horváth, and they had three daughters:

- Ernesztin, who died at the age of seven
- Auguszta (1822-1900). After the defeat of the rebellion she was imprisoned in Temesvár (present-day Timișoara) where she was interrogated about the possible location of the Holy Crown. After having released she had been under observation for two years. Her husband was János Dániel who was the vice-ispán of Torontál County, died in 1888.
- Róza (1823-1900), who married with György Bobor (1819-1879)
- Ernő Turati, whom he had by another woman, lived in Italy.

== Career ==
After graduating from the Vienna Theresianum in 1818 Kiss joined the Imperial army's cavalry regiment. In 1845 he was the commander of the 2. (Hannover) cavalry regiment. Under his command also served future martyrs of Arad such as József Nagysándor and Károly Vécsey. In the spring of 1848 he stationed with his regiment in Nagykikinda (present-day Kikinda) thus he participated in battles against the Serb rebels. He initiated the first major victory in the southern land, capturing the Serbian camp in Perlasz (present-day Perlez) on 2 September.

Before the Battle of Pákozd, Lajos Batthyány wanted Kiss to take the leadership of the main Hungarian Army but finally it did not happen because at the military council in Sukoró János Móga volunteered to fight against the Croats. Kiss served only as an observer in the battle. On 12 October he was appointed as a major general and took the leadership of the Banat corps.

On 12 December Kiss was promoted to lieutenant general but after the Battle of Pancsova (present-day Pančevo) on 2 January, he resigned and handed over the leadership to János Damjanich on 9 January. In Debrecen he was appointed to the leader of the Army High Command. On 9 March he received the II. Class Order of Merit of the Hungarian military. Until the end of the War of Independence he substituted more occasions the Minister of Defence. After the surrender of Világos, Kiss was captured and brought into the custody of Czarist Russia, and later he was turned over to Imperial Austrian captivity.

== Aftermath ==
Kiss' sentence was modified to death by firing squad instead of hanging because he did not command legions against the Imperial Austrian army (this happened with József Schweidel also because of the same reason). He took the first shot into his shoulder, soon after he commanded fire to the puzzled firing squad. After this he was executed from a short distance. He was the third of four who were executed by firing squad.

After the execution he was exhumed by his orderly who buried him under a pseudonym in the cemetery of Arad. Later he was re-buried at Katalinfalva (present-day Ravni Topolovac) where his body stayed for sixteen years. Afterwards his family moved his body to the family crypt, and since then his body has remained in the Catholic church in Elemér (present-day Elemir).

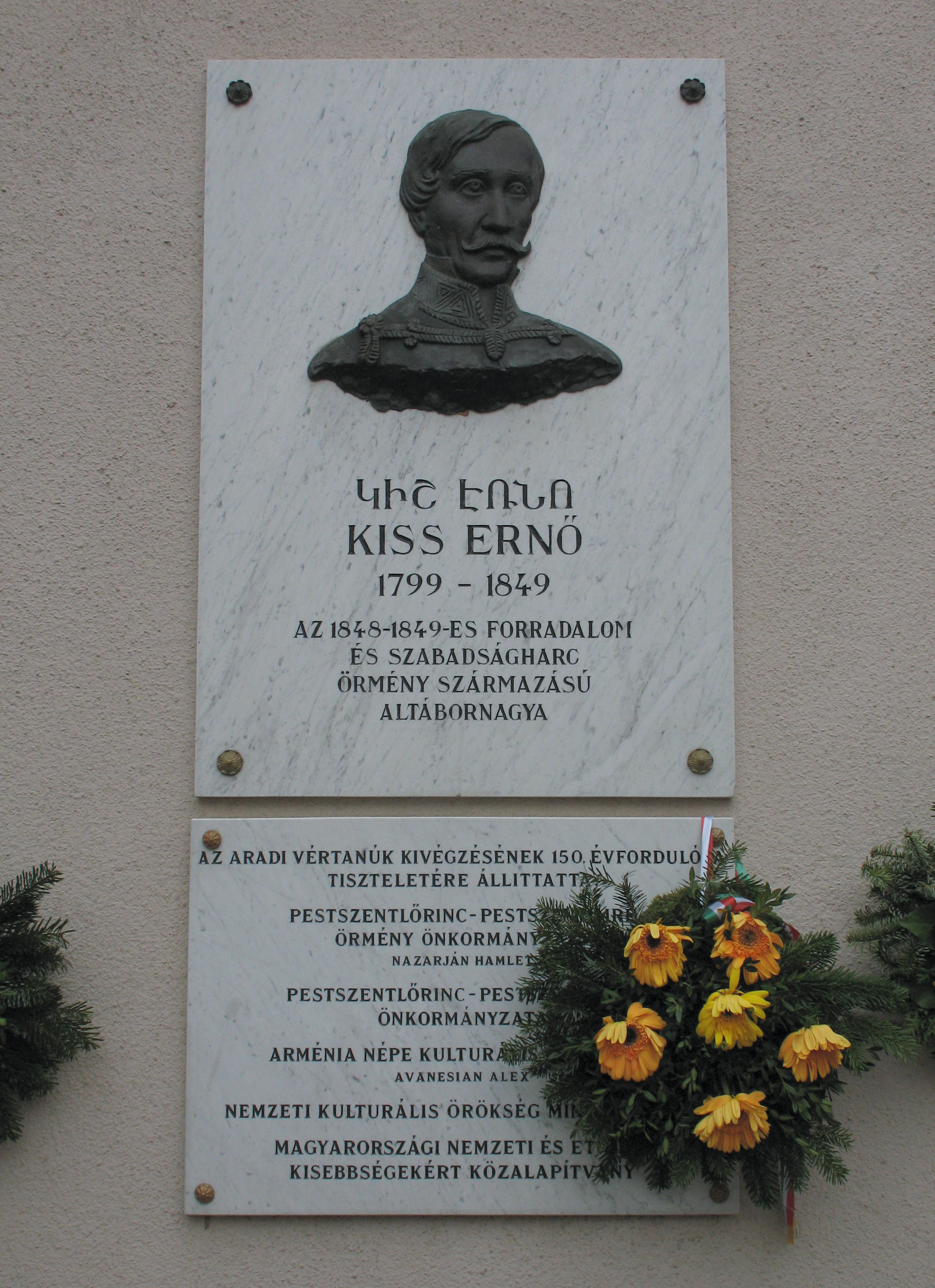
Memorial tablet in Budapest

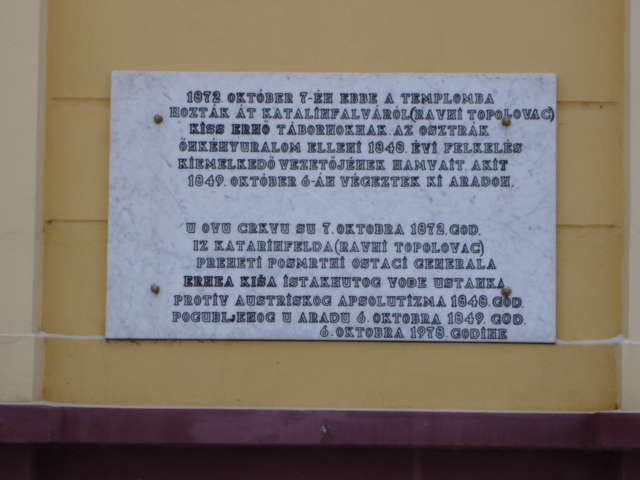
Memorial tablet in Elemir (in Hungarian and Serbian)
