= György Lahner =

Hungarian general

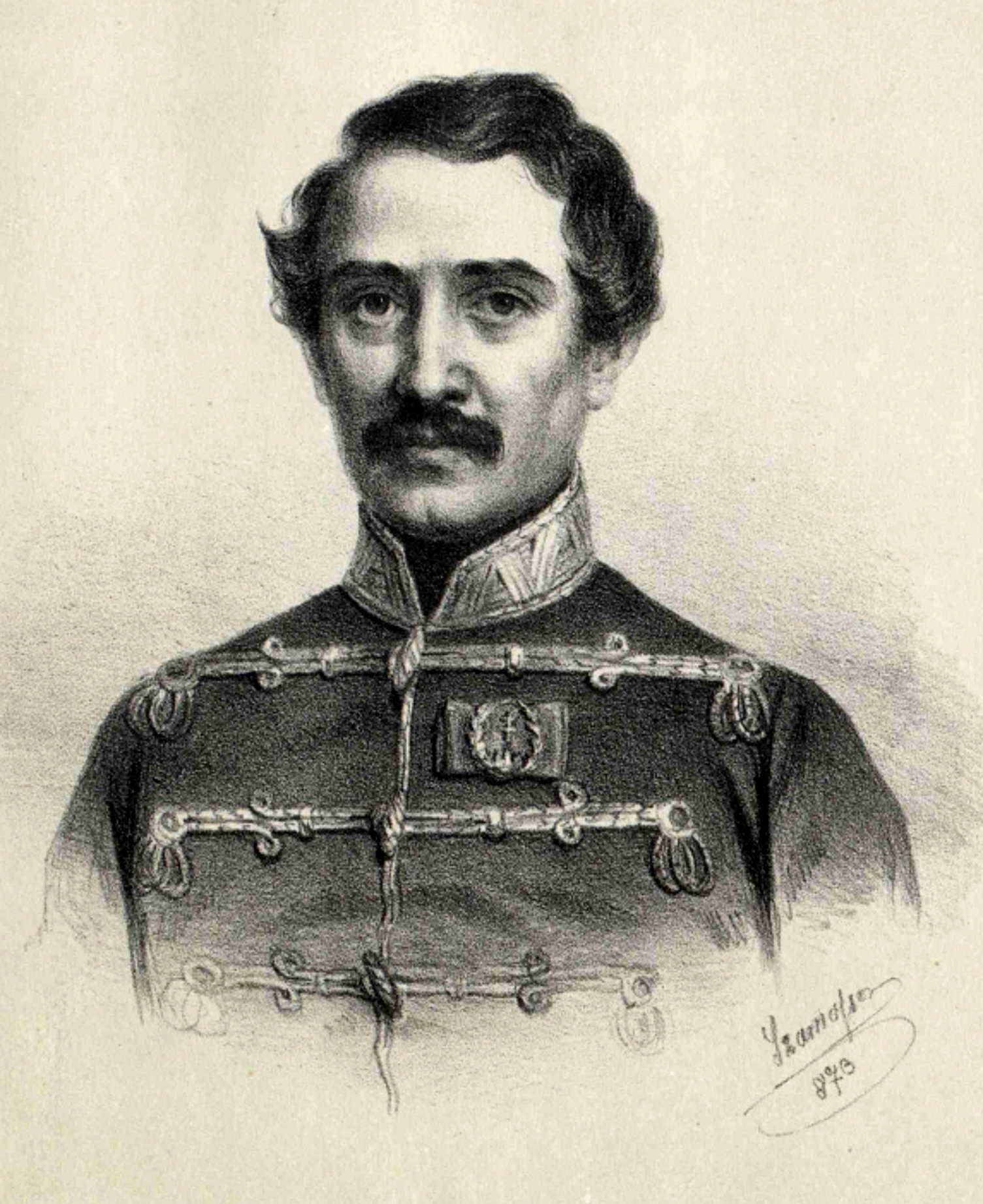
György Lahner

György Lahner (also Láner or Láhner, German: Georg Lahner; 6 October 1795 in Necpál (present-day Necpaly, Slovakia) – 6 October 1849 in Arad) was a honvéd general in the Hungarian Army. He was executed for his role in the Hungarian Revolution of 1848, and is remembered one of the 13 Martyrs of Arad.

== Life ==
Lahner was born in Necpál, Turóc County in 1795, to a German bourgeois family. Lahner's military career in the Imperial army began in 1816 when he joined the 33rd infantry. His wife, Conchetti Lucia, was of Italian descent, who bore him a daughter from this marriage.

He offered military service in the Spring of 1848 to the Hungarian government during the uprising, although he only smattered in Hungarian. Becoming the third honvéd in September 1848 he acted as commander of the southern areas. In October, the Ministry of Defence appointed him as the superintendent of military equipment and armaments in the rank of colonel. In this capacity, he was focused on the Hungarian arms production and boosting production. Lahner successfully completed the most organized changes and productions then to date in Hungary and as a result boosted munitions supply.

However, due to the onslaught of Windisch-Grätz, he was forced to retire in December 1848 from Pest, and re-establish facilities in the east. Lahner planned an organized and professional evacuation and decommissioning of the plants so that there was the possibility to continue on the fight. On February 6, 1849, he was promoted to the rank of general.

Despite the hardship of evacuating the machinery, Lahner was able to erect new facilities in Nagyvárad (present-day Oradea) in a minimum loss of time and began production again very quickly and made launching a spring offensive a possibility. Nagyvárad became the largest arms and munitions producer and cache in all of Hungary. The facilities for producing various weapons, firearms, bayonets, swords, were placed in different parts of the nearby castles, such as the dungeons. Lahner published a military science work under the headline "Do not hurt the Hungarians" in May 1849. The Military Council decided that after some months the munitions depots and factories should be moved back to Budapest, closer to the action on the front. Lahner was distinguished with exemplary leadership and performance.

== Death ==
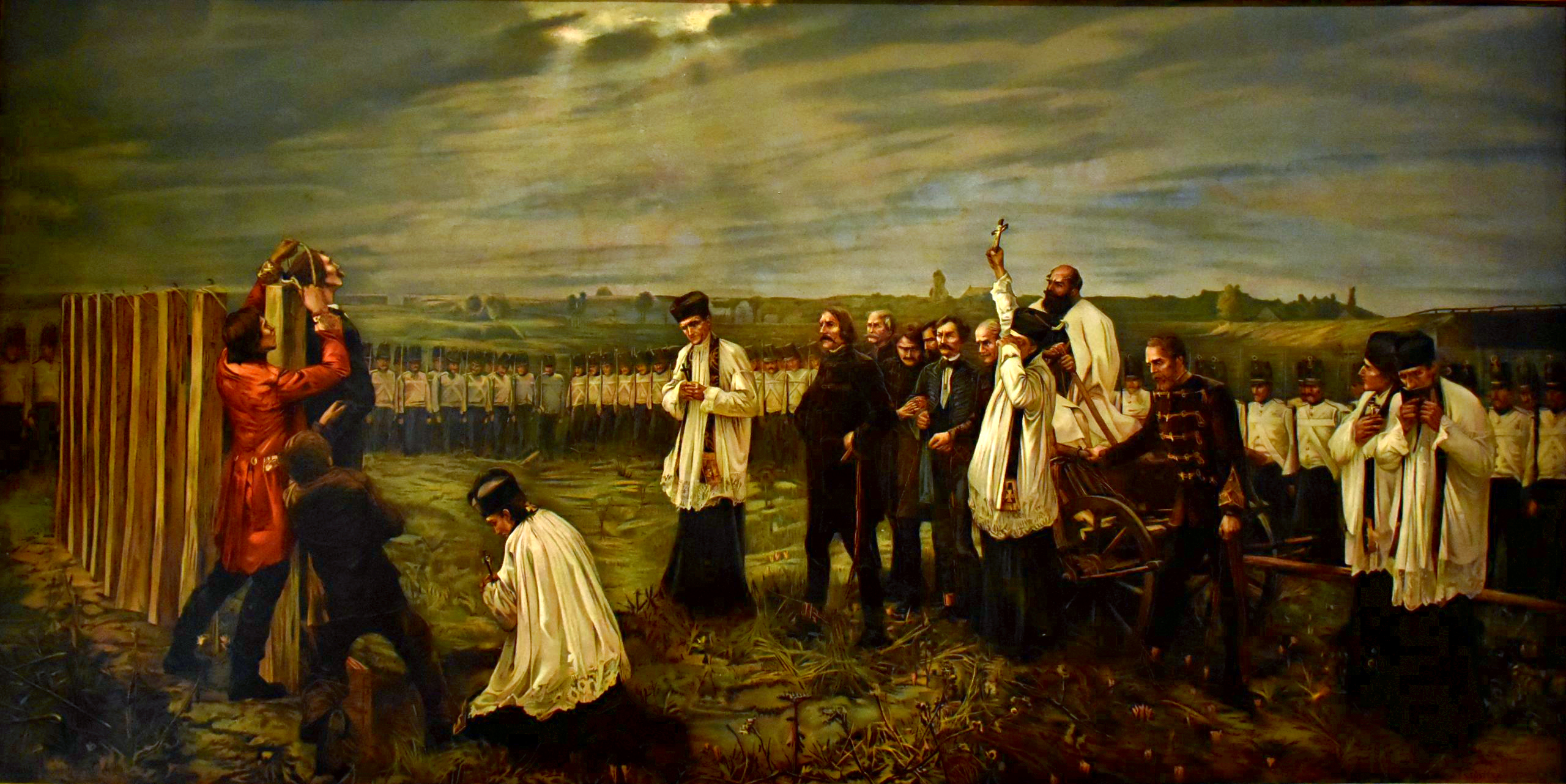
Execution of the Martyrs of Arad. Work by János Thorma.

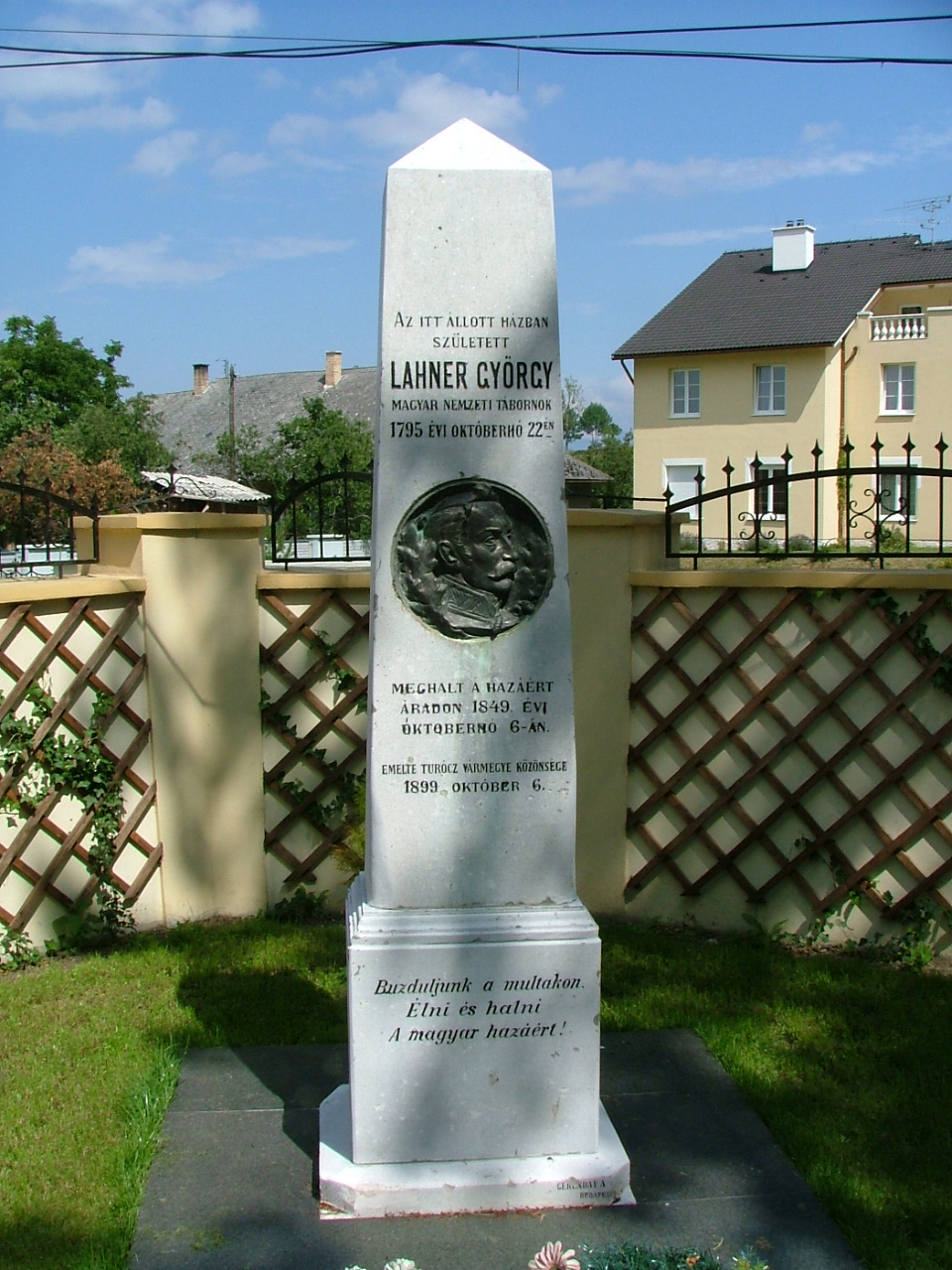
Lahner's resting place at Necpál

After the defeat of the uprising, Lahner was captured and sentenced to death by hanging, and carried out on his birthday. The sheriff of his home town bribed the executioners to allow him to take his body back to Necpál to be buried there where it rested until 1974, when the bones were moved to a crypt.
