= Vilmos Lázár =

Hungarian general

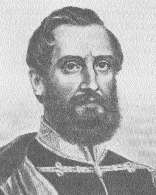
- Born: October 24, 1817
- Died: October 6, 1849 (aged 31)
- Military career
- Rank: Colonel

Vilmos Lázár de Szkáros (24 October 1817 – 6 October 1849) was a honvéd colonel in the Hungarian Army. He was executed for his part in the Hungarian Revolution of 1848, and is considered one of the 13 Martyrs of Arad. According to historian Gábor Bóna, he was from a family of Hungarian nobility of Armenian descent.

== Life ==
Born into an Armenian-Hungarian noble family from Gherla that settled in Banat, Lázár began his military career in 1834 when he entered the service of the 34th infantry of the Imperial army. Emperor Ferdinand I commissioned him as a second lieutenant in the Hussar regiment, but in 1844 he retired from a military career and returned with his wife, Baroness Mária Revitzky to his estate farm in Zemplén. In 1847 he was the main cashier of the railway company.

As a result of the 1848 uprising, he volunteered his service into the Hungarian honvéd army. He became a lieutenant of the 39. Győr battalions on 19 October, and on 13 November he became the captain of the pioneer battalion. He participated in the organization of the pioneer staff and in January 1849 he served in the battalion of Mór Perczel. From 1 February on, he served in the rank of major as an adjutant of general Mihály Répásy. Representing the general, he participated in the assembly of Tiszafüred on 3 March where Görgei forced Dembiński to resign.

On 5 April Lázár was appointed as commander of a brigade stationed in Zemplén. His unit was responsible for securing the country's boundary with Galicia. At the end of the month the brigade was reassigned to the legion forming in Kassa (present-day Košice), Upper Hungary and he was promoted to a higher position. In the middle of June he became the commander of a division in the legion, which participated in the Dukla Pass battle's rearguard actions against a Russian Tsarist Army between 17 and 19 June. On 16 July he was promoted to lieutenant colonel and fought in the last battles of the war of independence. On 12 August, General Bem promoted him to colonel and instructed him to command IX. legion formed from the remainder of the Upper Hungarian corps. After the defeat Lázár led his troops to Lugos (present-day Lugoj), near Karánsebes (present-day Caransebeș). He split from Arisztid Dessewffy and headed towards Hátszeg (present-day Hațeg), but on 19 August along with the remainder of his legion (4,600 people) he had to lay down arms in front of the imperial troops.

== Death ==
Although Lázár only attained the rank of colonel, as a separate corps commander in the War of Independence he was considered to have equal status with the generals in the Arad military court martial. He was sentenced to execution by firing squad, seen as merciful in comparison to death by hanging. He was among the first group executed.

His bones were uncovered in 1913 at the Arad fortress cemetery. His body was then laid to rest in the crypt with a monument to him as a martyr. His wife was Baroness Mária Revitzky, a widow with three children from her first husband, Jószef Halasy de Dévaványa (1784–1844). She died in 1873, in Budapest at the age of 62 while visiting her son-in-law, Imre Székely.
