= Ignác Török =

Hungarian general

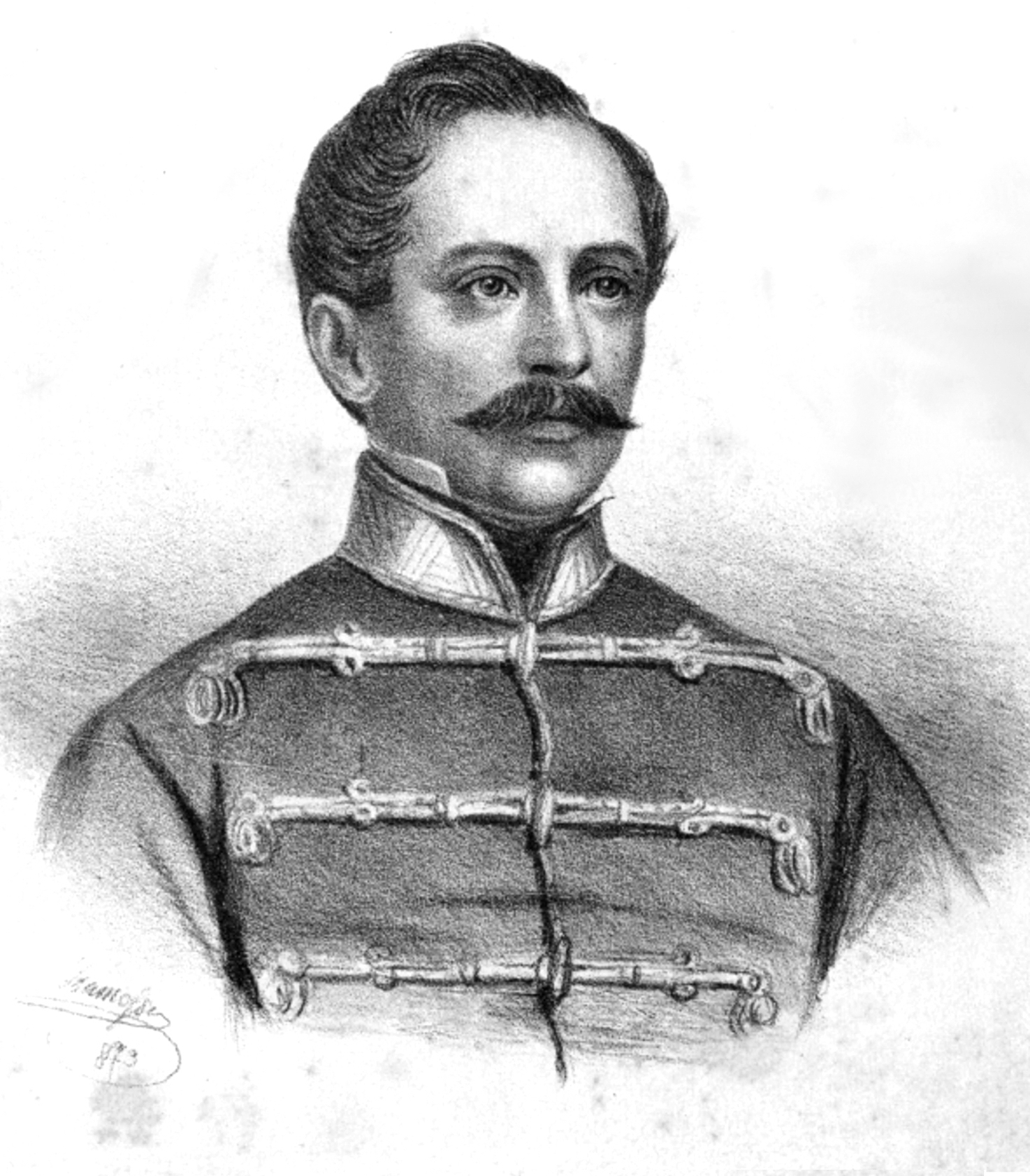
Ignác Török

Ignác Török (23 June 1795 – 6 October 1849) was a honvéd general in the Hungarian Army. He was executed for his part in the Hungarian Revolution of 1848, and is considered one of the 13 Martyrs of Arad.

== Family ==
He was born to a minor Hungarian noble family with some significant, although not very large, landholdings.

== Life ==
He received his education at the Royal Grammar Catholic University (now University of Budapest Catholic High School). He next enrolled at the military engineering academy in Vienna, and commissioned into the imperial army as a second lieutenant (1816). In 1839 he joined the noble Bodyguards where he taught siege tactics. He taught many notable people, including Artúr Görgei. Before the revolution, he served as a lieutenant first in Lemberg, then served as a lieutenant colonel in Zagreb.

=== War of Independence ===
In October 1848 he served at the castle of Komárom, and joined the full army of waiting for the defense. In the winter of 1848-1849 he was fortified in Komárom castle, building the defences. After Windisch-Gratz's success at Komárom, commander Majthényi along with many of the other officers at the castle were forced to resign, causing Ignác transfer to fill the position. The decision was confirmed by the government, and he was appointed General on 28 January. In April 1849 he was replaced by János Lenkey.

In June, he was ordered by the government to raze the defences of the recently liberated Buda to prevent its recapture. The ramparts at Szeged and to the right bank of the Tisza were razed.

== Death ==
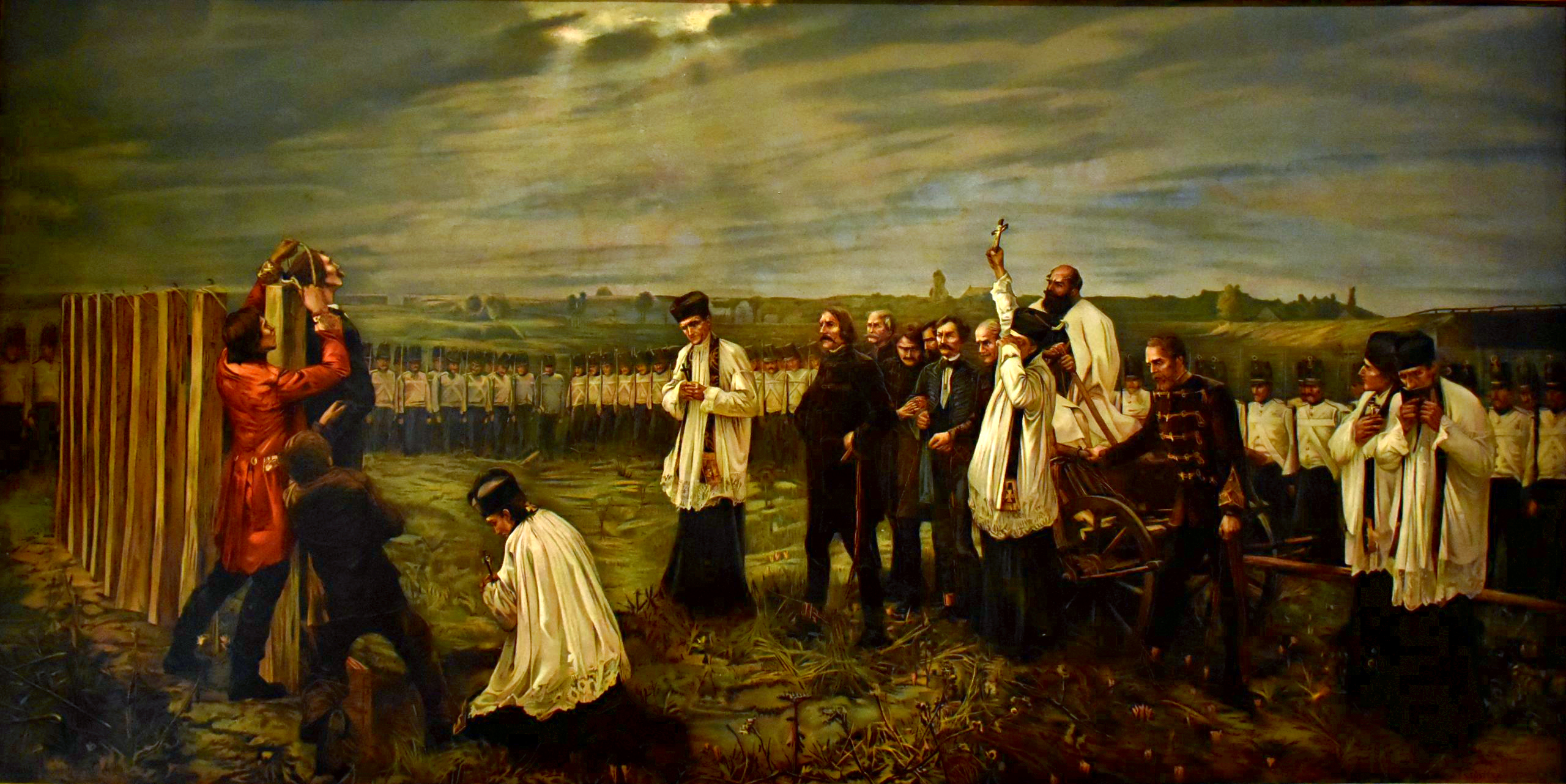
Execution of the Martyrs of Arad. Work by János Thorma.

After the surrender of the army at Arad, Török was court-martialed before an Austrian military court and sentenced to death by hanging. He defended himself by stating that "I went with my conscience". He was the sixth to be executed, second to be hanged.

In 1932 his remains were found in the Arad crypt.
