= Ernő Poeltenberg =

Hungarian general

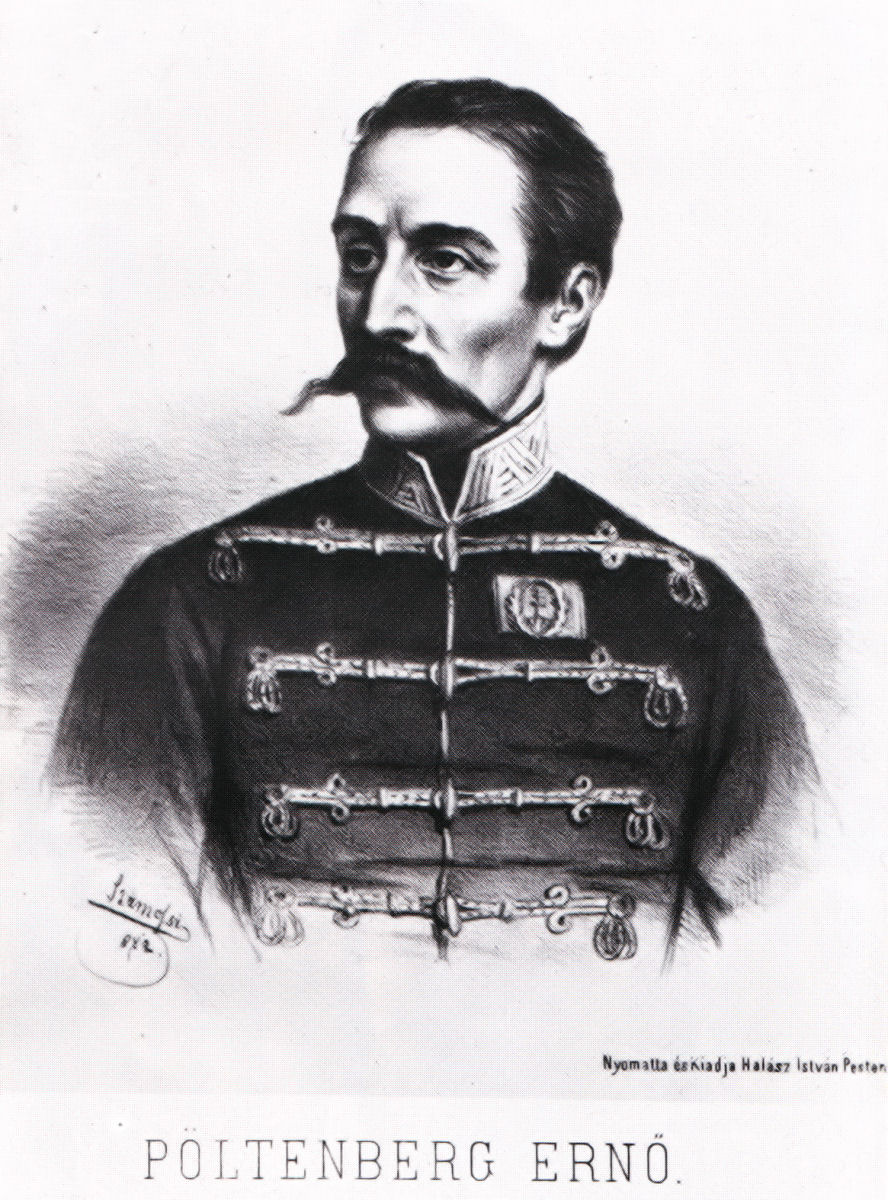
Ernő Poeltenberg

Ernő Poeltenberg (February 20, 1808, Vienna - October 6, 1849, Arad) was a honvéd general in the Hungarian Army. He was executed for his part in the Hungarian Revolution of 1848, and is considered one of the 13 Martyrs of Arad.

== Family ==
He was born into a wealthy Austrian family to Leopold Poelt von Poeltenberg, a lawyer. He also had two known sisters:

- Wilhelmina, an honorary member of the Order of St. Anne.
- Amália, whose husband was József Fackh the Austrian army colonel who in 1848 took over the defense against the Serbs and won the campaign and died in Verbász. He attained the rank of General. They had two sons, Károly and Gedő.

Poeltenberg's wife, Paula Kakovszka (Kakowska) was a Polish-born woman who died in Buda on 13 November 1874, at the age of 53. They had three children:

- Guido (1847, Pest-Buda - 1889), who had a military career like his father.
- Helena (1842-1922), who married Fackh Ilka. They had three children.
- Ilona (1842–1922)

== Career ==
In 1830 he entered military service for the Imperial Army, serving two years in the 4th hussar regiment as a second lieutenant. He later took a similar position at another post, but did not receive a promotion for almost 18 years. Stationed with his regiment in Hungary in the spring of 1848, he requested to be moved to Italy for action.

When the Hungarian revolution took place, he was a supporter and volunteered his service. He first fought against the Croatian Ban Jelačić but he disagreed crossing the Austrian border. Because of this, the Hungarian command dismissed him along with others from the service. Later he came under the command of Artúr Görgei who proposed him as a honvéd major on October 27, 1848. Later, in December he was appointed lieutenant colonel of the army.

At the Battle of Kápolna of February 26–27, he distinguished himself and on 14 April 1849 was promoted as the Colonel commanding the 7th Corps. Later he was promoted to General on 2 June. During the summer campaign against Haynau the army was forced to retreat. He participated in the Battle of Komárom (July 2 to July 11) and the Battle of Vác (July 15-July 17).

After the outnumbering Russian army appeared, he served as a mediator between the Hungarian and Russian armies for the terms of surrender. Next, he was captured, along with the other commanders, by Austrian authorities.

== Death ==
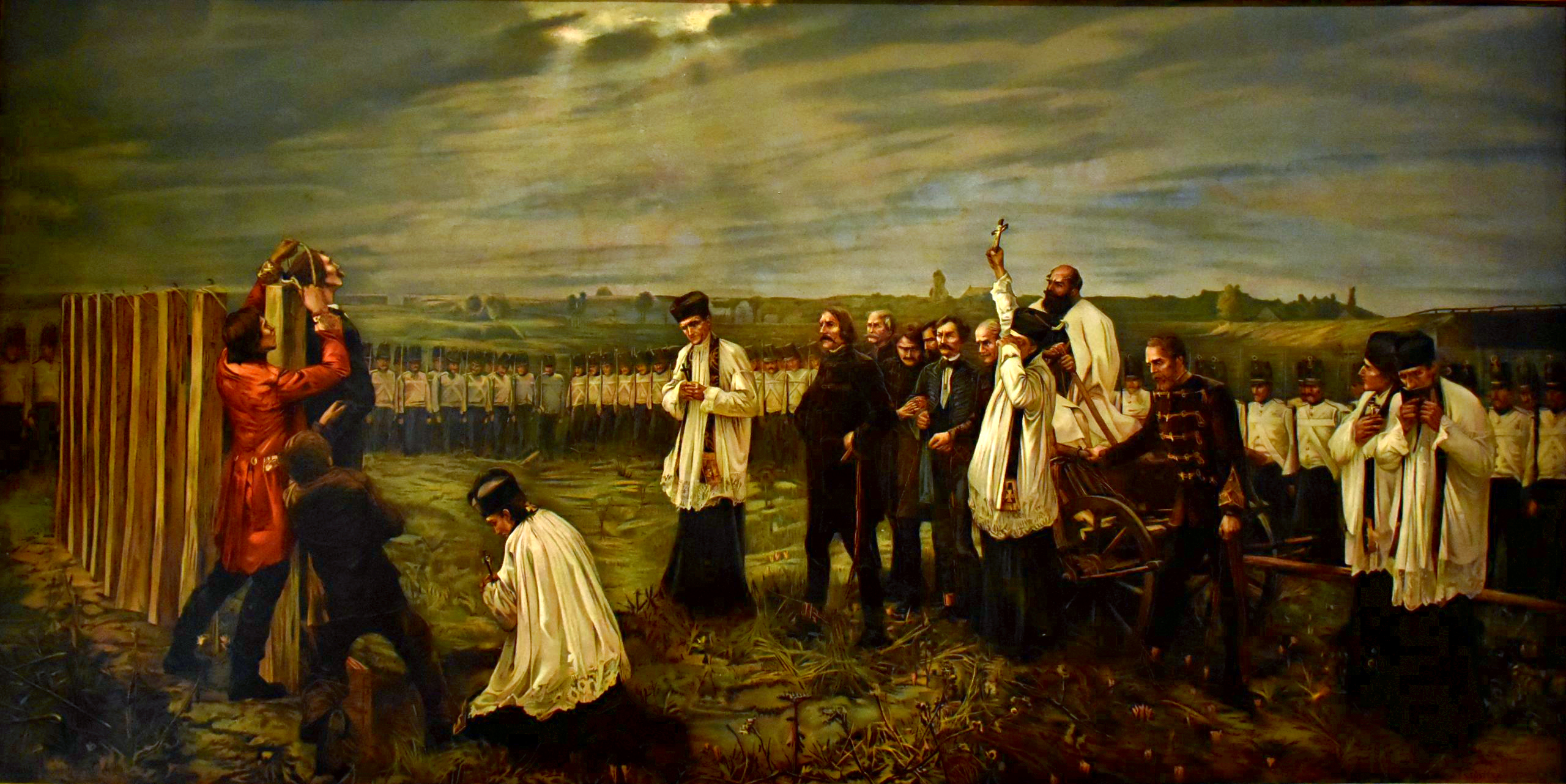
Execution of the Martyrs of Arad. Work by János Thorma.

Sentenced to death by hanging, it was carried out on the 5th (he was first among those executed by hanging) at Arad castle. He was hanged sometime between six and seven am. Just before his death at the gallows he is credited as having said "A beautiful deputation is heading to God to represent the case of the Hungarians!"
