= János Damjanich =

Hungarian general

General János Damjanich Јован Дамјанић Jovan Damjanić
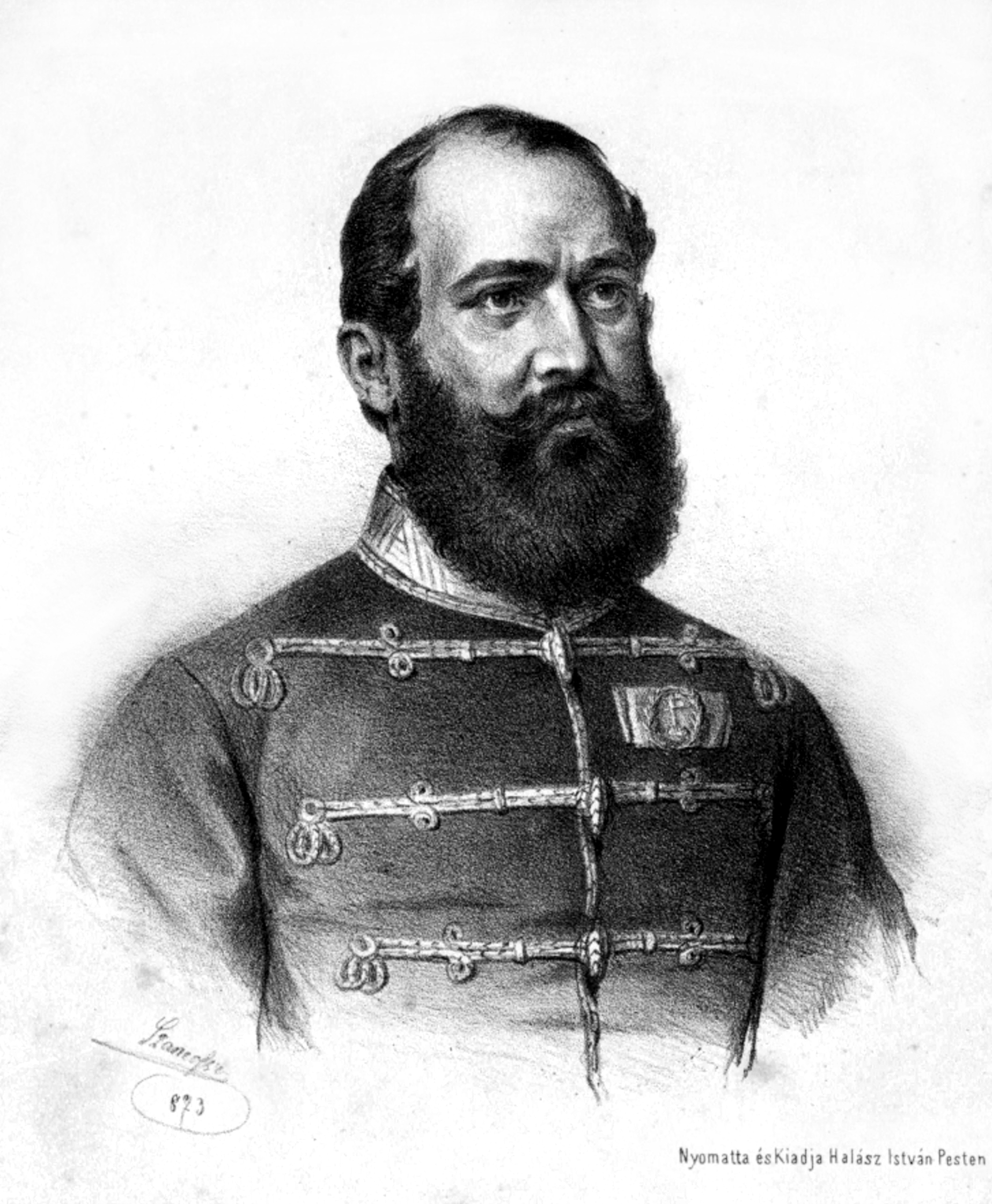
- Damjanich as depicted by Vince Grimm

Minister of War of the Hungarian State
- Acting
- In office 28 April 1849 – 29 April 1849
- Prime Minister: Lajos Kossuth
- Preceded by: Lázár Mészáros
- Succeeded by: Lázár Mészáros

Member of the National Assembly
- In office 18 June 1849 – 19 June 1849

Personal details
- Born: 8 December 1804 Staza, Croatian Military Frontier, Austrian Empire
- Died: 6 October 1849 (aged 44) Arad, Kingdom of Hungary
- Cause of death: Execution by hanging

Military service
- Allegiance: Austrian Empire; Hungarian Revolutionary Army
- Years of service: 1820-1849
- Rank: Major general
- Commands: 3rd Honved Battalion (1848); 3rd Army Corps (1849); Fortress of Arad (1849)
- Battles/wars: Hungarian Revolution of 1848; Battle of Alisbrunn; Battle of Lagerdorf; Battle of Szolnok; Battle of Tápióbicske; Battle of Isaszeg; First Battle of Vác; Battle of Nagysalló

János Damjanich (Serbian: Јован Дамјанић, romanized: Jovan Damjanić; 8 December 1804 – 6 October 1849) was an Austrian military officer who became general of the Hungarian Revolutionary Army in 1848. He is considered a national hero in Hungary.

Damjanich is one of the few generals who never lost a single battle.

== Early life ==
Damjanich was born in Serbian family in Staza in Croatian Military Frontier (now part of Sunja, Croatia). His father was a major in the Austrian Army. His mother was a daughter of general Taborović. His wife Emilija Čarnić was related to the Čarnojević family.

According to Croatian sources, because Staza is mainly a Croatian village with little to no Serbian population, Damjanich was born into the Greek Catholic Church, while others claim that he was Serbian Orthodox by birth. Other sources claim that he was actually born in Straža, near Vršac, in the Banat Military Frontier. However, this is very unlikely, since there was no Damjanich family in Straža.

== Military career ==
Damjanich entered the army as an officer in the 61st regiment, and on the outbreak of the Hungarian Revolution of 1848 was promoted to be a major in the 3rd Honvéd battalion at Szeged. Although an Orthodox Serb, he was from the beginning a devoted adherent of the Hungarian liberals.

His ability and valour at the battles of Alibunár (Serbian: Alibunar, German: Alisbrunn) and Temesőr (German: Lagerdorf, where, as a reprisal, almost the village's entire population was executed, along with their domestic animals) in 1848 led to his promotion to colonel. At the beginning of the Hungarian revolutionary war, he ordered the execution of 200 young Serbs in Szeged, to intimidate the Serbian nationalists. In early 1849, he was appointed commander of the 3rd Army Corps in the middle Tisza, and quickly gained the reputation of being the bravest man in the Hungarian army. In March 1849 he annihilated an Austrian brigade at Szolnok, which was perhaps his greatest exploit.

He was elected deputy for Szolnok to the Diet of Hungary, but declined the honour. Damjanich played a leading role in the general advance upon the Hungarian capital of Buda under Artúr Görgey.

The engagements of Hort and Hatvan, along with the bloody Isaszeg turned Damjanich into a national hero. At the ensuing review at Gödöllő, Lajos Kossuth expressed the sentiments of the whole nation when he doffed his hat as Damjanich's battalions passed by. Damjanich uncompromisingly supported the views of Kossuth, and was appointed commander of one of the three divisions which, under Görgey, liberated Vác in April 1849. His fame reached its height when, on April 19, he won the Battle of Nagysalló, which led to the relief of the fortress of Komárom.

At this juncture Damjanich broke his leg, an accident which prevented him from taking part in field operations at the most critical period of the war, when the Hungarians had to abandon the capital for the second time. He recovered sufficiently, however, to accept the post of commandant of the fortress of Arad.

After the Surrender at Világos (now Șiria, Romania), Damjanich, on being summoned to surrender, declared he would give up the fortress to a single company of Cossacks, but would defend it to the last drop of his blood against the whole Austrian army. He accordingly surrendered to the Russian general Dmitry Buturlin, by whom he was handed over to the Austrians and imprisoned. During his prison time he converted to Roman Catholicism and had a Holy Confession. He became one of the 13 Martyrs of Arad on 6 October 1849. Damjanich was last in the line to be executed because his enemies wanted him to watch hanging of his generals. His famous last words were: I believed I would be the last, because I was always the first in battle. My poor Emily! Long live Hungary!

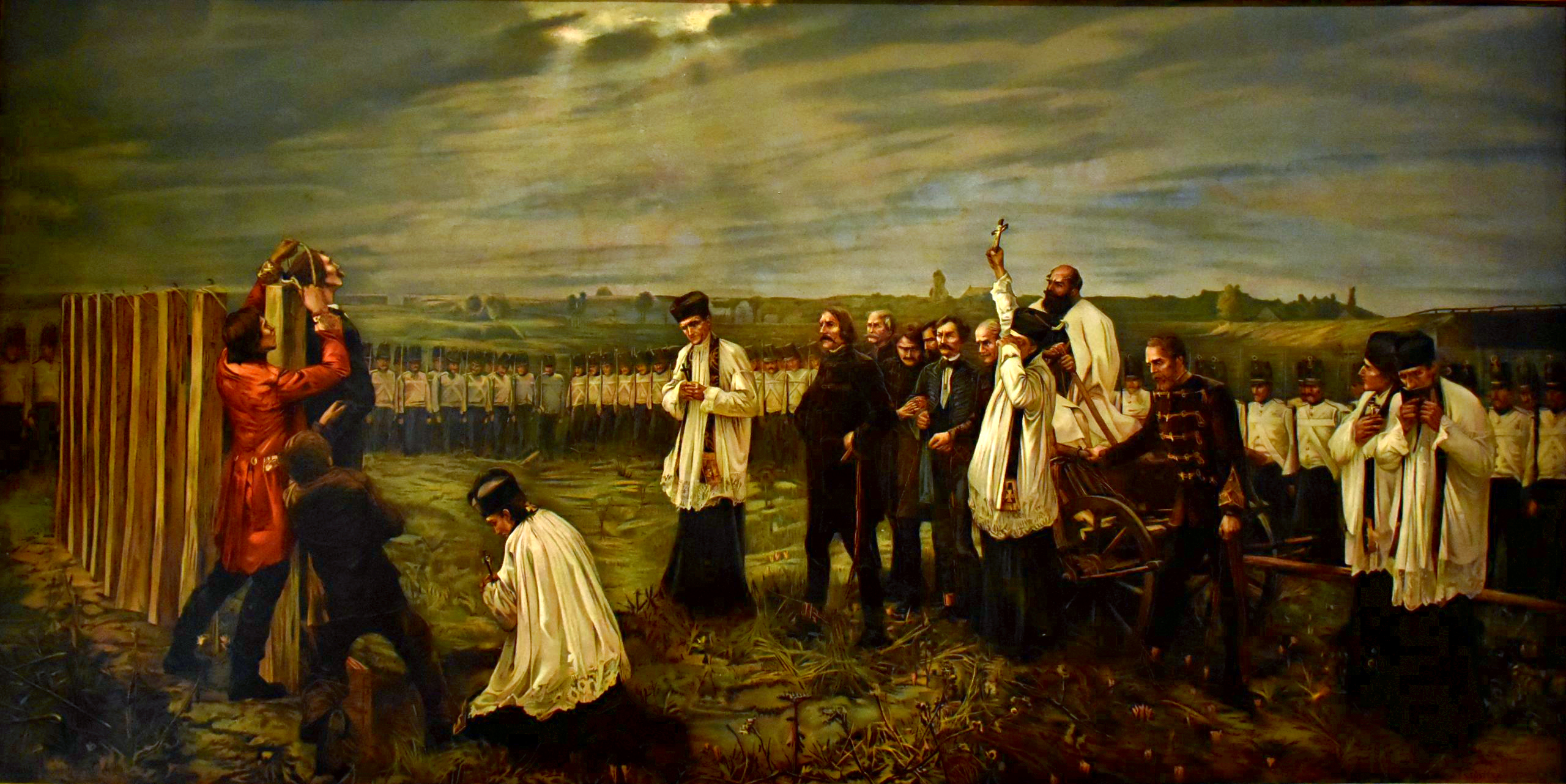
Execution of the Martyrs of Arad. Work by János Thorma.

He was buried initially in Mácsa (present-day Macea, Romania), but his remains were reburied in 1974 at the Martyrs' Memorial in Arad. A cenotaph dedicated to him still exists in Macea.

== Legacy ==
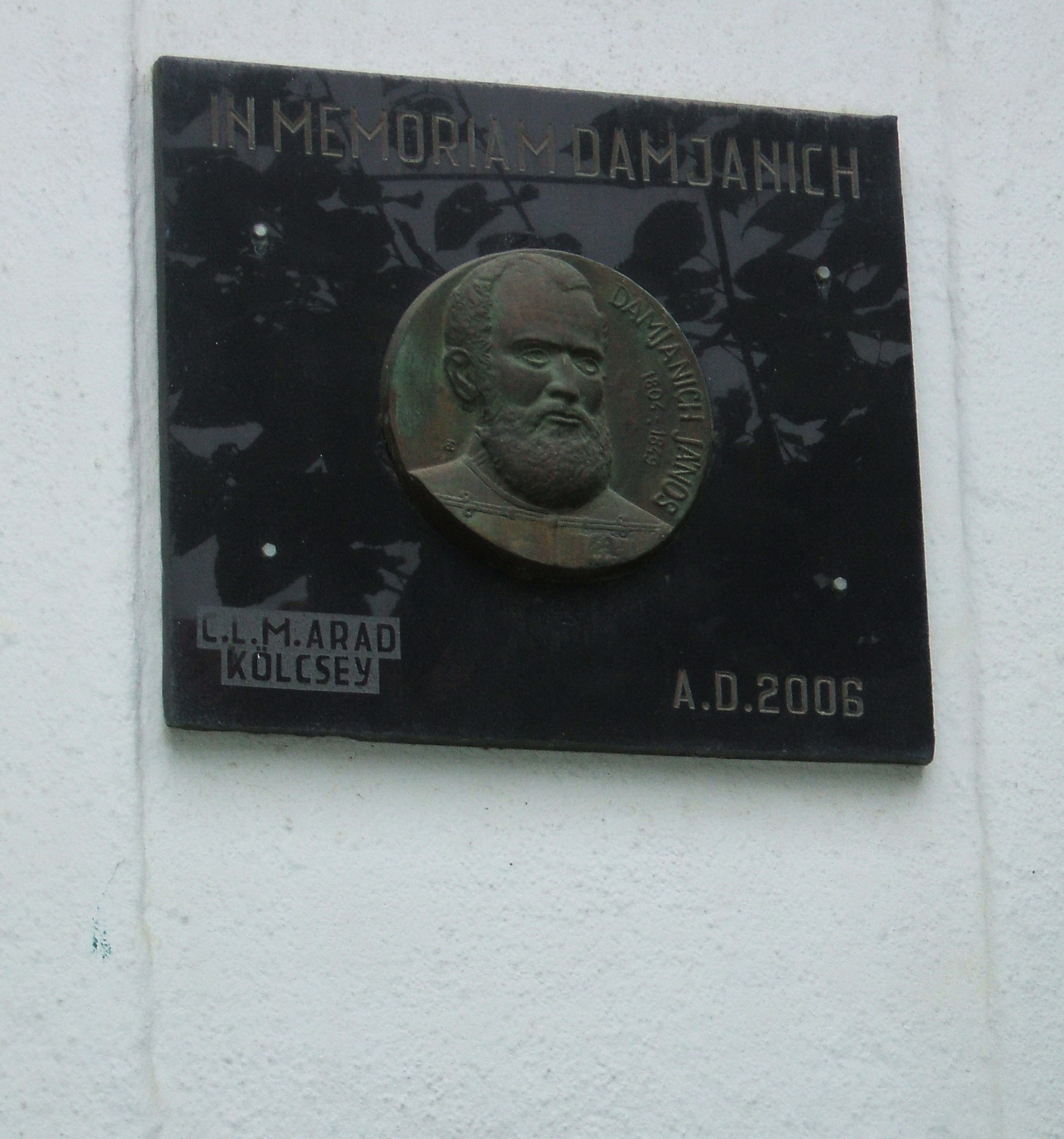
Memorial plaque at Damjanich's house in Arad

Damjanich is a controversial historical figure. Hungarians consider Damjanich a national hero who led the Hungarian revolutionary army against the Habsburg Monarchy, while Serbs normally consider him a national traitor, who despite the fact that he was ethnic Serb by origin, fought on the Hungarian side against his own people, i.e. against the Vojvodinian Serb army that was on the side of the Habsburgs during the revolution. Therefore, the Serbs gave him a nickname "ljuta guja, srpski izdajica" ("furious snake, Serbian traitor"). The following Anti-Serb quote inciting Genocide of Serbs is accredited to him,

"Serbs shouldn't exist; I won't be still until the last Serb on this earth is dead and once that is done, I shall kill myself."

Other sources say that Damjanich was actually proud of his Serb origin.
