= Lajos Aulich =

Hungarian general

General Lajos Aulich
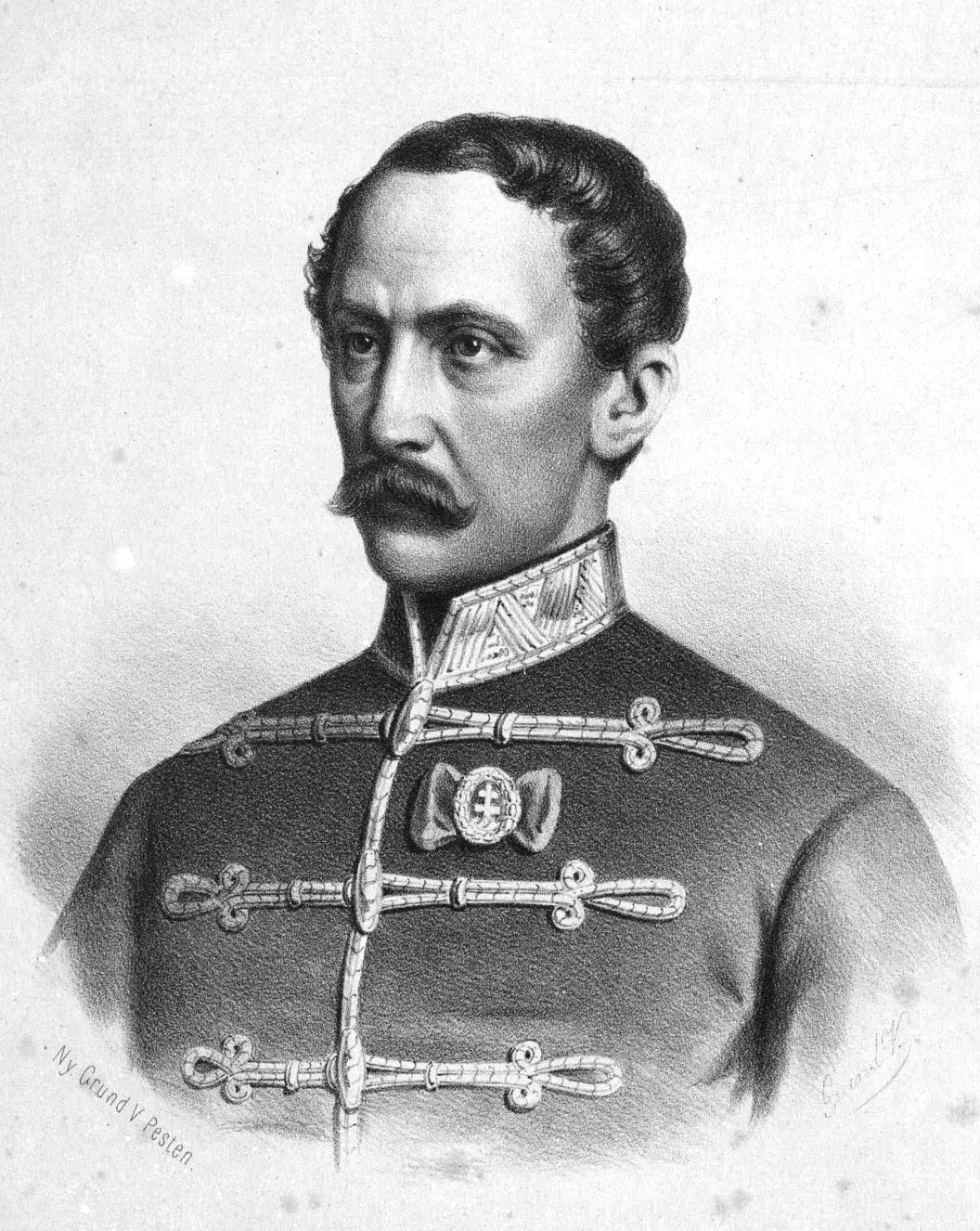
- Aulich as depicted by Vince Grimm

Minister of War of the Hungarian State
- In office 14 July 1849 – 11 August 1849
- Prime Minister: Bertalan Szemere
- Preceded by: Artúr Görgei
- Succeeded by: Revolution suppressed

Personal details
- Born: 25 August 1793 Pozsony, Kingdom of Hungary (now Bratislava, Slovakia)
- Died: 6 October 1849 (aged 56) Arad, Kingdom of Hungary
- Cause of death: Execution by hanging
- Known for: The 13 Martyrs of Arad

Military service
- Allegiance: Hungarian Revolutionary Army
- Years of service: 1812–1849
- Rank: Major general
- Battles/wars: Napoleonic Wars; Russian campaign; Hungarian Revolution of 1848; Battle of Kápolna

Lajos Aulich (15 May 1792 – 6 October 1849) was the third Minister of War of the Hungarian State.

Originally a professional soldier and lieutenant colonel in the Austrian Army, during the Hungarian Revolution of 1848 however, he sided with the revolutionaries.

During the Spring Campaign, Aulich commanded an army, which gathered and prepared for the great Battle of Isaszeg.

He became a honvédség (Hungarian Army) colonel on 2 October 1848, and was named General at the Battle of Kápolna. He was a stickler for the rules: when Lajos Kossuth sent him requests, he answered: "please work through Görgey." Due to his gout, he was relieved of field duty and appointed Minister of War on 14 July 1849. He was executed less than three months later as one of the 13 Martyrs of Arad.

Political offices
Preceded by Artúr Görgey	Minister of War; 1849	Succeeded by (Last office holder); Julius Jacob von Haynau
