= József Schweidel =

Hungarian general

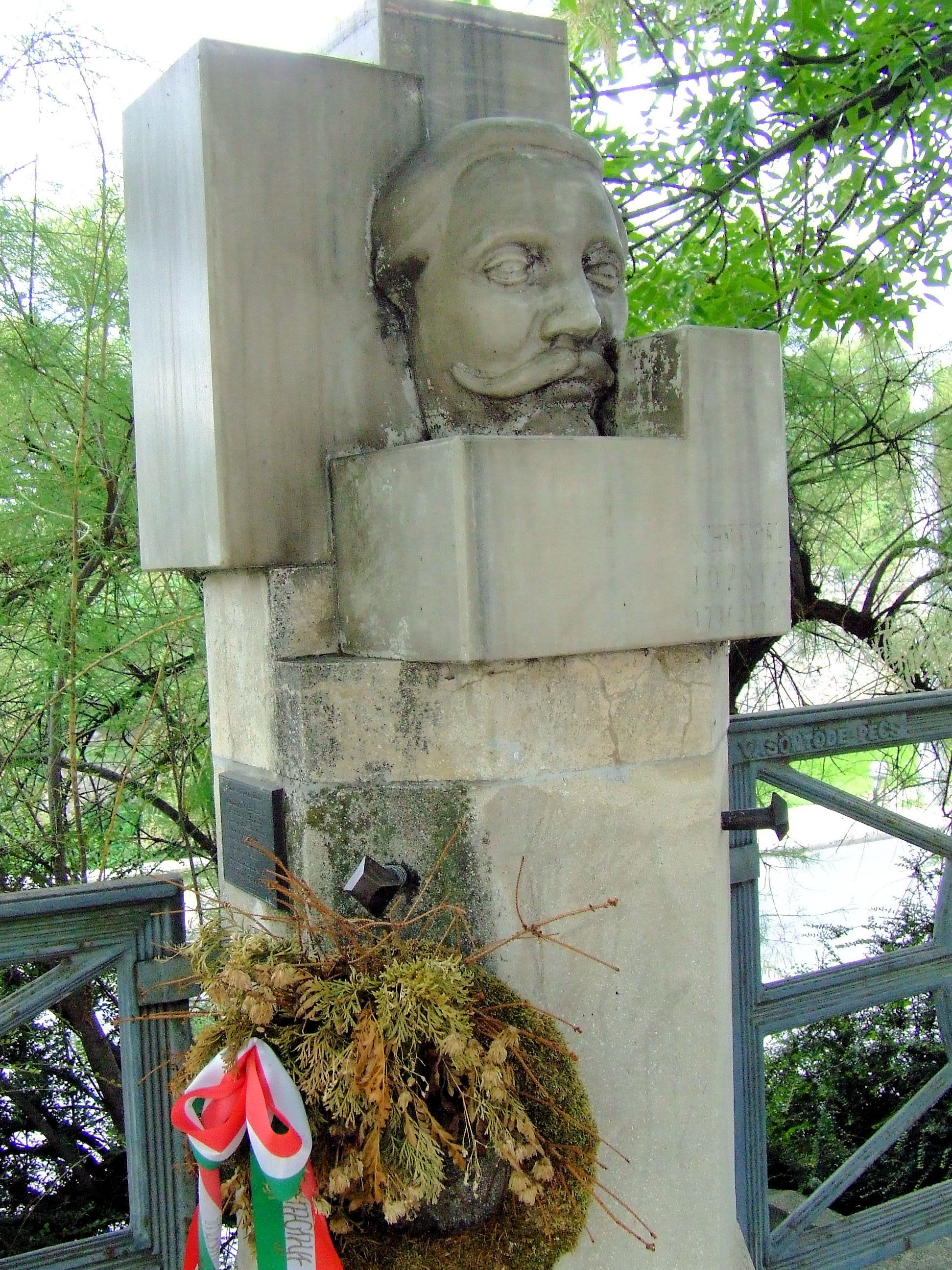
Sculpture of Schweidel

József Schweidel (German: Joseph Schweidel; 18 May 1796 – 6 October 1849) was a honvéd general in the Hungarian Army. He was executed for his part in the Hungarian Revolution of 1848, and is considered one of the 13 Martyrs of Arad.

== Life ==
He began his military career in the Austrian Imperial Army in the 4th hussar regiment as a cadet, and eventually as a captain. His mentor was József Simonyi (known as the famous "Simonyi óbester"). He fought in the Napoleonic Wars, there in inner Alia, and at the Battle of Paris as well.

When the Revolution of 1848 broke out, he headed home from Vienna. When he returned he was reviewed by a board of judges in Hungary. His military ranking rose rapidly, first appointed to colonel, and after the battle of Schwechat where he was cited for bravery by the National Defense Committee, he was commissioned as general on 28 October 1848. On 9 May 1849 he became the commander of the Pest defense. Then after the advance of the Russian army he ordered a surrender.

== Death ==
After being turned over to Austrian authorities, he pleaded that he and the others be executed not by hanging but by firing squad, seen as more honourable. This was initially denied for him and he was sentenced to death by hanging. However, after pleas by his wife, his sentence was amended to be death by firing squad. He was in the fourth group to be executed.

Before his death he signed over his will to his wife on three sheets of paper, stating all his possessions were now hers "unless she should die of grief".

His wife, Bilinska (Bilinszka) Domicella, was of Polish descent (died Budapest, 23 March 1888 at 84 years old) married him in 1827, and bore him five children, including Béla Schweidel (†1916), who also participated in the struggle for freedom and was later detained in the dungeons of Arad, but was later released.
