= Fortress of Arad =

Fortress in Arad, Romania

Arad fortress
- Cetatea Aradului
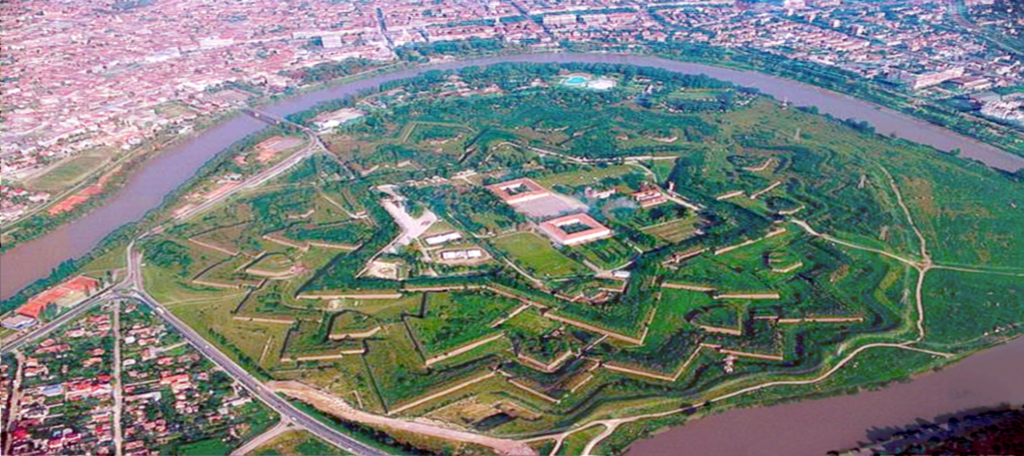
- Air view of the hexagram-shaped fortress,
- Interactive map of Arad fortress
- Location: Arad, Romania
- Designer: Ferdinand Philipp von Harsch
- Type: Fortification
- Beginning date: 1763
- Completion date: 1783

Monument istoric
- Official name: Ansamblul cetății Aradului
- Designated: 2004
- Reference no.: AR-II-a-A-00475

Site information
- Controlled by: Romanian Land Forces

Location
- Coordinates: 46°10′16″N 21°19′55″E

Garrison information
- Garrison: 191st Infantry Battalion

The Fortress of Arad is a fortification system built in the city of Arad (today Romania) in Kingdom of Hungary, on the left bank of the Mureș River in the 18th century at the direct order of the Habsburg Queen Maria Theresa. The fortress today lies in the city's Subcetate neighbourhood, on the former military border between the Habsburg Empire and the Ottoman Empire. Over the course of its existence, it has been used as a military garrison and a military prison. It is the headquarters of the Romanian 191st Infantry Battalion which became part of the Mixed Romanian-Hungarian Battalion in 1999.

== Building of the fortress ==
Following the victories of the Holy League at the Battle of Vienna and the Habsburg victory at the second Battle of Mohács the city of Arad has been freed from Ottoman rule. After the Treaty of Karlowitz, the entire city of Arad was on the border region of the Habsburg Empire and so, of critical importance for the Viennese Court as it became a focal point of the Military Frontier administration until 1751. The strategic placement of the city determined Prince Eugene of Savoy, to rebuild and improve the former rectangular Turkish built fortress, on the right bank of the river, but after consultations with the Empress, the decision was made not to rebuild the old citadel, but to erect a new and vastly improved fortified complex on the peninsula lying just south of the city. Construction lasted from 1763 to 1783, the building efforts were done with thousands of prisoners and with costs of 3 million florins.

== Architecture ==
The project was made after the plans of the Austrian general and architect Ferdinand Philipp von Harsch. Inside the fortress, there is a Catholic church, and in the surrounding church buildings were housed Franciscan friars, under the patronage of St. John of Capistrano. The last four monks lived in the fortress until 1861 when the church was transformed into a military hospital. Today the church and adjacent buildings are more or less in a derelict state.

The bastion fortress was built in the Vauban style. It had the form of a star with six corners, built with three rows of 3 m (9.8 ft)-thick brick walls which were filled with earth and featured casemates and underground bunkers. The fortress also had several trenches which could be flooded. Overall, the fortress was surrounded by a moat filled with water from the Mureș river which was bordered outwardly by an earth glacis. The circumference of the walls measured 3,180 m (10,430 ft). The relatively long curtain walls were laid in a tenaille system. The fortress featured six bastions which totaled 296 gunholes. These were flanked by lunettes and ravelins. The main entrance gate and buildings inside the fortress were built in the Baroque style. The inside barracks could usually accommodate 2,940 soldiers, this number could however go up to 4,030.

== History ==
After its completion, the fortress was a part of the inner system of fortifications that protected the outer regions of the empire, for possible conflicts in the area, as with the Oradea and Timișoara fortifications. Starting in 1794, the fortress was used as a military prison, where 1,200 French soldiers were imprisoned. During the 1848–1849 Hungarian Revolution, the fortress played a key role as it was besieged by the Hungarian Republican army for nine months until it was finally occupied in June 1849. After only 46 days, the Habsburg army moved back into the fortress and used it partly as a military prison for more than 500 officers. Most of the prisoners were sentenced to death. Among them were the 13 Generals of the Republican Army that were executed on 6 October, outside the outer east walls of the fortress, and today are considered martyrs. In 1852, Emperor Franz Joseph I visited the fort and ordered some pardons. One of the most important prisoners who was imprisoned in the fortress was the Romanian revolutionary Eftimie Murgu.

During World War I, thousands of Serb soldiers and civilians from Bosnia-Herzegovina were placed in detention here in an improvised camp outside the fort. Out of the entire number of persons imprisoned here, 4,317 died as a result of typhus and maltreatment. They were buried in several mass graves in the Pomenirea Cemetery. A plaque has been placed at the entrance of the fortress in their honor.

The most famous prisoner in the fortress of Arad was undoubtedly Gavrilo Princip, who on 28 June 1914 killed the heir to the throne of Austria-Hungary, Archduke Franz Ferdinand and his wife, Sophie, in Sarajevo, an event which led to the outbreak of World War I. In an interpellation to the Hungarian parliament in Budapest during 1917, Ștefan Cicio Pop, deputy of the Romanian National Party, warned about the inhumane conditions in which prisoners were held in the fortress of Arad.

191st Battalion badge

Hungarian–Romanian battalion badge

After the First World War, the fortress was occupied by allied Serbian and French troops under French command, until July 1919 when it was handed over to the Romanian Army. In the interwar period, the fortress was a garrison of the 93rd Infantry Regiment of the 1st Romanian Infantry Division. After the armistice between Romania and the Soviet Union, signed in Moscow on 12 September 1944, the city and the Arad Garrison were occupied by the Soviet Red Army. The city garrison remained a Soviet tank unit until 1958 when the Red Army retreated, leaving way to the Romanian Army. Currently the fortress is the headquarters of the Romanian 191st Infantry Battalion "Colonel Radu Golescu" and is hosting a mixed Hungarian–Romanian mixed peacekeeping battalion since 1999.
