= Arisztid Dessewffy =

Hungarian general

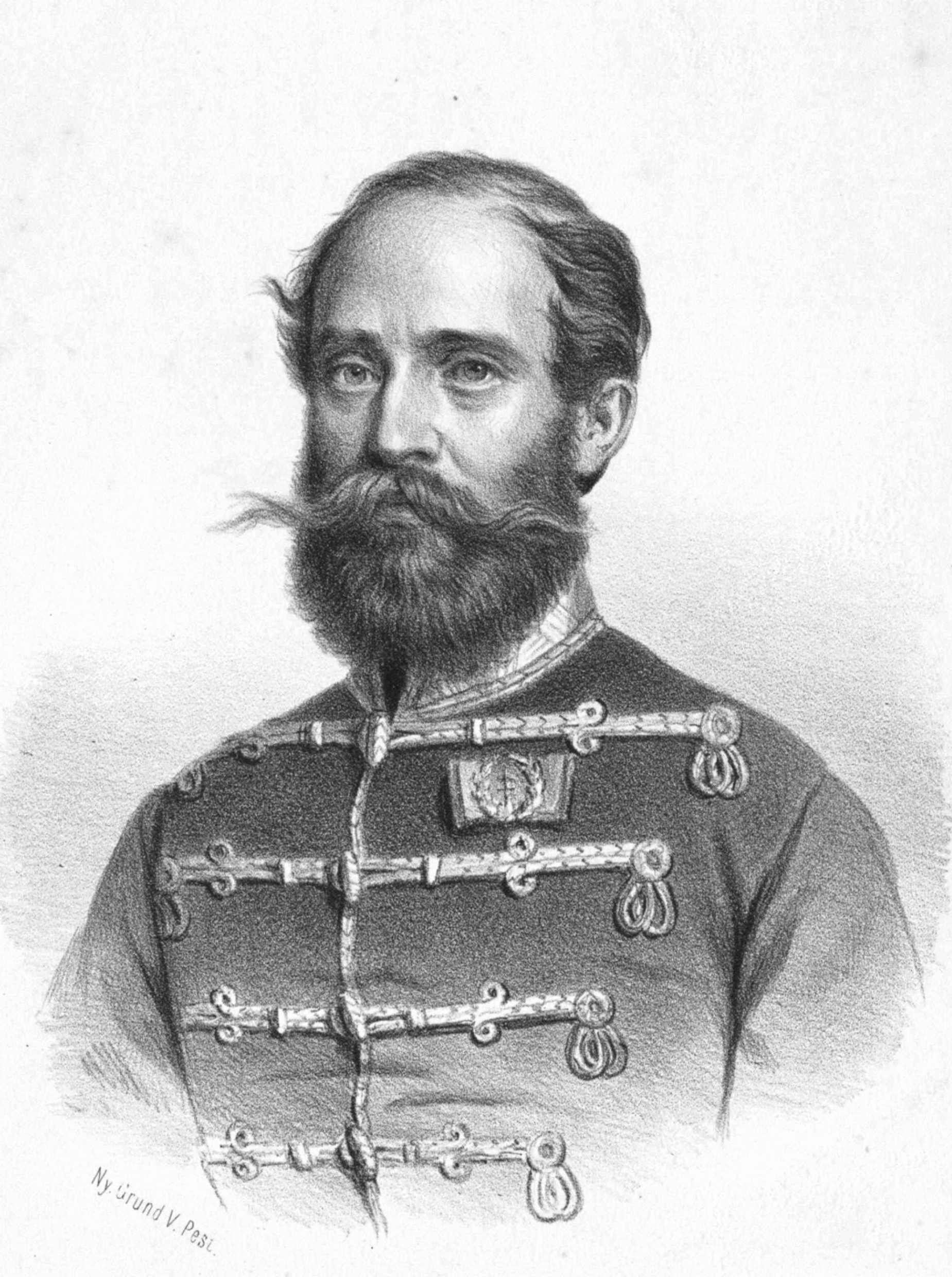
Arisztid Dessewffy.

Arisztid Dessewffy de Csernek et Tarkő (Hungarian: [ˈɒristid ˈdɛʒøːfi]; 2 July 1802 – 6 October 1849) was a general in the Hungarian Honvéd Army during the Revolution and War of Independence of 1848–1849. A member of the Hungarian nobility, he served with distinction in several campaigns against both Austrian and Russian forces. Dessewffy commanded an army of roughly 100,000 men but eventually surrendered in the face of overwhelming Russian superiority, an act that spared his troops from unnecessary bloodshed.

Following the defeat of the Hungarian forces, he was tried and executed for his role in the revolution. Dessewffy is remembered as one of the Thirteen Martyrs of Arad, national heroes who became symbols of Hungary’s struggle for freedom.

On the night before his execution, witnesses reported that he slept peacefully, showing no fear of his approaching death. At dawn, around 4 a.m., he faced a firing squad alongside two fellow officers. Their deaths were somewhat less brutal than originally planned: Prince Franz de Paula of Liechtenstein intervened at the last moment to have them executed by shooting rather than by hanging—a form of punishment then regarded as a public disgrace.

== Life ==
He was born into the wealthy Hungarian, evangelical Abaúj family. He graduated high school in Kassa (Košice) and Eperjes (Prešov) and, at 18, applied to the Imperial Army 5th (Radetzky) hussar regiment cadets. Over a long period of peace after the Napoleonic Wars he served in the fifth Artillery corps of miners and the fifth hussar regiment. However, he did not favor a military career, and thus in 1839 at the rank of captain, decommissioned, got married and began farming in Eperjes. His wife and children all died before the revolution.

After the 1848 revolution broke out, he entered military service again on 22 September as a major in the National Guard and was involved in organizing the Saros county militia. On 26 November he was promoted to Lieutenant Colonel and Brigade Commander of the Upper Tisza Corps.

He took part in 11 December battle and was in the engagement. On 4 January 1849, at the battle of Kassa he was commended for his valour and perseverance in leading his troops against General Schlik with minimal losses. He participated in the reorganization of the Upper Tisza Corps and victoriously fought against the Schleicher Corps. On 14 February he was promoted to colonel. On 18 February, commanding a small cavalry force, he defeated an Imperial detachment. He distinguished himself in this battle, and the battle of the spring campaign, for which he received the Hungarian Order of Military Merit III on 18 April, and on 30 April was appointed commander of the I Corps cavalry division. The Corps was present at the siege of Budapest. On 2 June he was given command of the IX Corps, and also received the appointment of major general.

On 5 July, he married a second time, to Emma Szinnyei Merse. Beginning in July, he was tasked as the top cavalry commander to hinder the advance of the Russian army. The cavalry were heavily engaged in the 20 July Tura battle. became corps commander. He took part in the 5 August Szőreg battle then again in the 9 August Timișoara battle. He handed over command of the army on 16 August to Colonel William Lazarus.

== Death ==
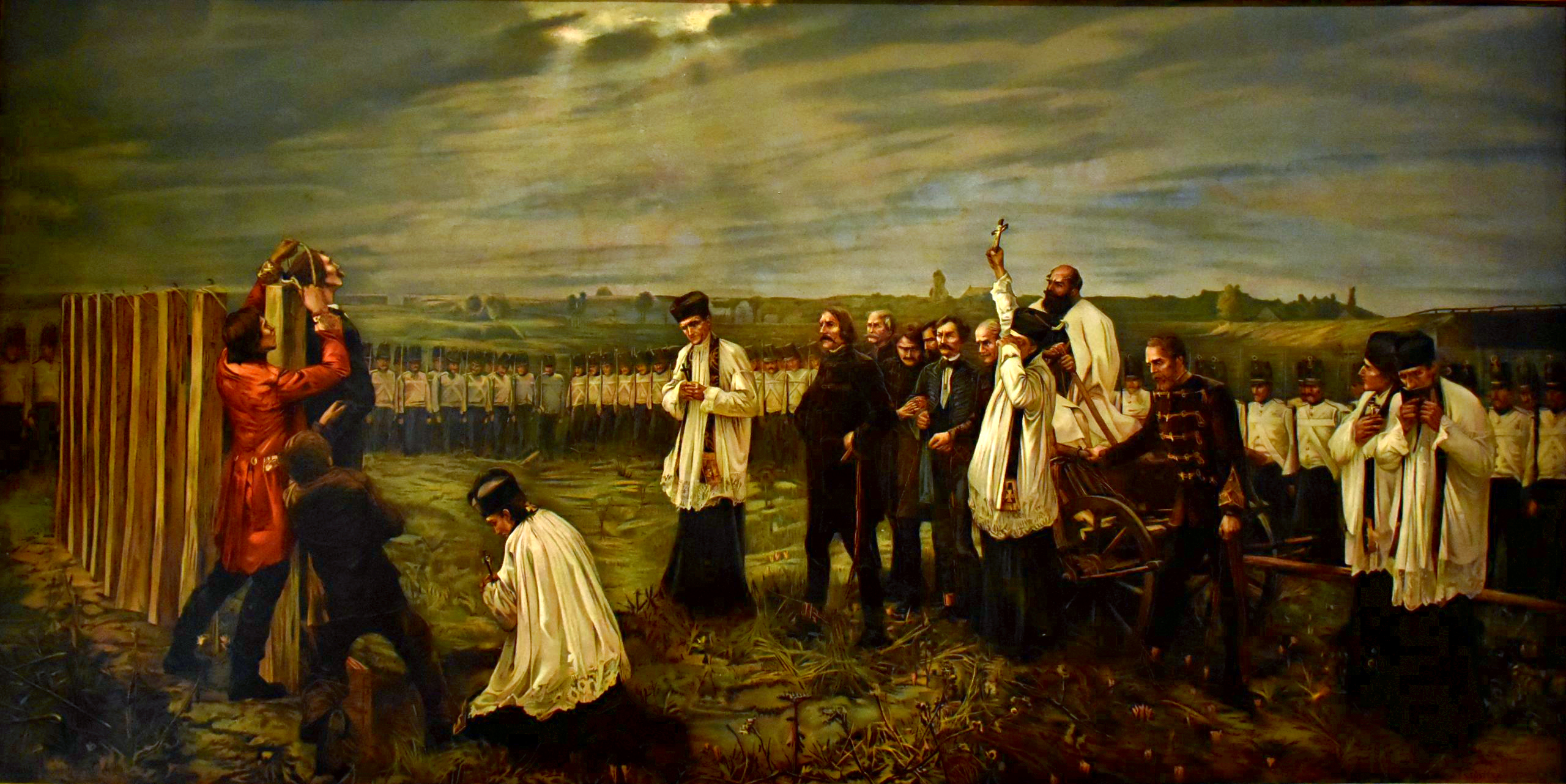
Execution of the Martyrs of Arad. Work by János Thorma.

After the final defeat and surrounding of the army, he had the opportunity to escape to Turkey, but one of his comrades, a Lieutenant-General, encouraged by Prince Franz von Liechtenstein, on 19 August next to Karánsebes laid down their arms before the Imperial troops. They were given terms that the soldiers would be spared but the officers would be subject to military discipline. General Liechtenstein later pleaded to his comrades at the military court to spare the lives of most, but to no avail; the Arad military court sentenced him to death by hanging. However the prince was able to convince the court to execute them by firing squad, which was seen as less of an insult since it was a military death rather than a criminal one. He was executed in the second group of four in front of a firing squad.

The executed were buried around the Arad castle. His body was later exhumed by his family and moved from the castle in secret. His body has been resting at the Margonyai estate since 1850.
