= János Thorma =

Hungarian painter (1870–1937)

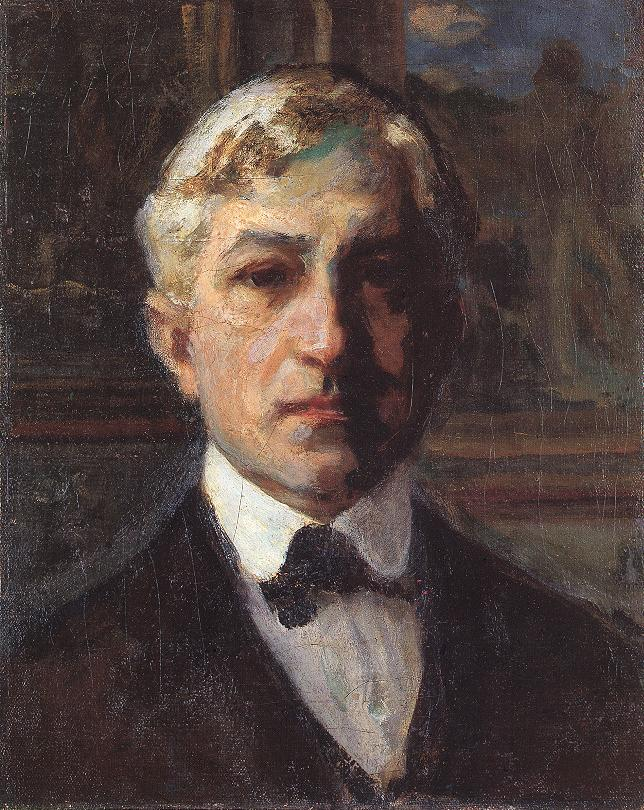
Self-portrait, ca. 1910

János Thorma (24 April 1870 – 5 December 1937) was a Hungarian painter. A representative figure of the Nagybánya artists' colony, which started in 1896, in Nagybánya, Austria-Hungary (today Baia Mare, Romania), he moved through different styles, shifted from the naturalism that was the aesthetic of the colony, to historical subjects, to romantic realism and to a Post-Impressionism style. His work is held by the Hungarian National Gallery, the Thorma János Múzeum, regional museums and private collectors.

In 1966, the Hungarian National Gallery held a major commemorative exhibition, The Art of Nagybánya, commemorating the innovations of Thorma and fellow artists. In February 2013, it opens a major retrospective of more than 100 pieces of János Thorma's work, drawing from numerous institutions and private collectors in Europe.

== Early life and education ==
János Thorma was born in 1870 in Kiskunhalas, Austria-Hungary to Béla Thorma, a tax agency cashier, and his wife Gizella Fekete. The family moved to Nagybánya when the youth was 14. He began to study art at Bertalan Székely's drawing school.

At the age of 18, he went to Munich, where he studied from 1888 to 1890 under the Hungarian painter, Simon Hollósy, who held free classes. Following a path similar to other young artists from Austria-Hungary, in 1891 and 1893–95, Thorma also went to Paris, where he studied at the Académie Julian.

== Career ==
His first significant painting, Szenvedők (The Bereaved), was exhibited at the Budapest Art Gallery, then at the Paris Salon in 1894. In 1896, on the occasion of the millennium of the Magyars' conquest of Pannonia, he presented his painting about The 13 Martyrs of Arad, Aradi vértanúk (The Martyrs of Arad), which gained him nationwide renown in Hungary. Many of his early works were large canvases on historical themes.

In 1896 he was one of the founders of the Nagybánya artists' colony, whose members included Simon Hollósy, Károly Ferenczy, and István Réti, who achieved international recognition. From 1902–27, he was a teacher at the Nagybánya Painters' Association, becoming its president in 1917.

In 1898 Thorma began to paint Talpra magyar! (Rise up, Hungarian!), on which he worked intermittently almost to his death.

His first paintings were naturalistic, and an early inspiration was Jules Bastien-Lepage. Thorma used the artist's most popular work, the Portrait of Sarah Bernhardt, in 1892 as a model in his own painting of Irén Biltz. Thorma's painting had the characteristic atmosphere of Art Nouveau.

As a young man, Thorma felt that naturalism offered him too little to achieve his goals as a painter, and he was inspired by German romanticism (as shown in his The Bereaved, 1892) and French classicism (The Martyrs of Arad, 1893–94). In 1897, following a long trip to Western Europe, Thorma painted several Biblical subjects, including Békesség veletek – "Pax vobiscum", which show the influence of Rembrandt.

After 1900, Thorma's work turned toward realism: Kocsisok között (Among the Coachmen) (1902); Október elsején (On the First of October) (1903); Kártyázók (The Card-Players, 1904). In 1906-07 he showed influence from Spanish sources in his Cigányutca (The Gypsies' Street, 1907). He also was inspired by the French painter, Paul Gauguin, as shown in Húsvéti kenyérszentelés (The Blessing of the Bread) and Templombamenők (People Going toward Church), both ca. 1910.

In 1918 he took his historical works to Hungary, as he expected Romania to be invaded at the end of World War I. He stored them in Debrecen.

After the Treaty of Trianon (4 June 1920), when the Nagybánya region was incorporated to the Kingdom of Romania, only Thorma remained in the town; the other Hungarian painters left. The government encouraged him to continue the naturalistic "official Nagybánya school", although his own work had developed in quite different ways.

After 1920 Thorma developed his own en plein air style, based on his substantial knowledge of painting. He used certain elements of neo-classicism in such works as Tavasz (Spring, 1920) and Fürdés után (After Bathing, 1928). In the last decade of his life, he painted impressionistic landscapes and portraits.

In September 1929, Thorma, aged 59 and until then a bachelor, married Margit Kiss, a painting disciple and distant relative. He died in Baia Mare eight years later.

Since the late twentieth century, and the opening of the Eastern Bloc, there has been renewed attention given to the innovations of the Naybánya artists. In collaboration with other institutions, the Hungarian National Gallery has organized a major retrospective of Thorma's work, consisting of more than 100 pieces. Its title classifies him as a representative painter of the Barbizon school in Hungary. The exhibit opens in February 2013, through the collaboration of the "Art Museum in Nagybánya, the Janus Pannonius Museum in Pécs, the Móra Ferenc Museum in Szeged, the Déri Museum in Debrecen, the Herman Ottó Museum in Miskolc, the Katona József Museum in Kecskemét, and the Thorma János Museum in Kiskunhalas, as well as Hungarian, German and Romanian private collectors".

== Exhibits ==
- 2009, Munich in Hungarian, Hungarian Artists in Munich 1850-1914, 2 Oct 2009 – Jan 2010, Hungarian National Gallery

== Legacy and honors ==
- 2013, János Thorma, the Painter of the Hungarian Barbizon, 8 February – 19 May 2013, Hungarian National Gallery.
- 1966, The Art of Nagybánya. Centennial Exhibition in Celebration of the Artists' Colony in Nagybánya.
- The Thorma János Múzeum was established for his work in his home town of Kiskunhalas, Hungary.

== See also ==
- Simon Hollósy
- Károly Ferenczy
- István Réti

== Works ==
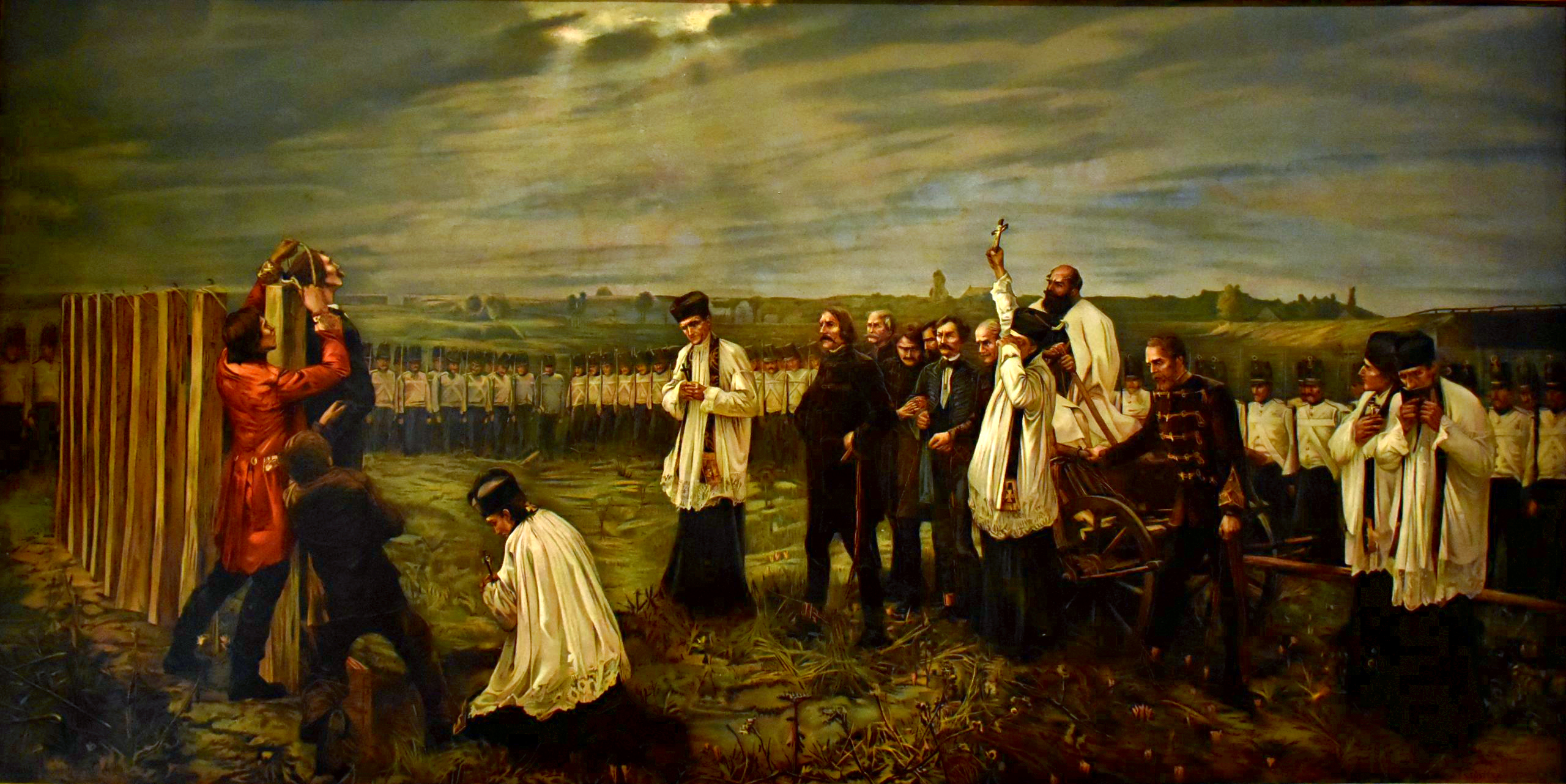
The 13 Martyrs of Arad, the Sixth of October

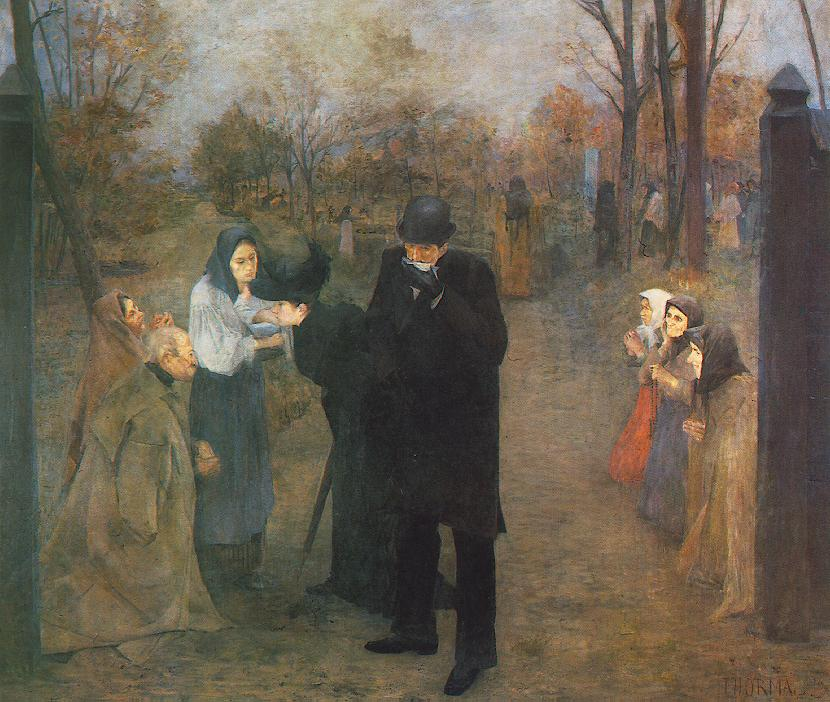
The Bereaved (1892)

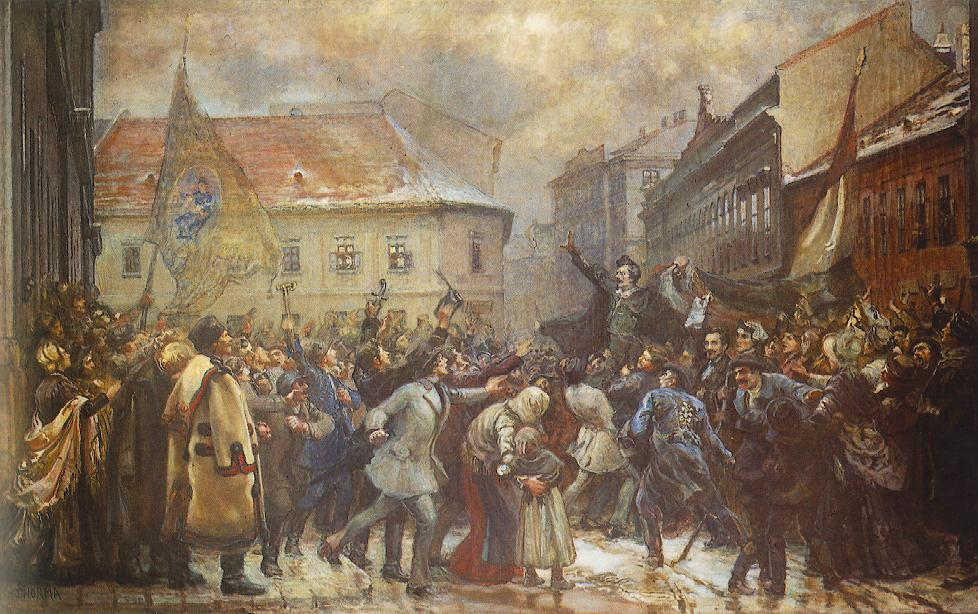
Rise up, Hungarian! (1870–1937)

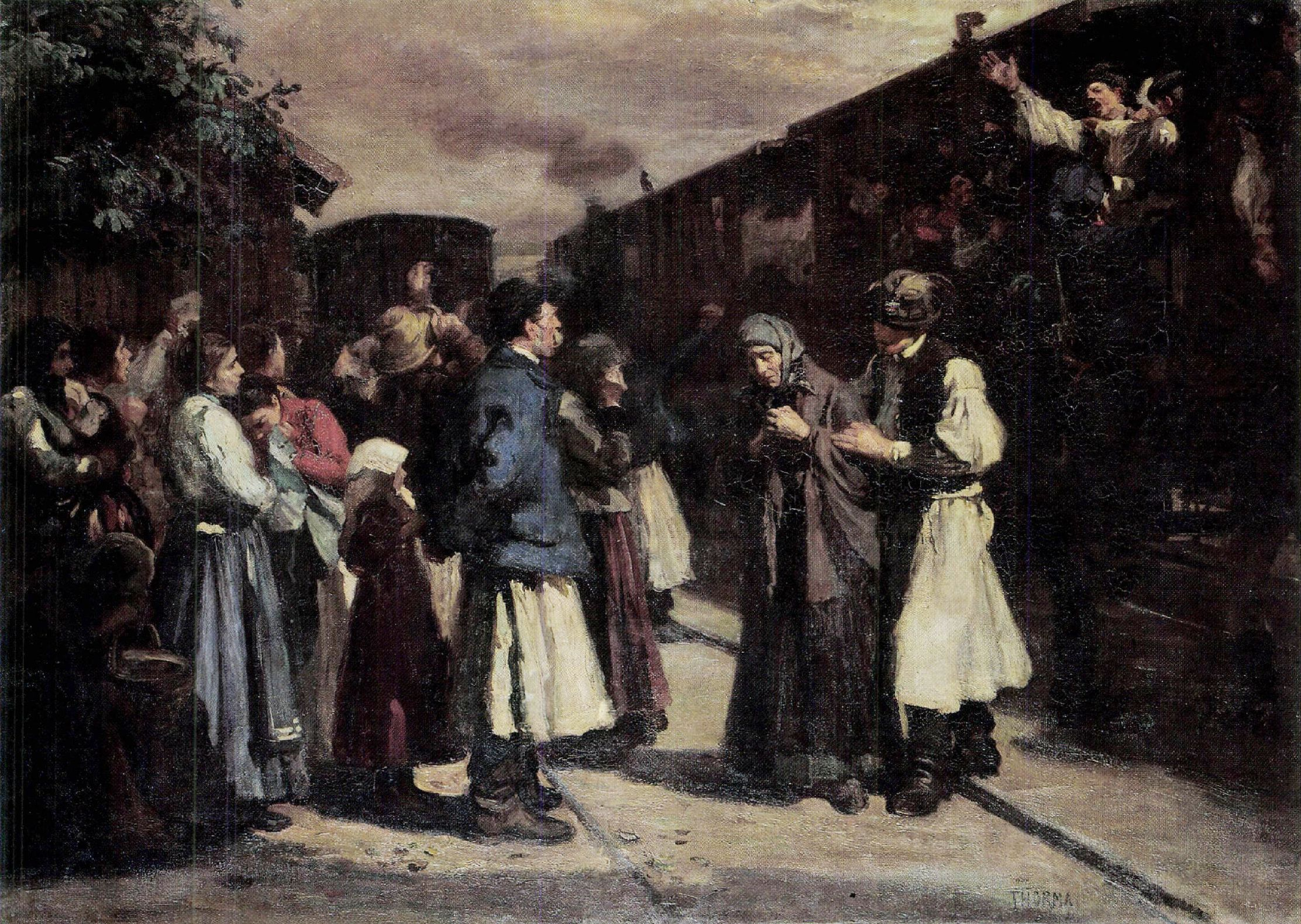
The First of October (1903)

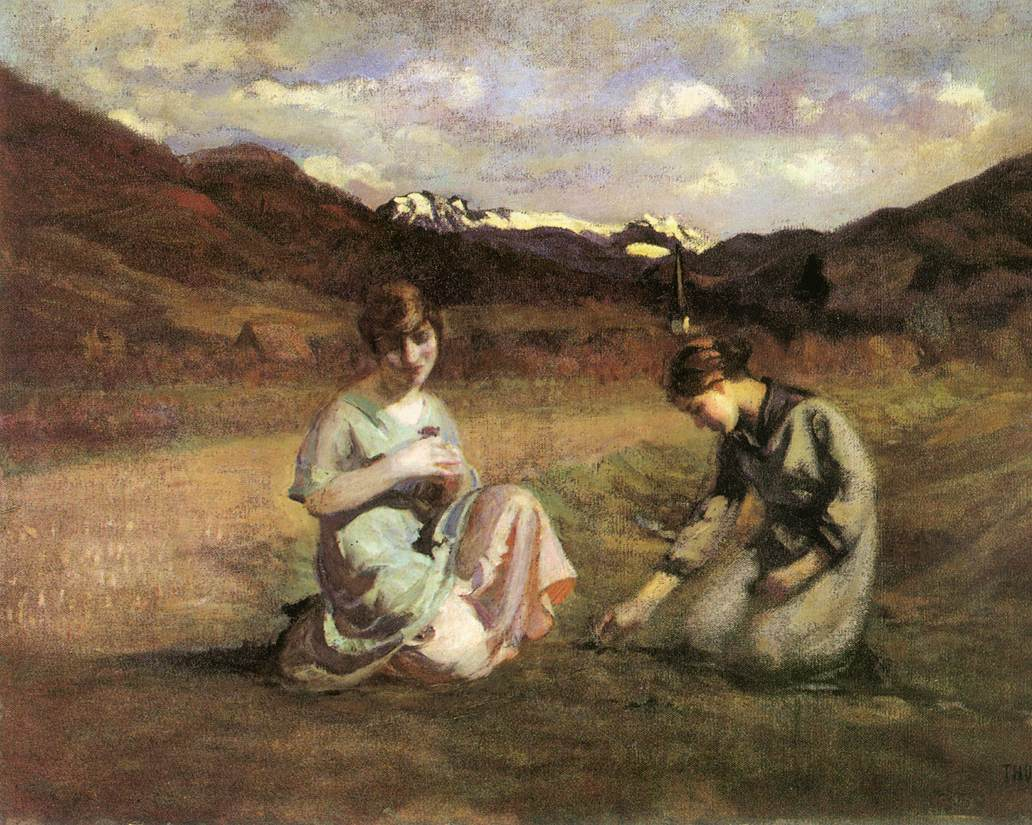
Picking Violets (1920)

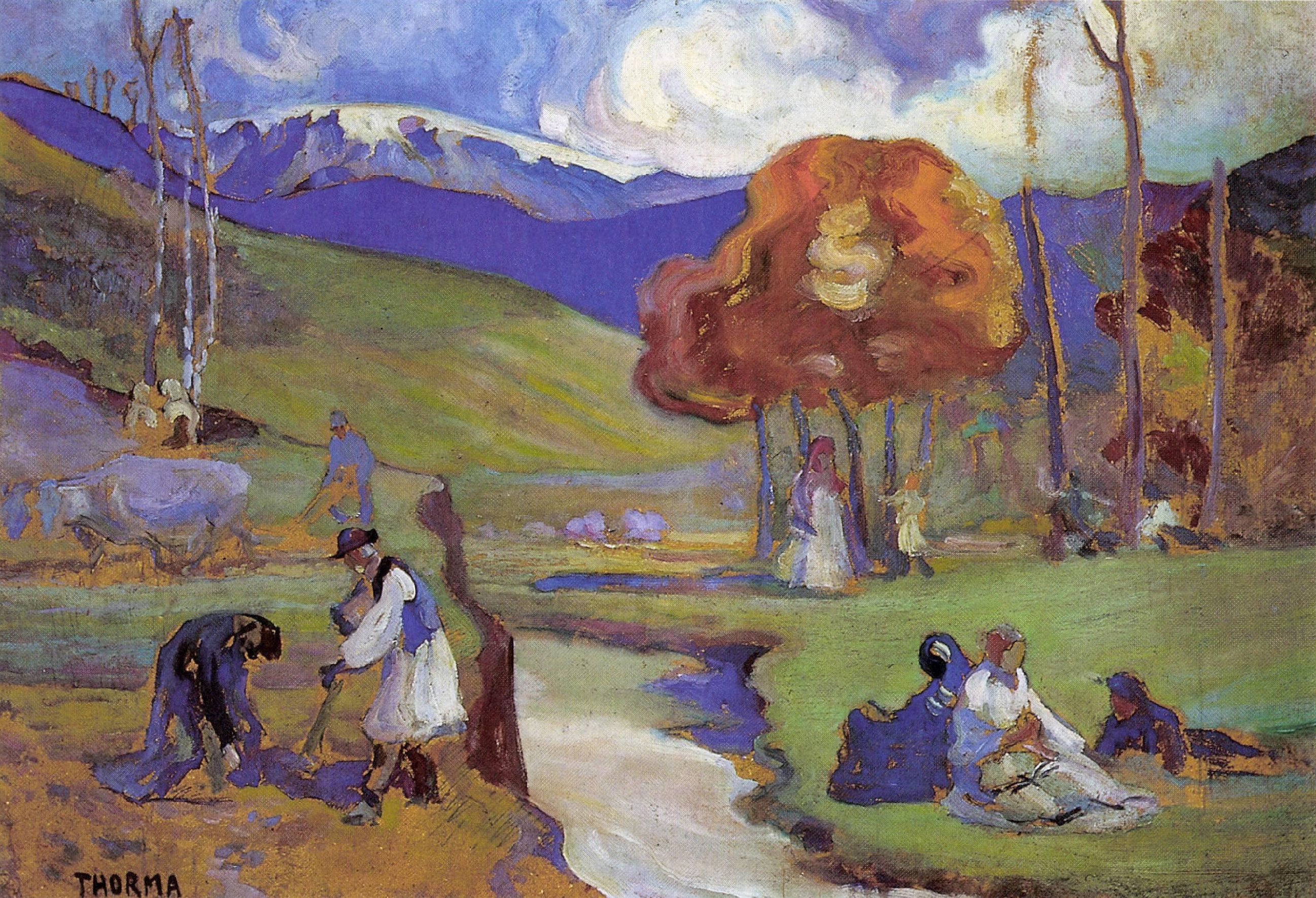
Landscape in Autumn (1920)

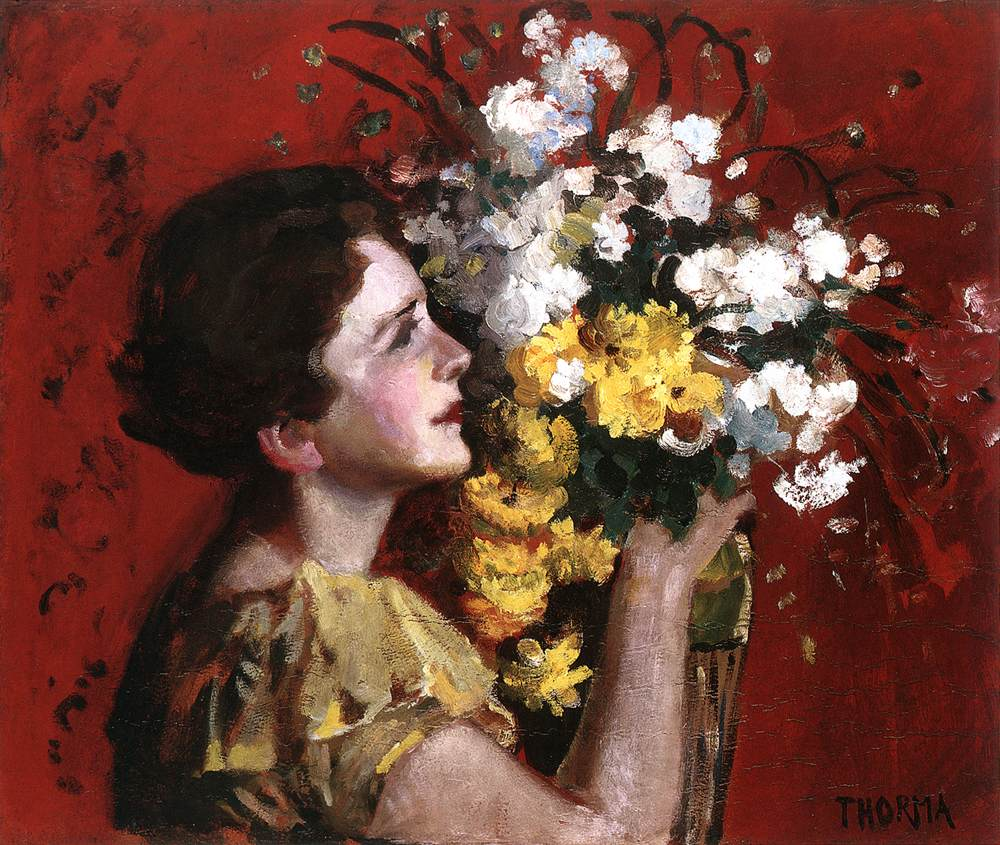
Intoxicating Blooms (1928)

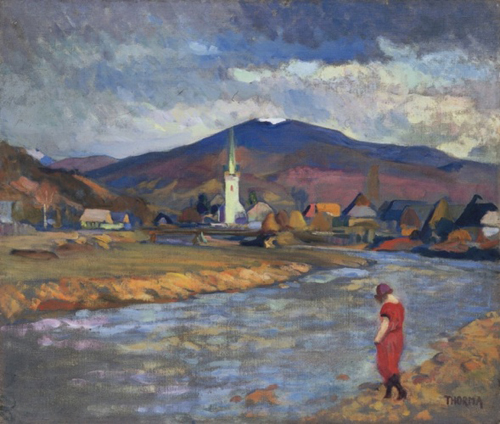
Spring in Nagybánya (ca. 1930)

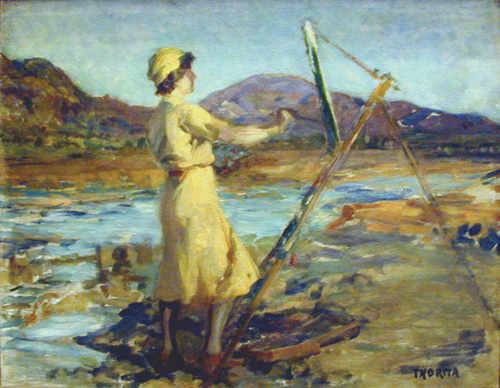
Woman Painter (1934)

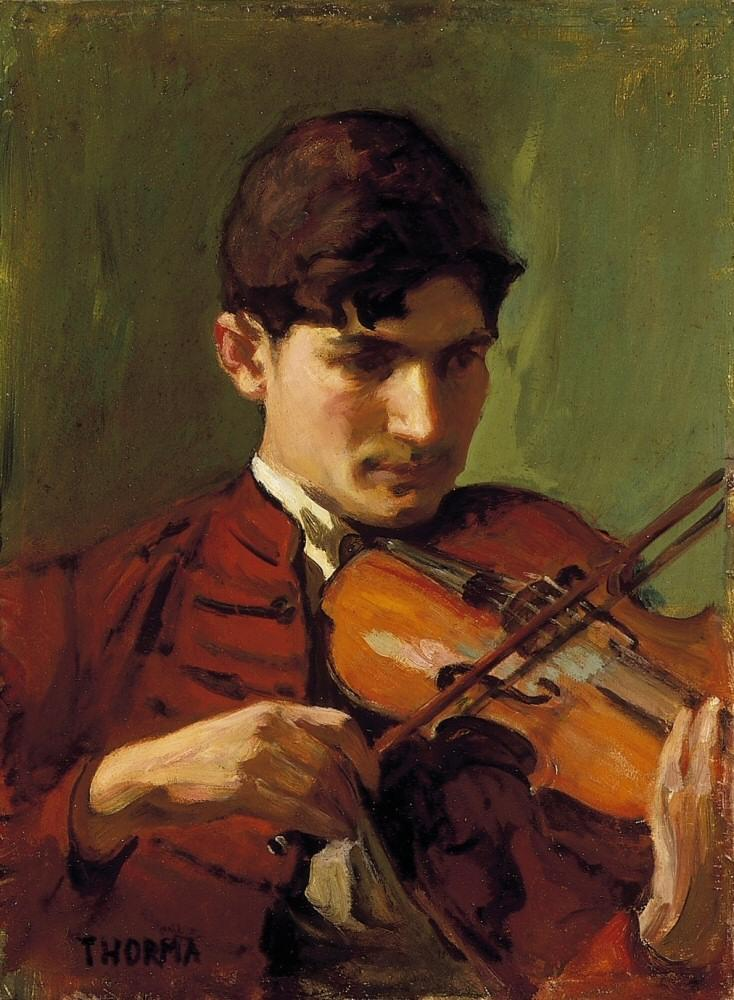
The Voice of the Violin (undated)
