= Committee of National Defence of Hungary 1848-1849 =

1848–49 government of Hungary

The National Defence Commission (shortly Honvédelmi Bizottmány, or OHB) was the supreme body (government) of the executive power in Hungary during the 1848–49 War of Independence, between October 2, 1848 and April 14, 1849.

== Background ==
On March 15, after news of the Viennese Revolution spread, a Hungarian delegation from the Diet in Pressburg (Pozsony/Bratislava from 1918) traveled to the imperial city. Simultaneously, a revolution had also broken out in Pest. On March 16, news of the Pest Revolution reached Vienna. The court relented and had to concede to the demands of the Pressburg delegation. On March 17, it agreed to the appointment of Count Lajos Batthyány as Prime Minister in cabinet Batthyány. He consented to the formation of an independent Hungarian government and promised that the King would approve the reform laws. The new government under the leadership of Count Lajos Batthyány was no longer accountable to the King, but to the elected representatives of the people, the Hungarian parliament(the successor of the Hungarian Diet of Estates after June in 1848). Thus, it was an independent and accountable government.

The April Laws, passed by the last Estates Parliament, were confirmed by King Ferdinand V on April 11. This marked a turning point in Hungarian history and led to profound changes in the country's economic, political, and governmental systems. Based on the April Laws, Hungary achieved near-complete independence. The unification of Hungary and Transylvania was proclaimed. The laws guaranteed civic development and the opportunity to catch up with the West. The abolition of the feudal system, based on serfdom and aristocratic privileges, began. The abolition of serfdom was also planned, but the precise procedure for this had not yet been determined.

The first elections to the National Assembly of People's Representatives(parlament), as stipulated in Article V of the April Laws, took place in the second half of June. The official opening was held on July 5 in Pest. The National Assembly remained in existence until the end of the War of Independence, albeit with a partial exchange of members. Sessions continued in Pest until December 31. in 1848.

With the Fourth Act of 1848, the parliament was moved from Pressburg (Pozsony/Bratislava from 1918) to Pest. The choice of the new location was significant, as Pest was developing into the center of Hungarian political and cultural life at that time, and holding parliament there symbolized a commitment to modernization and reform. This move brought political decisions closer to the country's economic and social center.

The first parliamentary assembly convened in Pest on July 5 – a crucial step in the history of the Hungarian Reform period(1825-1848). Instead of the previously predominantly aristocratic Diet, elected representatives of the people now gathered to make decisions that directly influenced the fate of the country. This parliamentary session in Pest, considered one of the most significant events of the Reform period, marked the beginning of modern political life in Hungary.

On September 11, Jellasics, with his army of 35,000 men, crossed the Drava River and attacked the Hungarian government. The Hungarian army repeatedly retreated before the numerically superior Croatian forces, and Jellasics refused to meet with Palatine Stephen, who had offered to mediate. László Csány replaced the unpredictable Count Ádám Teleki as commander of the retreating Drava army. Although the Hungarian army gradually grew in size, it remained vastly outnumbered by the Croatian forces. In Vienna, the proclamation for the subjugation of Hungary was already being drafted.

== Establishment the Committee of National Defence ==
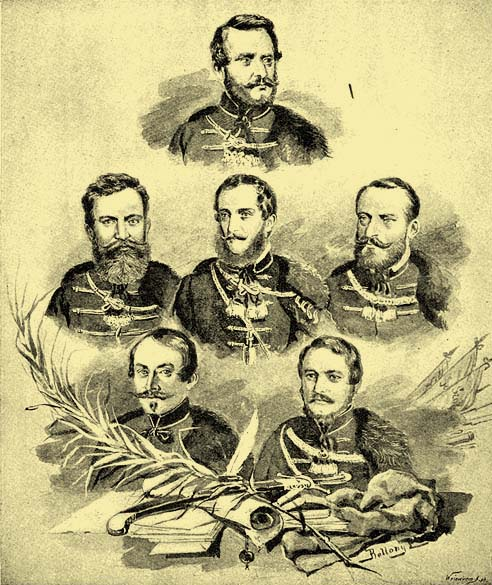
The National Defense Committee (OHB) János Pálffy, László Madarász, Lajos Kossuth, István Patay, Imre Sembery, and Pál Nyáry

.

After the resignation of the Batthyány government on September 11, the country was paralyzed. The monarch, Ferdinand V of Hungary (I of the Austrian Empire), initially hesitated to recognize the new government formed by Batthyány and finally refused to do so on October 3.

The House of Representatives resolved this situation by establishing a six-member committee on September 16, at the suggestion of Lajos Kossuth. Batthyány was also a member of this committee. Its task was to mediate between Batthyány, who was running the government alone, and the House of Representatives. With Batthyány's second resignation on October 2, the OHB (Országos Honvédelmi Bizottmány: National Defense Committee) became a de facto government agency. To confirm this, Parliament issued a declaration on October 8, 1848, stating that until the formation of a new government appointed by the King, it would transfer to the National Defense Committee "all the powers belonging to the government of the country." Since, under the circumstances, there was no hope of royal approval for a new government, the National Defense Committee thus became a permanent institution, replacing the government.

The National Defense Committee submitted several important resolutions to Parliament. Kossuth intended this procedure to demonstrate that Parliament made the decisions and the National Defense Committee merely implemented them. In reality, however, only political decisions initiated by him with the support of the National Defense Committee could be made. This system of governance granted Kossuth virtually unlimited power.

With the dethronement of the House of Habsburg and the election of Kossuth as Governor-President (April 14, 1849), the activities of the OHB came to an end. Afterwards, nothing stood in the way of the formation of the Szemere government (May 2).

== Sources ==
- Bona, Gábor (1999). The Hungarian Revolution and War of Independence, 1848-1849. A Military History. New York: Columbia University Press. p. 606. ISBN 978-0-88033-433-4.
- Deák, István. Lawful Revolution: Louis Kossuth and the Hungarians 1848–1849 (Phoenix, 2001). ISBN 19781842121481
- Kossuth Lajos az Országos Honvédelmi Bizottmány élén. (1-2.) S.a.r.: Barta István. Bp. 1952-1953, Akadémiai Kiadó. (Kossuth Lajos összes munkái XIII-XIV. – Kossuth Lajos 1848/49-ben III-IV.)
- F.Kiss Erzsébet: 1848-1849-es magyar minisztériumok. Bp. 1987, Akadémiai Kiadó. ISBN 9630542137
- Ember Győző: Kossuth a Honvédelmi Bizottmány élén. In: Kossuth Emlékkönyv. Bp. 1952.
- Urbán Aladár: Mikor alakult meg az Országos Honvédelmi Bizottmány? In: Rubicon 2002/8
- Urbán Aladár: A Honvédelmi Bizottmány megválasztása. In: Hadtörténelmi Közlemények 2001/2-3.
- Kossuth az OHB elnöke, múlt-kor, 2003. október 8.
