= Pál Kiss =

Austro-Hungarian military officer (1809-1867)

General Pál Kiss
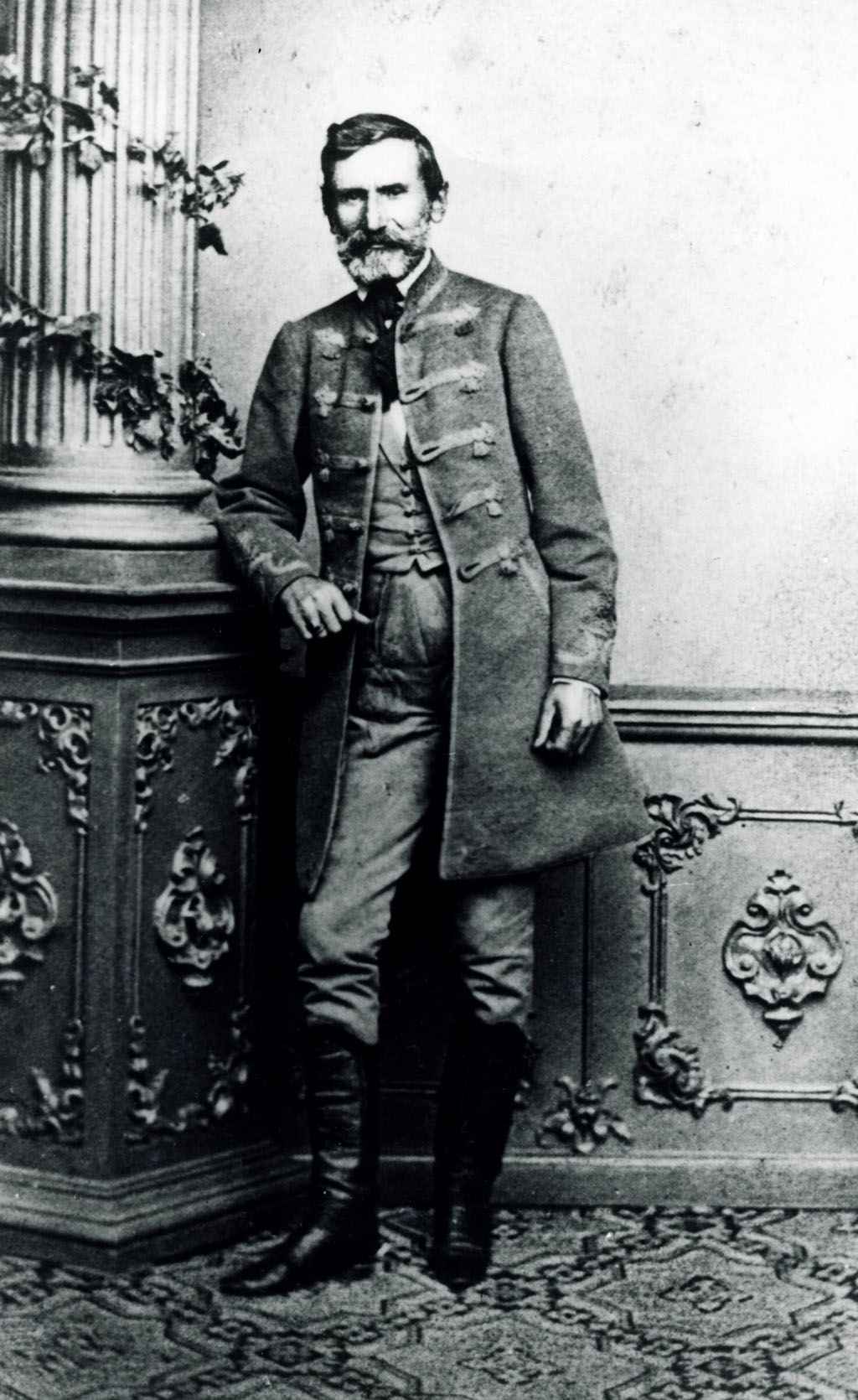
- General Kiss in honvéd uniform
- Born: 1809; Bihardiószeg, Kingdom of Hungary, Austrian Empire
- Died: May 27, 1867 Pest, Austria-Hungary
- Allegiance: Austrian Empire; Hungarian Revolutionary Army
- Rank: Major general
- Commands: Petrovaradin Fortress
- Conflicts: Hungarian Revolution of 1848
- Awards: Hungarian Military Merit Medal (2nd and 3rd Class)

Pál Kiss (1809 – 27 May 1867) was a Hungarian honvéd general who played a notable role in the Hungarian Revolution of 1848.

== Early life and education ==
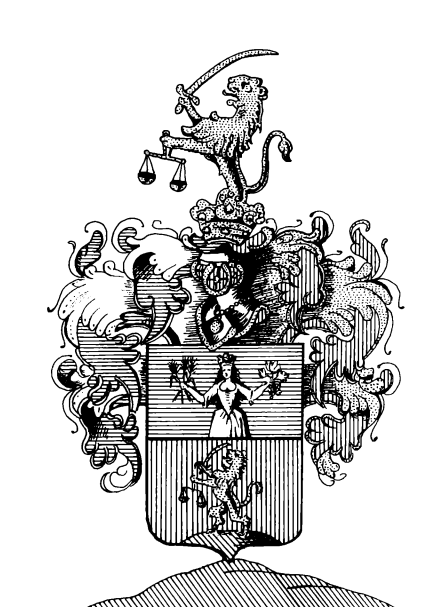
Coat of Arms of the Kiss family

Pál Kiss was born into a wealthy noble family of Greek or Aromanian origin in Diosig (Bihardiószeg), then part of Bihar County in the Austrian Empire. His father was a prosperous merchant, and the family had been granted nobility in 1795. The family adhered to the Eastern Orthodox Church.

He completed his secondary education at the Reformed College in Debrecen.

== Military career ==
Kiss began his military career in 1828 as a soldier in the Imperial Austrian Army. He rose through the ranks to become a lieutenant and later first lieutenant. On 27 April 1848, he was appointed sub-captain in the 37th Infantry Regiment.

=== Revolution of 1848–1849 ===
In the spring of 1848, while stationed in Nagyvárad, Kiss took part in organizing the National Guard of Bihar County. During the summer, he led a mobilized battalion in military operations in the Banat region.

On 6 September 1848, he joined the Royal Hungarian Honvéd army as a major. He commanded the 10th Honvéd Battalion and, from October 1848, the 9th Honvéd Battalion (the so-called red-capped battalion from Kassa). He distinguished himself in battles under General János Damjanich.

On 31 January 1849, he was promoted to lieutenant colonel and appointed brigade commander. On 26 February, he temporarily assumed command of the siege forces at Arad. In March, he returned to the III Army Corps under Damjanich and fought throughout the spring campaign.

Following the Battle of Tápióbicske (4 April 1849), Kiss was promoted to colonel (7 April) and awarded the Hungarian Military Merit Medal, 3rd Class. After the Battle of Komárom (26 April 1849), he received the 2nd Class of the same decoration.

After the reorganization of the Hungarian army, he became commander of an infantry division in the I Corps of the Danube Army and took part in the siege of Buda.

=== General and fortress commander ===
On 19 June 1849, Kiss was promoted to major general. He was appointed commander of the fortress of Petrovaradin Fortress (today in Novi Sad, Serbia), one of the last strongholds of the Hungarian revolutionary army.

His appointment followed a recommendation by General Artúr Görgei to Governor-President Lajos Kossuth.

After the defeat of Hungarian forces and the Surrender at Világos in August 1849, Petrovaradin remained among the final resisting positions. Under Kiss's command, the fortress held out until 7 September 1849, when it capitulated to imperial forces.

The capitulation was unconditional, although the garrison of approximately 5,800 soldiers and around 200 artillery pieces received amnesty. Kiss and several officers were briefly detained.

== Trial and later life ==
After the suppression of the revolution, Kiss was brought before a military tribunal and sentenced to death on 15 December 1849. However, he was pardoned under a general amnesty decree issued by Emperor Franz Joseph I of Austria.

Following his release, he retired from military life and settled as a landowner in Tiszaörs and later in Tiszafüred. In 1854, he married Mária Bernáth.

He died on 27 May 1867 in Pest and was buried in Tiszafüred.

== Legacy ==
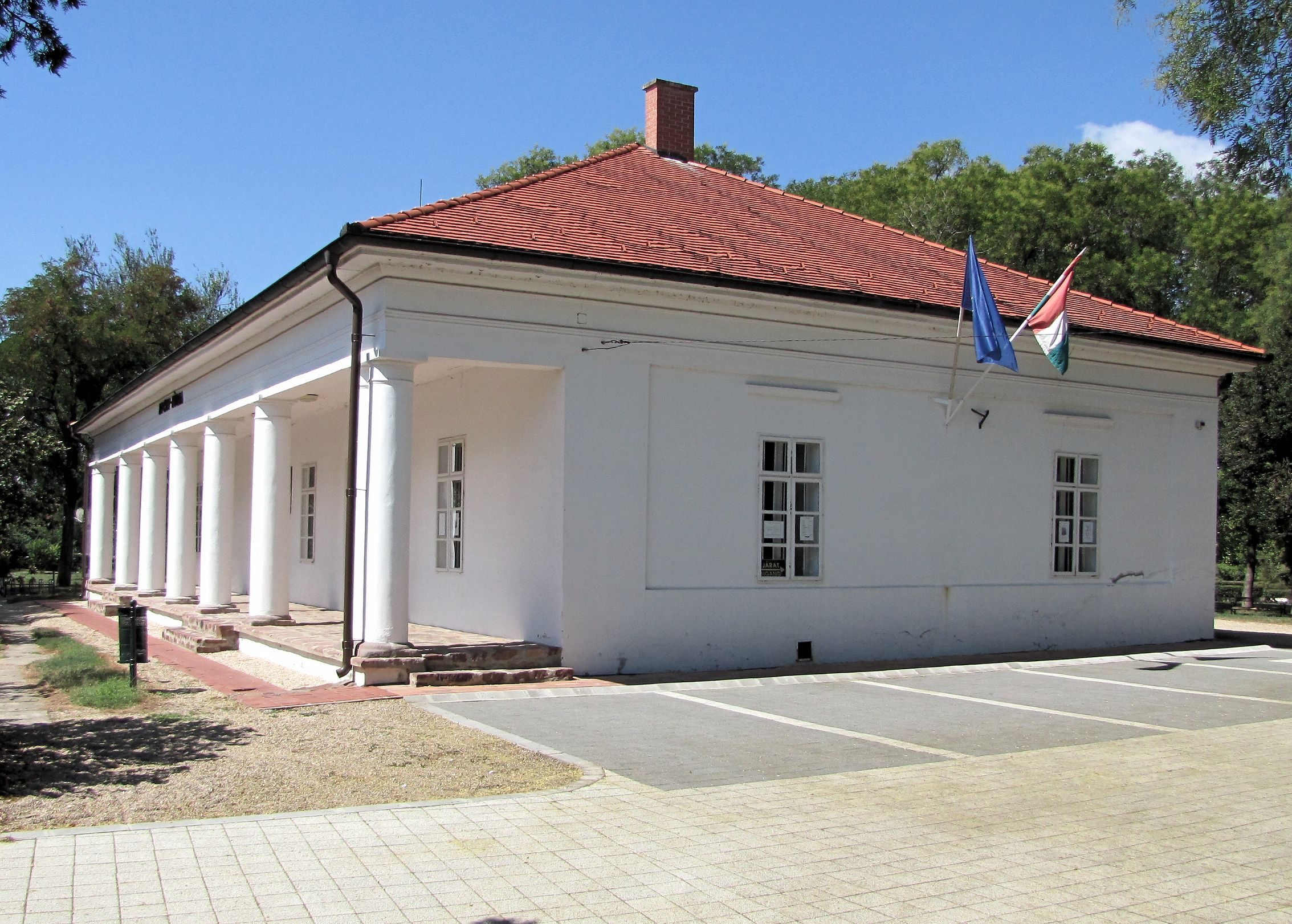
The Pál Kiss Museum in Tiszafüred

In 1953, the local museum in Tiszafüred was named after him (Kiss Pál Museum). His grave is maintained in the town cemetery, and a commemorative plaque has been installed in his birthplace, Diosig.
