= Siege of Petrovaradin =

- Part of the Hungarian Revolution of 1848 and the Serb uprising of 1848–1849
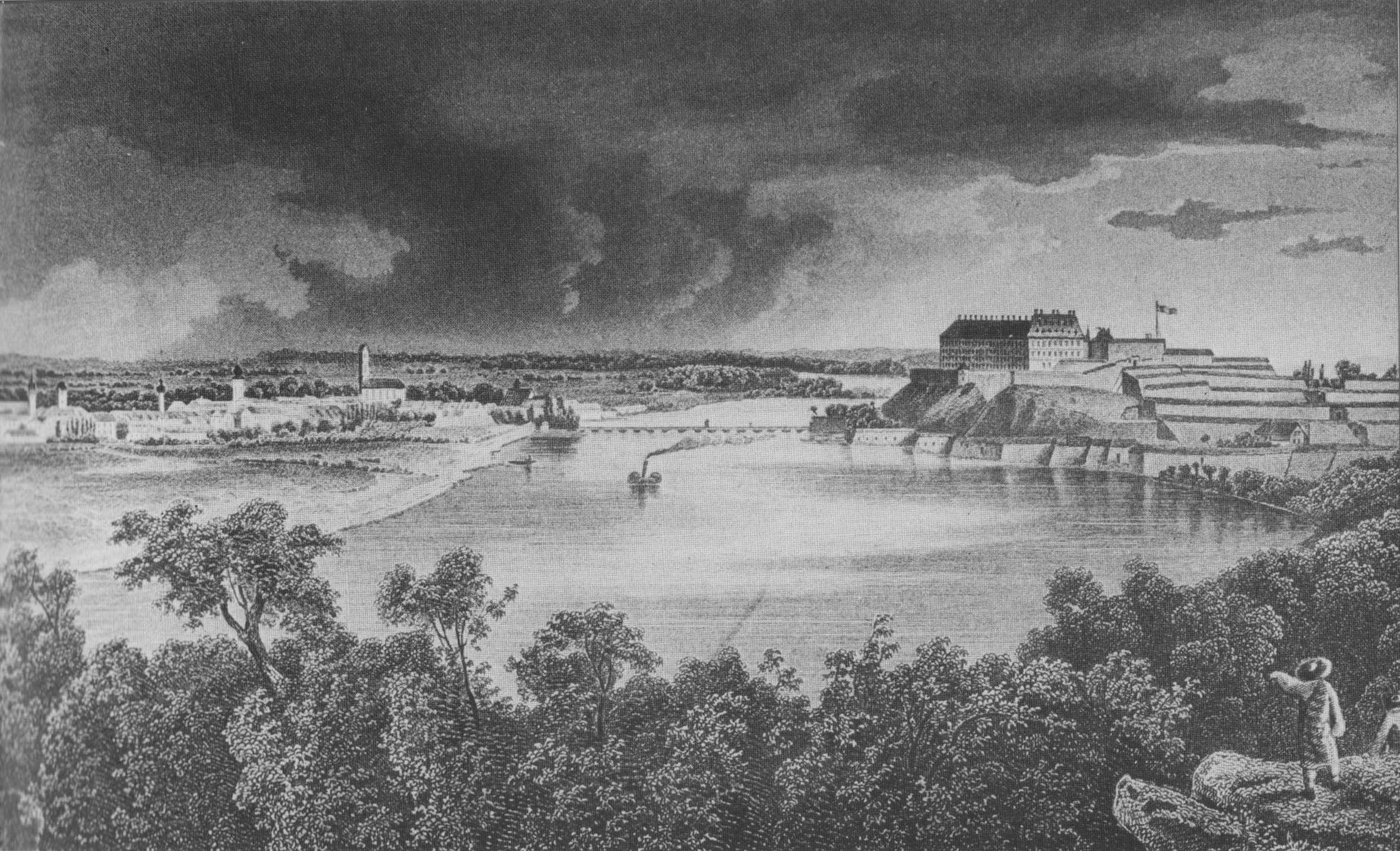
- Novi Sad (left) and the Petrovaradin Fortress (right) in the 19th century
Date	December 1848 – 7 September 1849
Location	Petrovaradin Fortress
Result	Austrian victory; Hungarian surrender under terms of amnesty
Territorial changes	Fortress returned to Austrian control

Belligerents
Hungarian Revolutionary Army	Austrian Empire: Croatia; (Serbian Vojvodina) Serbian rebels

Commanders and leaders
Pál Kiss	Josip Jelačić; Emmerich Blagoevich

Strength
~8,000–10,000 men 400+ cannons	Unknown

Casualties and losses
Unknown	Unknown (thousands)

The Siege of Petrovaradin (Hungarian: Pétervárad ostroma) was a prolonged military engagement during the Hungarian Revolution of 1848–1849. From late 1848 until September 1849, the Petrovaradin Fortress — strategically located on the Danube — was held by the Hungarian Revolutionary Army (Honvédség) against the forces of the Austrian Empire and their Serbian and Croatian allies.

The siege is most notable for the devastating bombardment of the city of Novi Sad and for being one of the final Hungarian strongholds to capitulate after the main revolutionary forces surrendered at Világos.

== Strategic background ==
Known as the Gibraltar on the Danube, the Petrovaradin Fortress was considered one of the most formidable defensive structures in the Austrian Empire. Its position allowed control over river traffic on the Danube and provided a military gateway into the regions of Bačka and Syrmia.

When the Hungarian Revolution broke out in March 1848, the garrison of the fortress remained loyal to the Hungarian Ministry of War. By late 1848, as the conflict escalated into a full-scale war for independence, Petrovaradin became a key revolutionary stronghold in the southern theatre. It functioned as a defensive bulwark against the forces of Josip Jelačić and the Serbian insurgents of Serbian Vojvodina.

== The blockade and siege ==
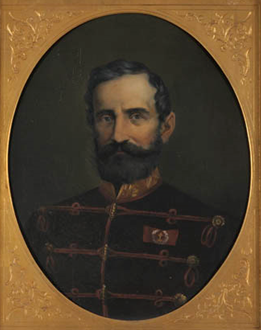
General Pál Kiss, who commanded the Hungarian troops at Petrovaradin

For much of early 1849, Petrovaradin was subjected not to a continuous high-intensity siege but rather to a strict blockade. Austrian forces aimed to starve the garrison into submission while concentrating their main military efforts elsewhere.

The Hungarian garrison, commanded initially by Ágoston Berger and later by General Pál Kiss, took advantage of the fortress's elevated position. They launched frequent sorties and conducted artillery strikes against imperial positions, maintaining pressure on the besieging forces.

== Bombardment of Novi Sad ==
The most significant and controversial event of the siege occurred on 12 June 1849. Following the arrival of Hungarian forces under Mór Perczel in the vicinity, Austrian and Serbian troops occupied Novi Sad, located directly across the river from the fortress.

Fearing that imperial forces would use the city's buildings as cover for an assault, General Pál Kiss ordered the fortress artillery to open fire. Approximately 200 cannons bombarded the city for several hours.

The bombardment destroyed nearly two-thirds of Novi Sad's Baroque architecture, including numerous churches and municipal buildings. It caused heavy civilian casualties and left the city in ruins for decades.

== Final surrender ==
After the decisive Hungarian defeat at the Battle of Temesvár and the main army's surrender at Világos on 13 August 1849, the Petrovaradin garrison became completely isolated.

Despite the collapse of the revolutionary government, the defenders held out for several more weeks in hopes of negotiating favorable terms. On 7 September 1849, General Pál Kiss formally surrendered the fortress to Austrian authorities.

== Aftermath ==
Unlike many leaders of the Hungarian army who were executed following the executions at Arad, the defenders of Petrovaradin were granted relatively lenient terms. The garrison was allowed to withdraw, and although Pál Kiss was initially sentenced to death, his sentence was commuted to imprisonment by Emperor Franz Joseph I of Austria. He was later pardoned.

The destruction of Novi Sad became a defining moment in the city's history. Reconstruction efforts in the late 19th century transformed it into an important cultural center, eventually earning it the nickname "Serbian Athens." However, the scars of the 1849 bombardment remained visible into the early 20th century.
