= Utješenović =

Utješenović is a surname. Notable people with the surname include:

- Doug Utjesenovic (born 1946), Yugoslav footballer
- Ognjeslav Utješenović (1817–1890), Serbian politician
