= Cabinet Batthyány =

Hungarian government in 1848

The Batthyány cabinet (or government) (March 23, 1848 – October 2, 1848) was the first government of the semi-independent Hungary which was separate from the Austrian central cabinets and government except in some cases since 1527. On March 23, 1848, on the lower floor of the Diet, Lajos Batthyány, the Prime Minister appointed on March 17, announced the names of the cabinet The Batthyány cabinet resigned on September 11 1848, but for various reasons finally handed over its role to the National Defense Committee on October 2.

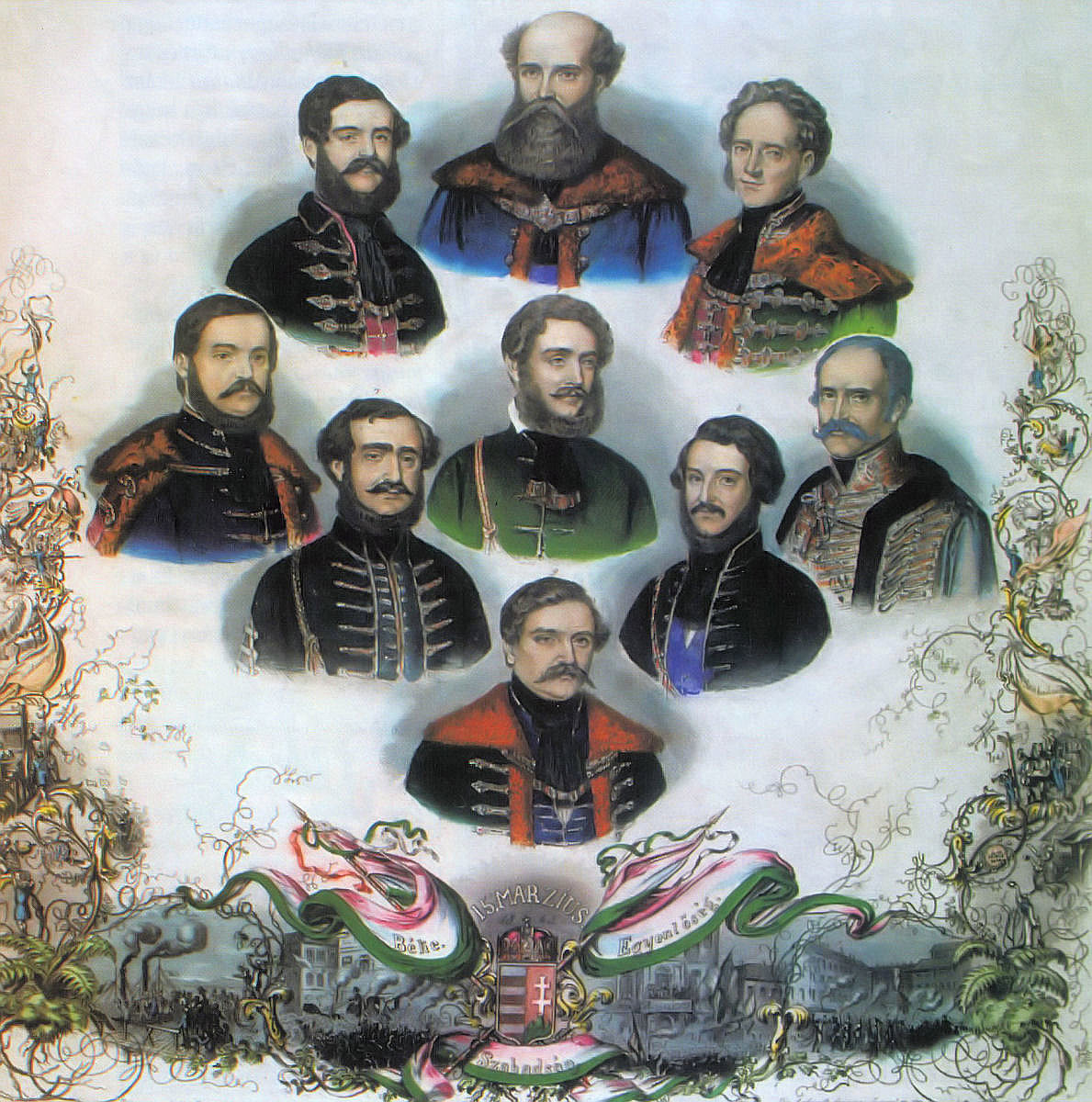
Members of Battyány cabinet of Hungary:Prime Minister Lajos Batthyány, ministers: Bertalan Szemere (interior affairs), Pál Esterházy (matters surrounding the king's person), Gábor Klauzál (agriculture, industry, trade), Lajos Kossuth (finance), Lázár Mészáros (military affairs), István Széchenyi (public works and transportation), József Eötvös (religion and public education), Ferenc Deák (justice)

.

== History ==
On April 2, 1848 Lajos Batthyány submitted the cabinet list to Palatine Stephen von Habsburg, and on April 7, 1848, the monarch signed the document appointing the first independent, responsible Hungarian government. On April 10, in the evening, Austrian emperor and Hungarian king Ferdinand V. and his wife arrived in Pozsony (since 1918 Bratislava, Slovakia), and the next morning the members of the government took the oath. The government was composed of four nobles and five commoners: Count Lajos Batthyány (minister president or prime minister); interior affairs: Bertalan Szemere; relations with Austria: Prince Pál Esterházy; finance: Lajos Kossuth; war affairs: Lázár Mészáros; transport: Count István Széchenyi; culture and education: Baron József Eötvös; agriculture and industry: Gábor Klauzál; justice: Ferenc Deák.

The political struggle between the Viennese court (Habsburg dynasty) and the new semi-independent Hungarian government was aimed at making it clear to both sides what forces were behind the political groups. It had been clear since 15 March 1848 that neither the court nor the imperial interest groups would accept, nor could they accept, the existing circumstances until it was clear that they had to accept them. The court did everything it could to end the financial and military separation, and while it "softened" the Batthyány cabinet with its submissions, drafts, and negotiations, it expected it to fall into the serf liberation (and the related financial crisis) and the nationalist movements. However, the Hungarian government (Batthyány cabinet) stood its ground: it supported almost all the important decisions of the People's Representative Parliament. Not only was the issue of serf emancipation resolved satisfactorily (even by imposing martial law against land seizures), but the basis for financial independence was also being formed – see Kossuth banknotes – and even the suppression of the Serbian movement threatening civil war in the southern territories was expected, which seemed to be only a matter of time.

In the first month of the cabinet, Batthyány took it upon himself to cover position of Lázár Mészáros, who was at the head of his regiment in Lombardy. Thus, Batthyány had to face in a double capacity the fact that the Hungarian army stationed in the country did not obey the government. He traveled to Vienna to clarify the situation, and managed to get the king to issue a manuscript on May 7, according to which the Hungarian Minister of National Defense would have control over the conscripts stationed in the country.

Batthyány’s strength is also shown by the fact that he was able to appear as a negotiating party with the formation of a new government – and only then did he withdraw and hand over executive power to the National Defense Committee, which had a military nature, when he had tried everything.

These Hungarian successes led the court to the decision that only military means could be used to achieve a useful decision for it (this was partly the result of the military successes of the counter-revolution – victories in Austria, Bohemia and northern Italy – and partly the consideration of the military potential of the territories that were increasingly under his control). However, the clarity of the decision became clear quite late: this made it possible to prepare and take on the fight.

Batthyány was rarely present at the session that opened on July 5, 1848, mostly only on occasions when he considered the government's decision important. On August 27, Batthyány, accompanied by Ferenc Deák, went to Vienna to have the king ratify the laws on the raising of soldiers and the issuance of paper money, which were important due to the threatening Croatian attack. However, they did not negotiate with them in Vienna, and in the meantime the king sent the Palatine Stephen the State Document of the Austrian government, according to which he had no right to ratify the April laws. Batthyány found himself in an impossible situation and the Hungarian representatives had to act.
