= Ostrožin =

Ostrožin Острожин (Serbian)
- Village
- Interactive map of Ostrožin
- Location of Ostrožin in Croatia
- Coordinates: 45°25′44″N 15°51′21″E
- Country: Croatia
- Region: Continental Croatia
- County: Sisak-Moslavina County
- Municipality: Gvozd

Area
  - Total: 17.7 km^{2} (6.8 sq mi)
- Elevation: 184 m (604 ft)

Population (2021)
  - Total: 22
  - Density: 1.2/km^{2} (3.2/sq mi)
- Time zone: UTC+1 (CET)
  - Summer (DST): UTC+2 (CEST)
- Postal code: 44410
- Area code: (+385) 44

Ostrožin (Serbian Cyrillic: Острожин) is a village in central Croatia, in the municipality of Gvozd, Sisak-Moslavina County. It is connected by the D6 highway.

== History ==
The Ostrožin Rulebook (Croatian: Ostrožinski pravilnik) was adopted on 14 December 1941 in Ostrožin. Predating the Foča Regulations by more than a month, the Ostrožin Rulebook was the first legal act which regulated the new national authority in the liberated territories during the national liberation war of Yugoslavia.

== Demographics ==
According to the 2011 census, the village of Ostrožin has 32 inhabitants. This represents 8.14% of its pre-war population according to the 1991 census.

According to the 1991 census, 94.91% of the village population were ethnic Serbs (373/393), 0.76% were ethnic Croats (3/393), 0.51% were Yugoslavs (2/393) and 3.82% were of other ethnic origin (15/393).

Population change 1857-2011
v

population	845	821	805	942	1052	1259	1238	1280	1019	1052	904	784	578	393	64	32
	1857	1869	1880	1890	1900	1910	1921	1931	1948	1953	1961	1971	1981	1991	2001	2011

Sources: Croatian Bureau of Statistics publications

== Notable natives and residents ==
- Ognjeslav Utješinović Ostrožinski (1817–1890) - politician and writer
