= Ustani, bane =

Croatian song

Song
- Language: Croatian

Ustani, bane (lit. Rise, ban) is a Croatian patriotic song. It was written at the turn of the 20th century by Ognjeslav Utješinović Ostrožinski.

== Lyrics ==
Croatian

Bilo je to godine, devetsto i treće,
Kad su našu Hrvatsku stigle nesreće.
Mađarske zastave digo Hedervary
Silom hoće Hrvatsku da nam pomađari.

Ustani bane, Hrvatska te zove, zove,
Ustani bane Jelačiću!

Nema junaka, nema Hrvata,
Kao što je bio Jelačić ban.
A sada njega crna zemlja krije.
I zelena trava prekrila mu grob.

English translation

It was the year nine hundred and three,
When trouble befell our Croatia.
Hedervary raised Hungarian flags
Trying to Magyarize our Croatia by force.

Rise, ban, Croatia calls you, calls you,
Rise, ban Jelačić!

There isn't a hero, there isn't a Croat,
Like Jelačić ban was.
But now the black soil hides him,
And green grass covers his grave.
