= Kuzman Todorović =

Austrian military leader (1787–1858)

Kuzman Todorović Кузман Тодоровић
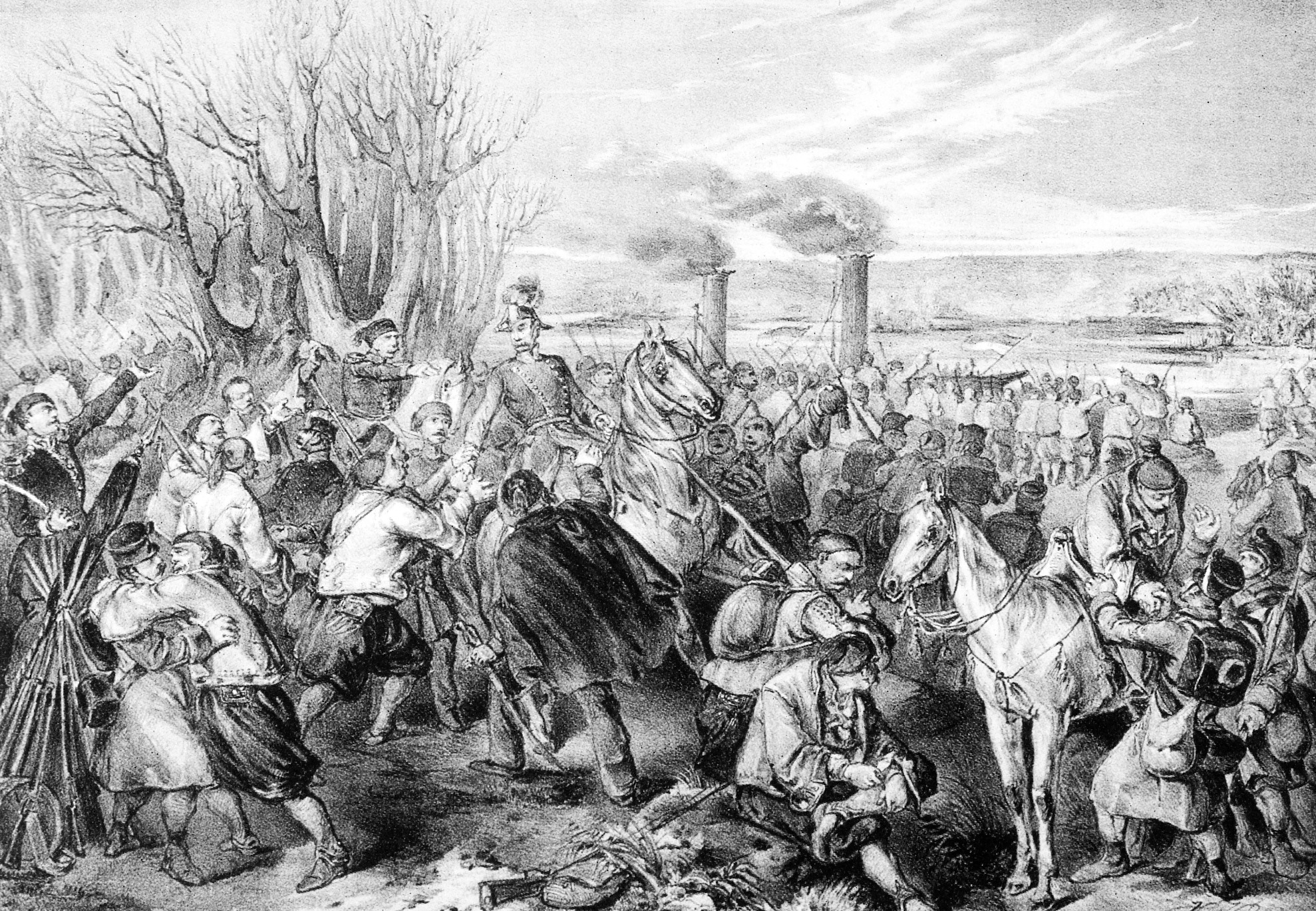
- Kuzman Todorović's farewell to the returning Serbians on March 5, 1849
- Born: 1787; Military Frontier, Habsburg monarchy
- Died: 2 October 1858 (aged 70–71); Venice, Austrian Empire
- Military career
- Allegiance: Austrian Empire
- Branch: Imperial-Royal Army
- Rank: Lieutenant General
- Conflicts: Hungarian Revolution of 1848; Serb Uprising of 1848–49
- Awards: Order of Leopold

Kuzman Todorović (Serbian Cyrillic: Кузман Тодоровић, 1787–1858), was an Austrian imperial lieutenant general of Serb origin who fought in the 1848 Hungarian Revolution.

== Career ==
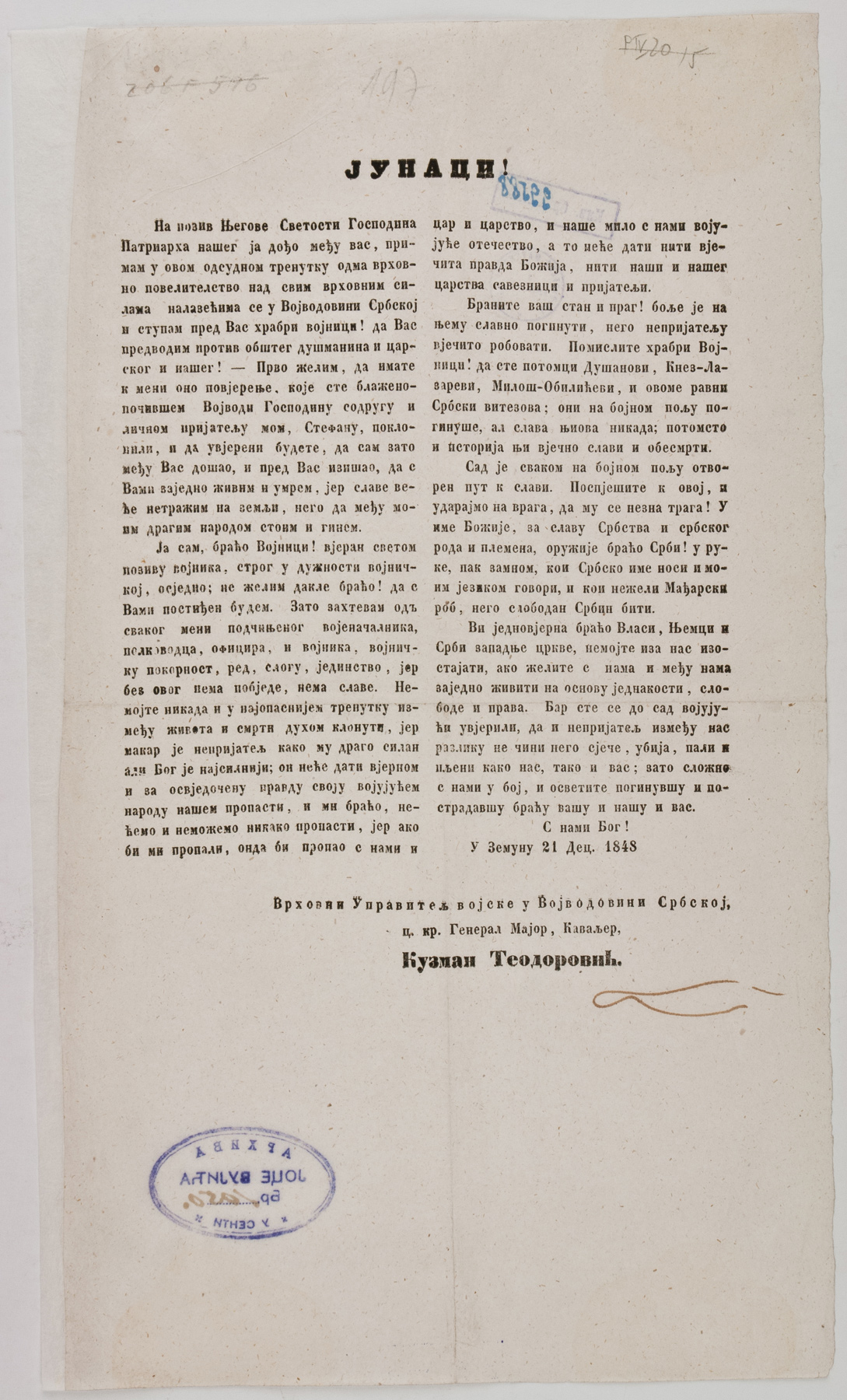
Proclamation of General T(e)odorović as Commander-in-Chief on December 21, 1848/January 2, 1849

In 1848, Kuzman Todorović held the title of Major General and Commander of the Charles City Brigade. He took part in Josip Jelačić's autumn campaign and then returned to Croatia with the less valuable part of the army, about 10–15,000 people (mostly insurgents). He successfully repulsed the attacks of the Hungarian troops, which consisted mainly of national guards, but he was unable to deter his undisciplined army from looting afterwards. After Stevan Šupljikac's death, he was appointed commander-in-chief of the Serbian troops in the south on 3 January 1849 by Patriarch Josif Rajačić. On 19 January the same year at Vršac, another ethnic Serb János Damjanich who led the Hungarians succeeded in repulsing the Serbian troops under the commands of both Kuzman Todorović and Stevan Knićanin. On February 8, the Timisoara garrison, reinforced with troops, attacked the siege army in Arad, but the initial victory ended in retreat. On 11 February, Todorović visited Szeged in a similar way. On 29 April between Melence and Nagybecskerek, he was defeated by the troops of Mór Perczel and Józef Bem after which he was removed from command. After the defeat of the Hungarian War of Independence, he was promoted to lieutenant general.
