= Ognjeslav Utješenović =

Croatian Serb writer (1817–1890)

Ognjeslav Utješenović Огњеслав Утјешеновић
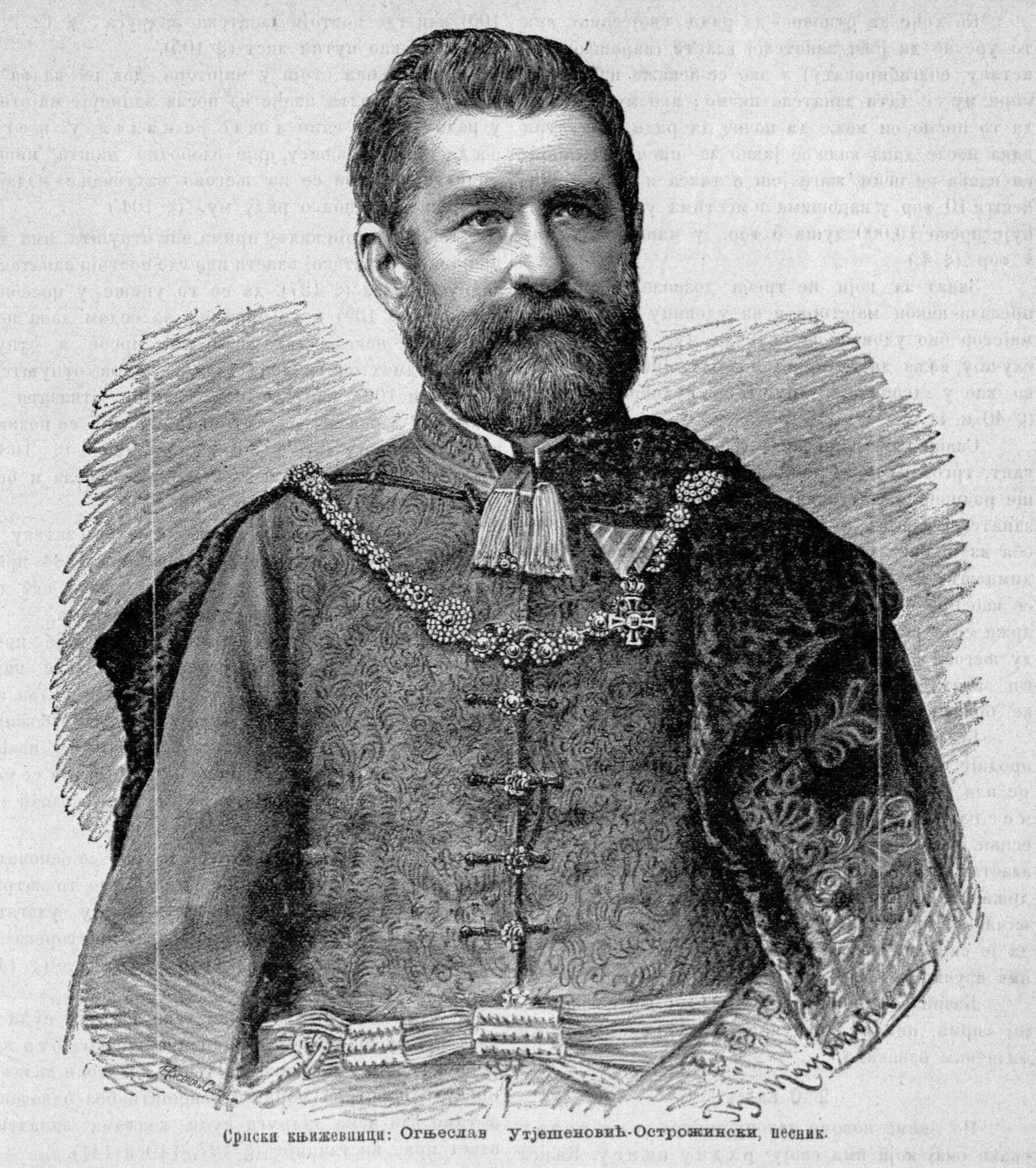
- Born: 21 August 1817; Ostrožin, Croatian Military Frontier, Austrian Empire
- Died: 8 June 1890 (aged 72); Zagreb, Austria-Hungary (present-day Croatia)
- Occupations: Politician, poet

Ognjeslav Utješenović Ostrožinski (spelled Utješinović in some sources; Serbian Cyrillic: Огњеслав Утјешеновић Острожински; 21 August 1817 – 8 June 1890) was a Croatian Serb politician and writer. He is mainly remembered for his role in the Illyrian movement led by Ljudevit Gaj which promoted unity among South Slavs and called for Croatia's independence at the time when the country was part of Austria-Hungary.

== Biography ==
Born in Ostrožin (part of Gvozd) in the Kordun region (which was at the time part of the Croatian Military Frontier), Utješenović graduated in law from the University of Zagreb. He worked as an advisor to Josip Jelačić at the Zagreb military command and was a member of the Croatian parliament's legislation committee which created the bills on the establishment of the Croatian army and the abolishment of the Military Frontier and its merger with Croatia. Upon the defeat of the Hungarian Revolution of 1848 Jelačić appointed him podžupan (vice-governor) of Varaždin County.

During the later years of Alexander von Bach's absolutism (1849–1859) he held the post of ministerial secretary in Vienna (appointed in 1856) and from 1862 to 1867 he worked as an advisor with the Croatian Court Chancellery (German: Hofkanzlei). From 1875 to 1885 he held the post of župan (governor) of Varaždin County. He is credited with the project to build the railway connecting Varaždin and Zaprešić, the development of road infrastructure in the Zagorje region in northern Croatia, as well as the building of the Serbian Orthodox church of St. George in Varaždin.

Utješenović was also an author. In 1871 he published a collection of poems titled Vila Ostrožinska, which was followed by Sitne pjesme. He also wrote several patriotic poems, the best known of which is Uskrsnuće Jelačića bana (The Resurrection of Ban Jelačić), published in December 1866, which was later adapted into a well-known Croatian Reveille song called "Ustani, bane".

One of Utješenović's poems written in 1842 begins,"The whole world sees morning, but in the Balkans daylight never comes." It was a lament about the condition of the ignored, backward, and divided South Slavic peoples, who in the first half of the 19th century still lived under the rule of the Austro-Hungarian Habsburg dynasty and the Turkish empire.

Utješenović died in 1890 and was buried at the Mirogoj Cemetery in Zagreb.

== See also ==
- Lavoslav Vukelić
