= Friedrich von Rüdiger =

German military officer

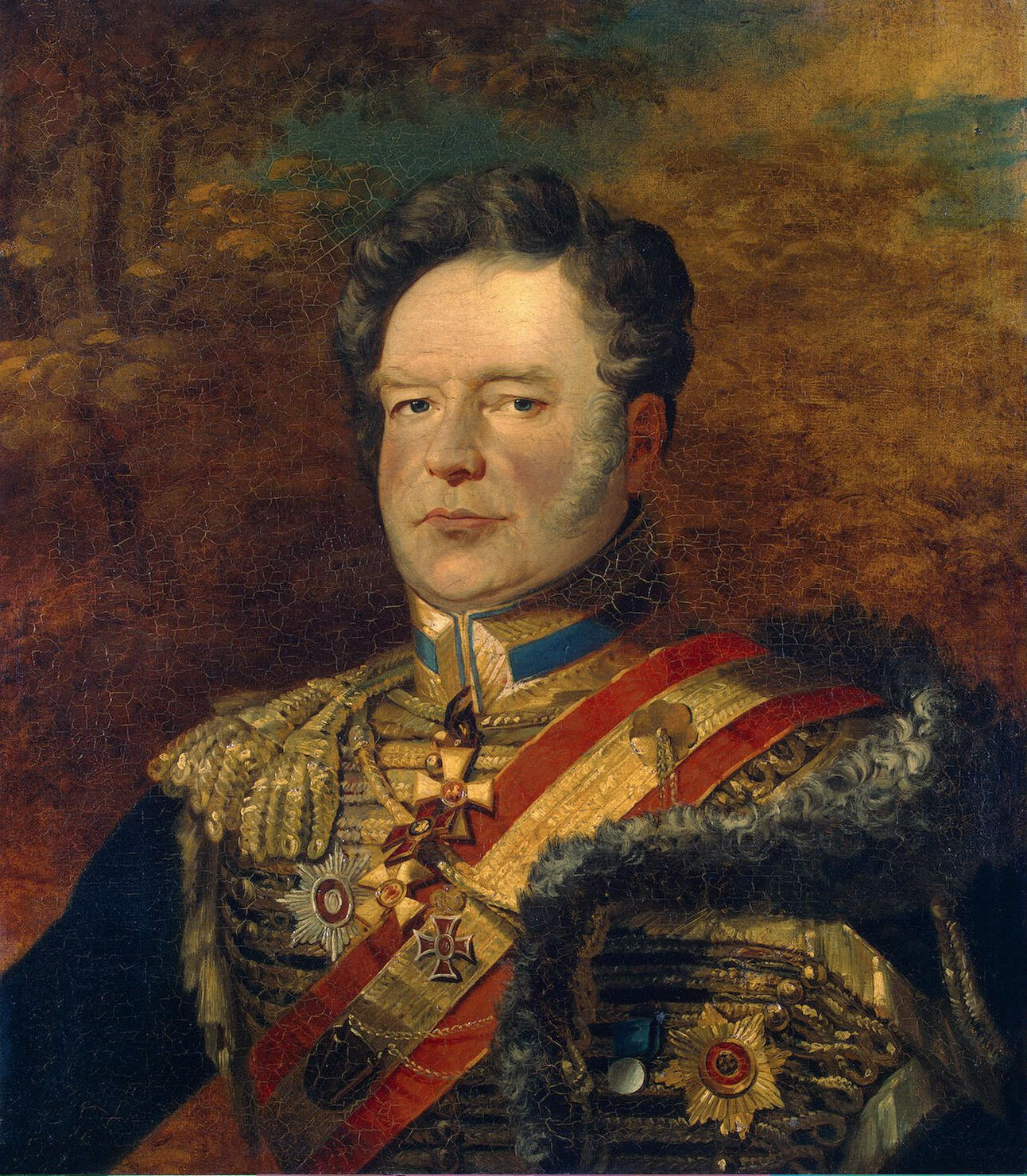
Portrait by George Dawe

Friedrich "Fritz" Alexander von Rüdiger (Russian: Фёдор Васильевич Ридигер; 1783 in Mittau – 11 June 1856 in Saint Petersburg) was a Baltic German military officer in service of the Russian Empire and a general of the Imperial Russian Army.

== Early life ==
Born in Mittau (now Jelgava), Courland to a family of local Baltic Germans, von Rüdiger graduated from a local college in Mittau and in 1799 he joined the Semenovsky Regiment of Life Guards. Throughout his career he served in a number of other units and occupied a number of posts, including Warrant Officer of the Sumy Hussar Regiment (1800) and adjutant to General Peter von der Pahlen (1801). During the Napoleonic Wars he took part in the Battle of Guttstadt-Deppen of 1806. Transferred to Grodno Hussar Regiment, he fought in Battle of Friedland of 1807. For his part in the war he was awarded the Order of St. Anna, 3rd Class.

Following the Treaties of Tilsit he took part in the Finnish War. Promoted to the rank of Major on 23 October 1807, he took part in the capture of Björneborg and Tavastehus. He led a small detachment pursuing the Swedish army all the way to the city of Vaasa and captured it, for which he received the Order of St. Vladimir, 4th class. Until 1812 he commanded the nascent Russian Coast Guard units between Pernau and Revel on the Baltic Sea coast.

== Franco-Russian War ==
During the French invasion of Russia he was recalled to active duty. Initially a staff officer of General Peter Wittgenstein, on 4 June 1812 he managed to take French General Antoine-Louis Decrest de Saint-Germain captive, for which he was promoted to the rank of Colonel soon afterwards. He fought in the Battle of Klyastitsy and, as one of the commanding officers of Russian Front Guard, in the First and Second Battle of Polotsk. For his role in the early battles of the war he was awarded the Order of St. Vladimir, Order of St. Anna (2nd Class) and the Order of St. George (3rd Class).

After the Battle of Chashniki he was promoted to the rank of Major General and became the commanding officer of the Grodno Hussar Regiment. Together with his unit he took part in the bloody Battle of Berezina and captured the city of Vilna.

== Later life ==
During the Hungarian Revolution of 1848, Rüdiger took part in the Russian intervention which helped defeat the rebellion, and he was the Russian signatory of the instrument of Surrender at Világos.
