= Surrender at Világos =

Battle during the Hungarian Revolution

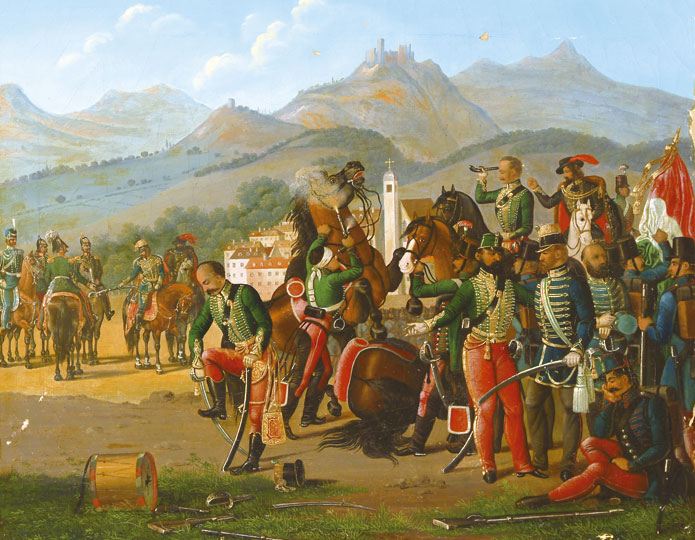
Surrender at Világos (Hungarian painter, mid-19th century)

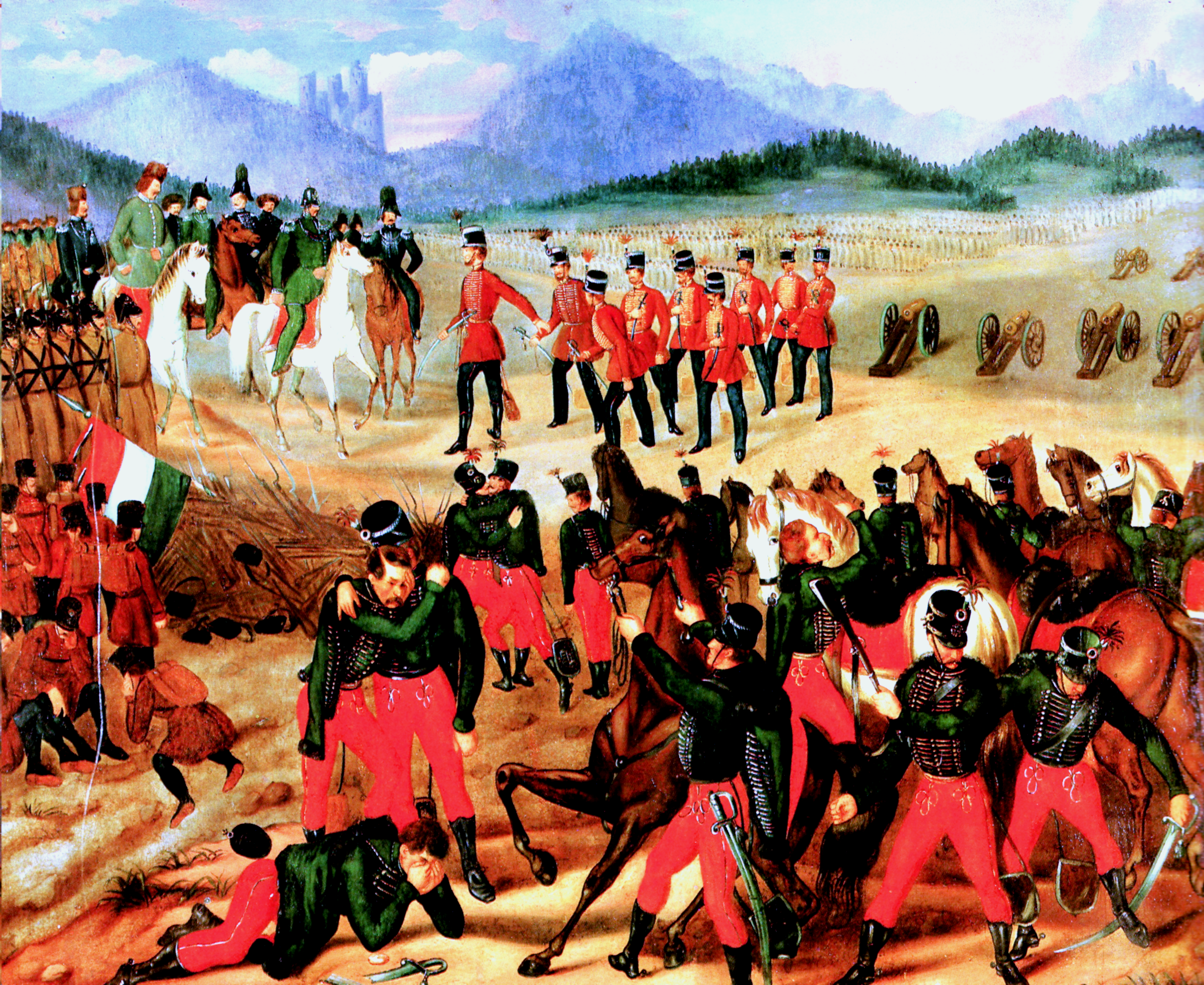
Surrender at Világos (István Szkicsák-Klinovszky)

The Surrender at Világos (Hungarian: világosi fegyverletétel), which was the formal end of the Hungarian Revolution of 1848, took place on 13 August 1849, at Világos (now Șiria, Romania). The terms were signed by General Artúr Görgey of the Hungarian Revolutionary Army on the rebels' side and Count Theodor von Rüdiger of the Imperial Russian Army. Following the capitulation, General Julius Jacob von Haynau was appointed Imperial plenipotentiary in the country and brutally re-subjugated it.

== Russian intervention in the revolution ==
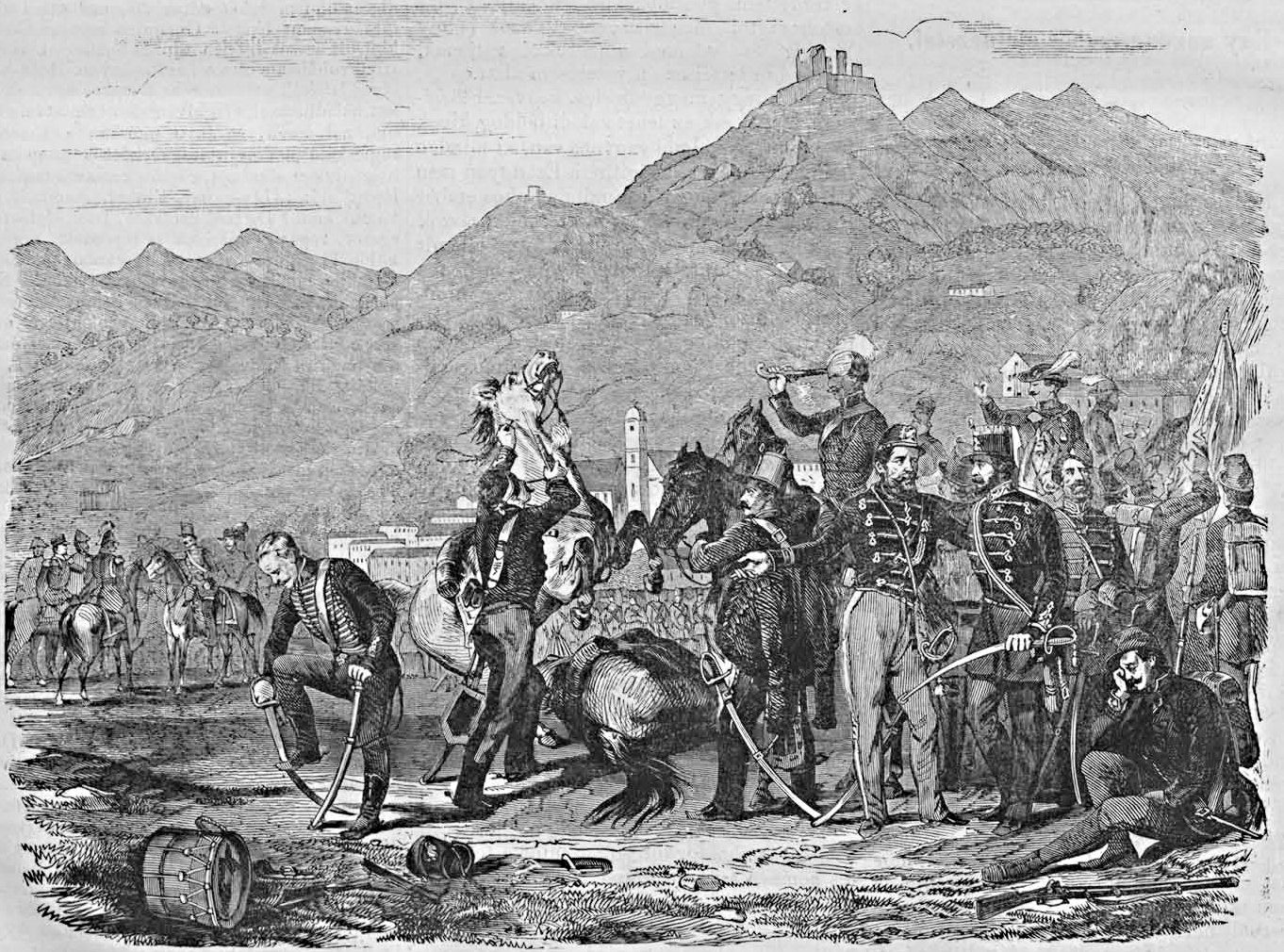
Surrender at Világos (Vasárnapi Újság ("Sunday News"), 15 August 1869)

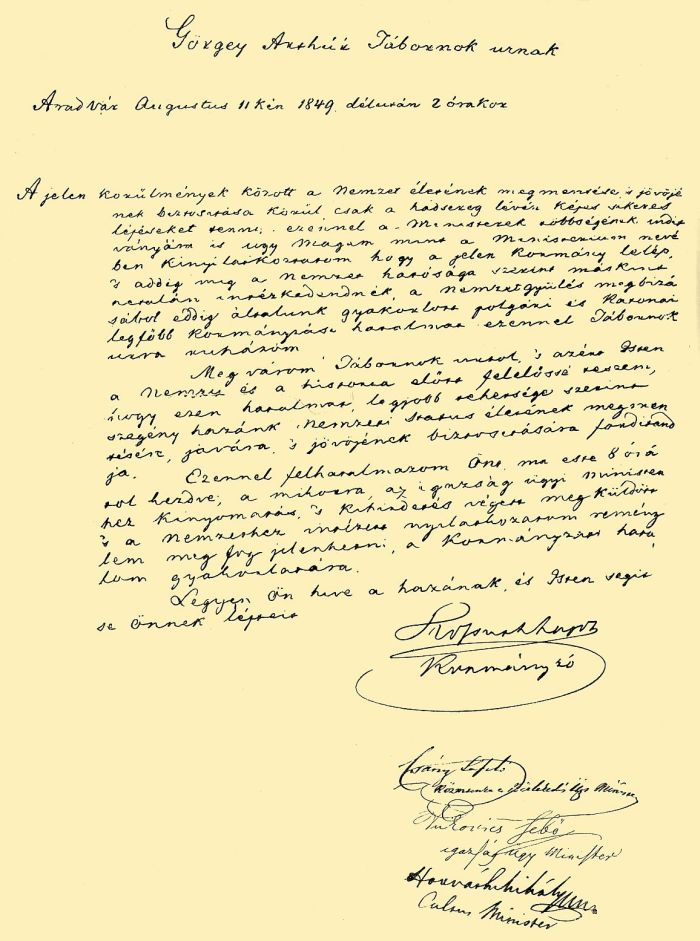
Lajos Kossuth's letter to Artúr Görgey resigning his command

After the Russians intervened in the conflict, it was only a matter of time before the Hungarians were defeated, as the Austro-Russians now had far greater military strength. The deciding point came at the Battle of Temesvár, which ended in a decisive Austrian victory, after which the Hungarians' choices essentially amounted to surrender or annihilation. On 21 July, Cavalry Captain Katlaroff and Count Theodor von Rüdiger delivered an offer from Russian General Chruloff to Görgey, who was at Rimaszombat (now Rimavská Sobota, Slovakia); the offer included total freedom for Hungarian officers and men.

László Batthyány and another officer delivered Görgey's response to Chruloff, in which Görgey demanded that all Hungarians get freedom, not only those who had served in the conflict. He would also gladly accept if one of the Russian princes would wear the Holy Crown of Hungary (Holy Crown of Saint Stephen).

== Surrender at Világos ==
The Hungarian Army surrendered to Russian General Rüdiger on 13 August 1849. At Bohus Castle, they signed the document of surrender. Görgey tried to show by the terms of the surrender that Hungary had been defeated by Russia, and not by Austria. This proved to be pointless as the Russians simply just handed them over to the Austrian authorities.

== Surrender of the other Hungarian troops and fortresses ==
In the final days of the Hungarian War of Independence of 1848-1849, after the Surrender at Világos on 13 August 1849 of the last important army of the Hungarians led by General Artúr Görgei, and the political leader of the Hungarian Revolution, Lajos Kossuth left the country on 17 August, there were still many troops and fortresses which continued to resist. But in the next two weeks, these troops surrendered one after another:

- 17 August: General János Damjanich surrenders the fortress of Arad to the Russians;
- 18 August: Lieutenant József Beke surrenders the remnants of the Army of Transylvania to the Russians at Déva;
- 19 August: General Arisztid Dessewffy and Colonel Vilmos Lázár surrender with the remnants of the IX. Corps at Karánsebes in front of the Austrians;
- 20 August: General Károly Vécsey surrenders with the V. corps at Borosjenő in front of the Russians;
- 21 August: Major Antal Frummer surrenders with a brigade of the IV. corps at Hátszeg in front of the Russians;
- 22 August: Major László Inczédy surrenders with his brigade at Belényes in front of the Russians;
- 24-25 August: Colonel Lajos Kazinczy surrenders with the troops of Northern Transylvania at Zsibó in front of the Russians;
- 26 August: Major Pál Mezősy surrenders the fortress of Munkács to the Russians;
- 7 September: General Pál Kiss surrenders the fortress of Pétervárad to the Austrians;
- 2 October: General György Klapka surrenders the fortress of Komárom to the Field Marshal Julius Jacob von Haynau;

== Aftermath ==
After the surrender and despite the Russian Emperor's pleas for clemency, the Austrians engaged in harsh reprisals against Hungary. They sentenced hundreds of soldiers and civilians to death, and imprisoned even more. Prisoners were conscripted into the Austrian Army.

On 6 October 1849, at Arad (today in Romania), the Austrians executed twelve Hungarian generals and one colonel, who are known as the 13 Martyrs of Arad. The same day, they executed Lajos Batthyány, the first Hungarian Prime Minister, by firing squad.
