= Petrovaradin Fortress =

- Петроварадинска тврђава / Petrovaradinska tvrđava (Serbian)
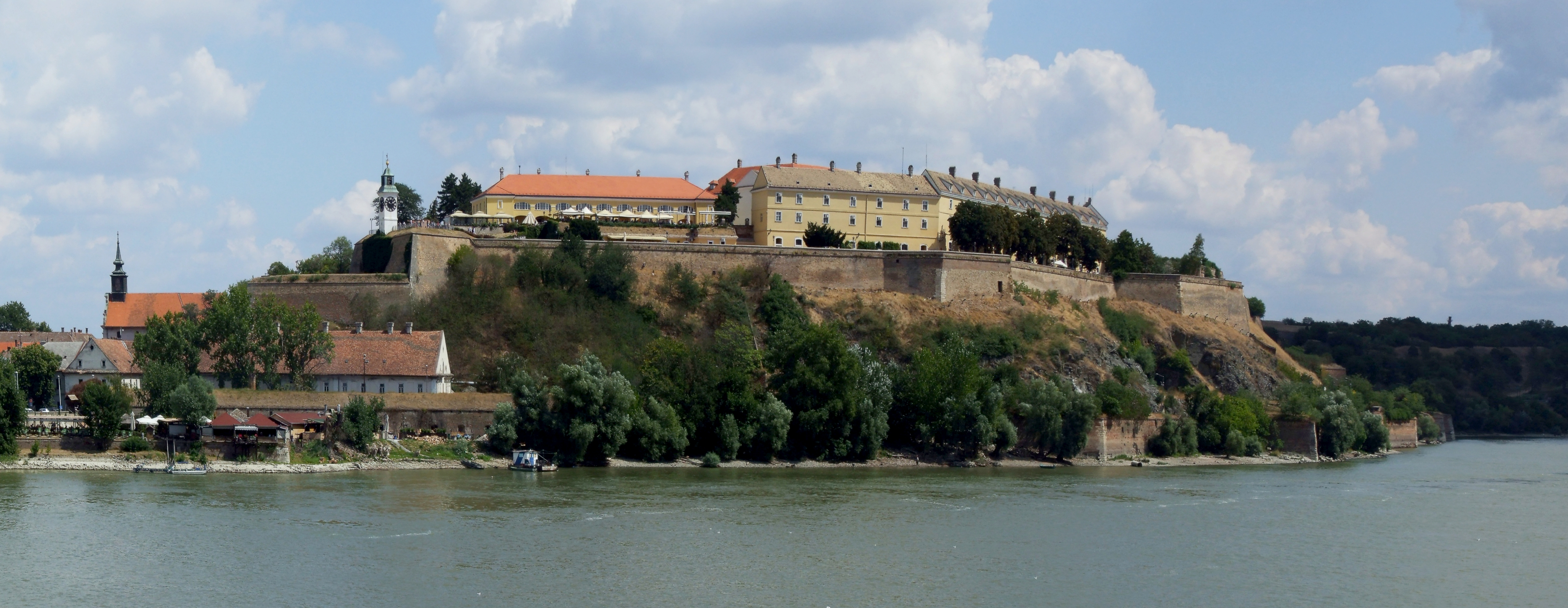
- Petrovaradin Fortress, on the Danube river, overlooking Novi Sad
- Interactive map of the Petrovaradin Fortress area

General information
- Architectural style: Baroque bastion fort
- Location: Petrovaradin, Serbia
- Coordinates: 45.2525°N 19.8625°E
- Construction started: 1692
- Completed: 1780
- Opened: 1780; 246 years ago
- Client: Charles Eugène de Croÿ

Cultural Heritage of Serbia
- Official name: Upper and Lower Petrovaradine Fortress with Podgrad
- Type: Immovable Cultural Heritage of Great Importance
- Designated: 1948-02-19
- Reference no.: PKIC41

Petrovaradin Fortress (Serbian: Петроварадинска тврђава, Petrovaradinska tvrđava, pronounced [pɛtrɔʋarǎdiːnskaː tʋř̩dʑaʋa]; Hungarian: Péterváradi vár), nicknamed "Gibraltar on/of the Danube", is a bastion fortress in the town of Petrovaradin, itself part of the City of Novi Sad, Serbia. It is located on the right bank of the Danube river. The cornerstone of the present-day southern part of the fortress was laid on 18 October 1692 by Charles Eugène de Croÿ. Petrovaradin Fortress has many tunnels as well as over 16 kilometres (9.9 mi) of preserved underground corridors and countermine system.

In 1991 Petrovaradin Fortress was added to Spatial Cultural-Historical Units of Great Importance list of the Republic of Serbia.

== History ==
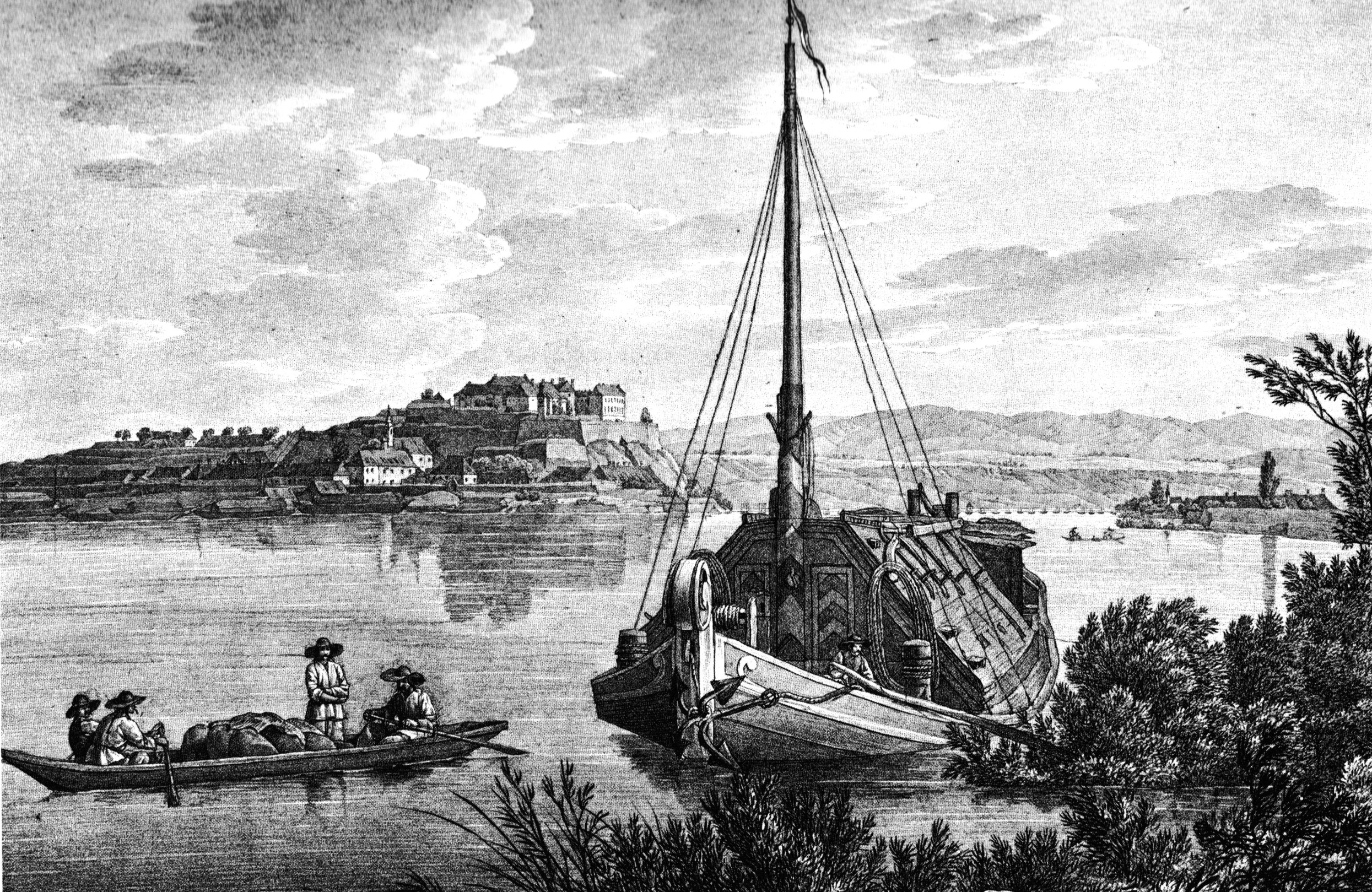
A gravure from 1821

Recent archeological discoveries have offered a new perspective not only on the history of Petrovaradin, but on the entire region. At the upper fortress, the remains of an earlier Paleolithic settlement dating from 19,000 to 15,000 BC has been discovered. With this new development it has been established that there has been a continuous settlement at this site from the Paleolithic age to the present. During the excavations carried out in 2005, archeologists also discovered another significant find. Examining remains from the early Bronze Age (c. 3000 BC), ramparts were discovered which testify that already at that time a fortified settlement existed at the Petrovaradin site.

The first larger fortifications were created in the 1st century BC, with the arrival of the Romans who built the fortress (Cusum), which was a part of the fortified borders (limes) along the Danube.

The turning point in the history of the area came in 1235 AD when King Béla IV of Hungary brought a group of the Order of Cistercians from France. This order of monks built the monastery Bélakút upon the remains of the Roman fortress of Cusum. The walls of this monastery were built between 1247 and 1252 and represent the fortifications at this site during the Middle Ages.

The fortress was strengthened due to the threat of Ottoman invasion. However the fortress fell after a two-week siege in 1526.

=== Austrian-Turkish wars ===
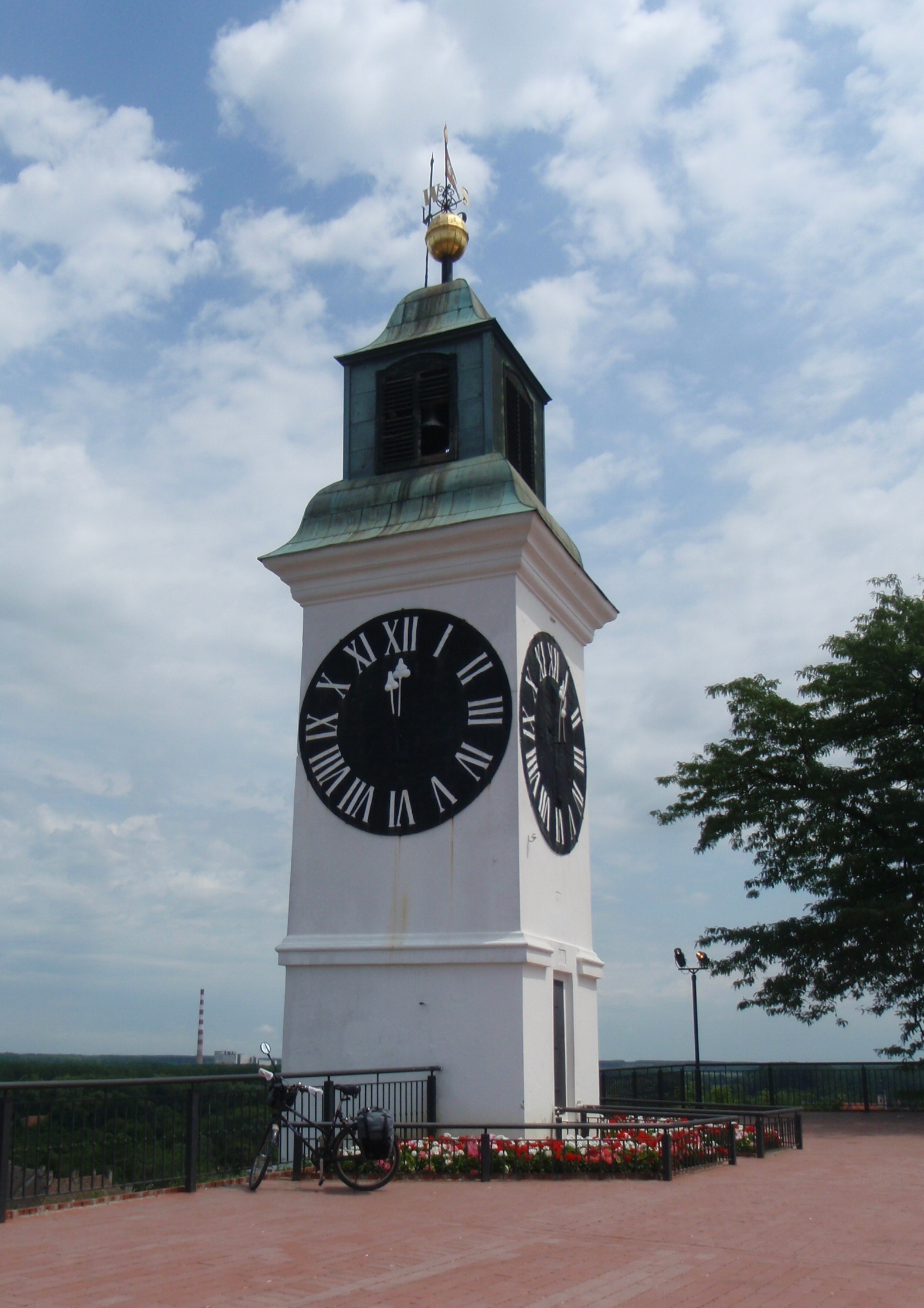
The clock tower, with its hands reversed so fishermen could better see the hour, is one of Novi Sad's major landmarks

The Austrian Army captured Petrovaradin after 150 years of Turkish control during the Great Turkish War in 1687. The Austrians began to tear down the old fortress and build new fortifications according to contemporary standards.

In 1692, the Hofkriegsrath ordered engineers to Petrovaradin to investigate the area in order to build a new fortress. Count Keysersfeld received both financial and personnel support.

The first plans for the fortress were designed by the engineer Colonel Count Mathias Keyserfeld and afterwards by Count Luigi Ferdinando Marsigli (1659–1730). The works in the field were also led by the engineer Colonel Michael Wamberg who died in 1703 and was buried in the church of the Franciscan monastery which today serves as part of the present-day military hospital.

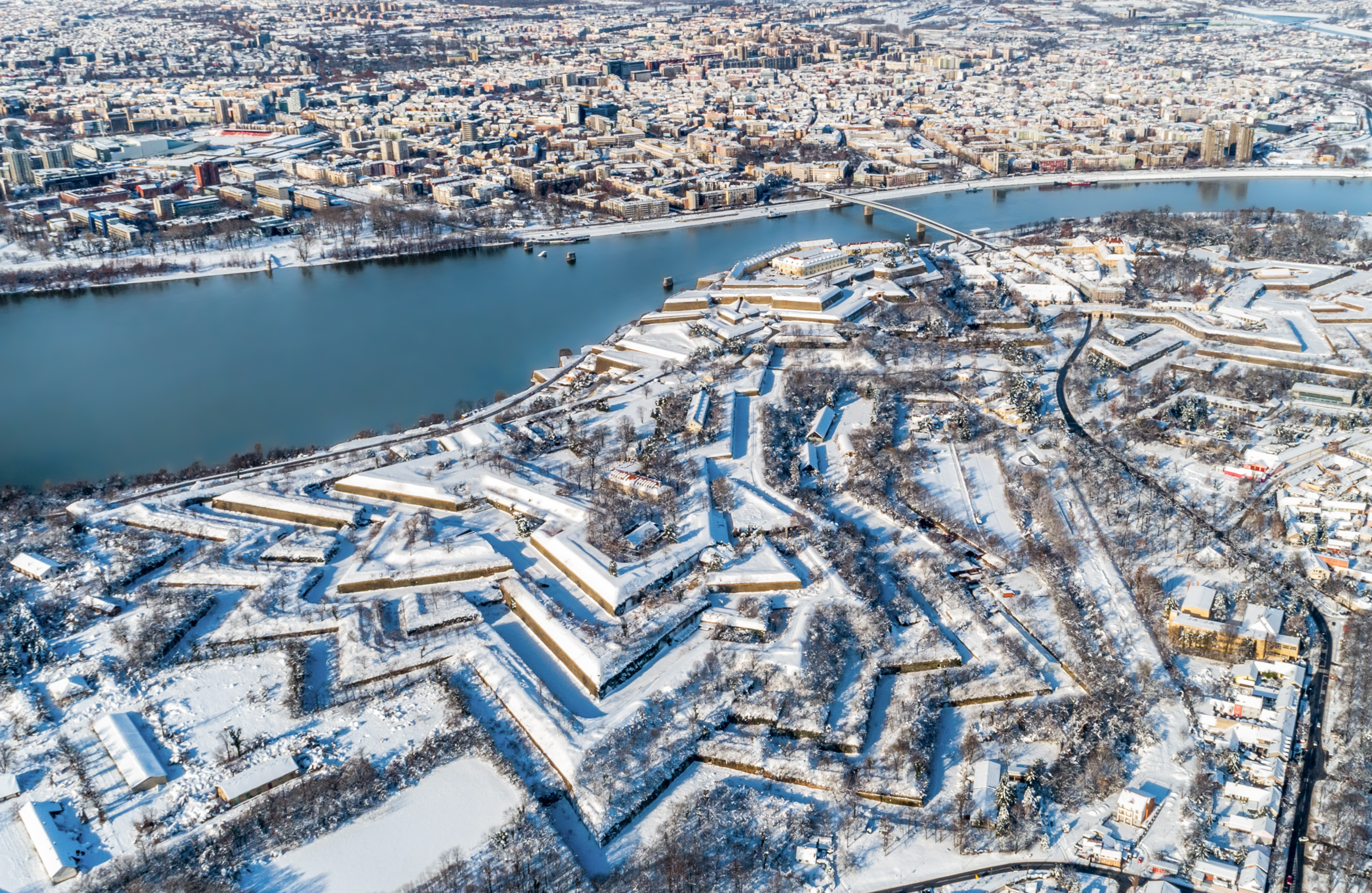
Petrovaradin Fortress during the winter

On September 9, 1694, the Grand Vizier Sürmeli Ali Pasha arrived at Petrovaradin Fortress from Belgrade. A siege of 23 days was laid on, however poor weather conditions in October forced the Turkish forces to retreat towards Belgrade with their task left unfinished.

The victory of the Austrians under the command of Prince Eugene of Savoy at Senta on September 11, 1697, resulted in creating the conditions for the conclusion of the peace at Karlowitz in 1699.

A new war with the Turks was imminent. The Austrian lack of interest in war, plus the war reparations suggested by the Austrians to the Turks in the interest of the Venetian Republic all served as reasons for the renewal of Turkish aggression towards Austria. In order to prepare for the upcoming battle, Prince Eugene ordered the concentration of Austrian troops around Futog under the temporary command of Count Johann Pálffy. The prince arrived personally on July 9. The entire Austrian army numbered 76,000 troops. In the meantime, the Turkish army concentrated 150,000 troops at Belgrade. The decisive battle between the Austrian and Turkish armies took place on August 5, 1716, at Petrovaradin. The Austrians were led by Prince Eugene and the Turks were under the command of Grand Vizier Silahdar Damat Ali Pasha. The victory of the Austrian army signalled the end of the Turkish threat to Central Europe.

=== Further works ===
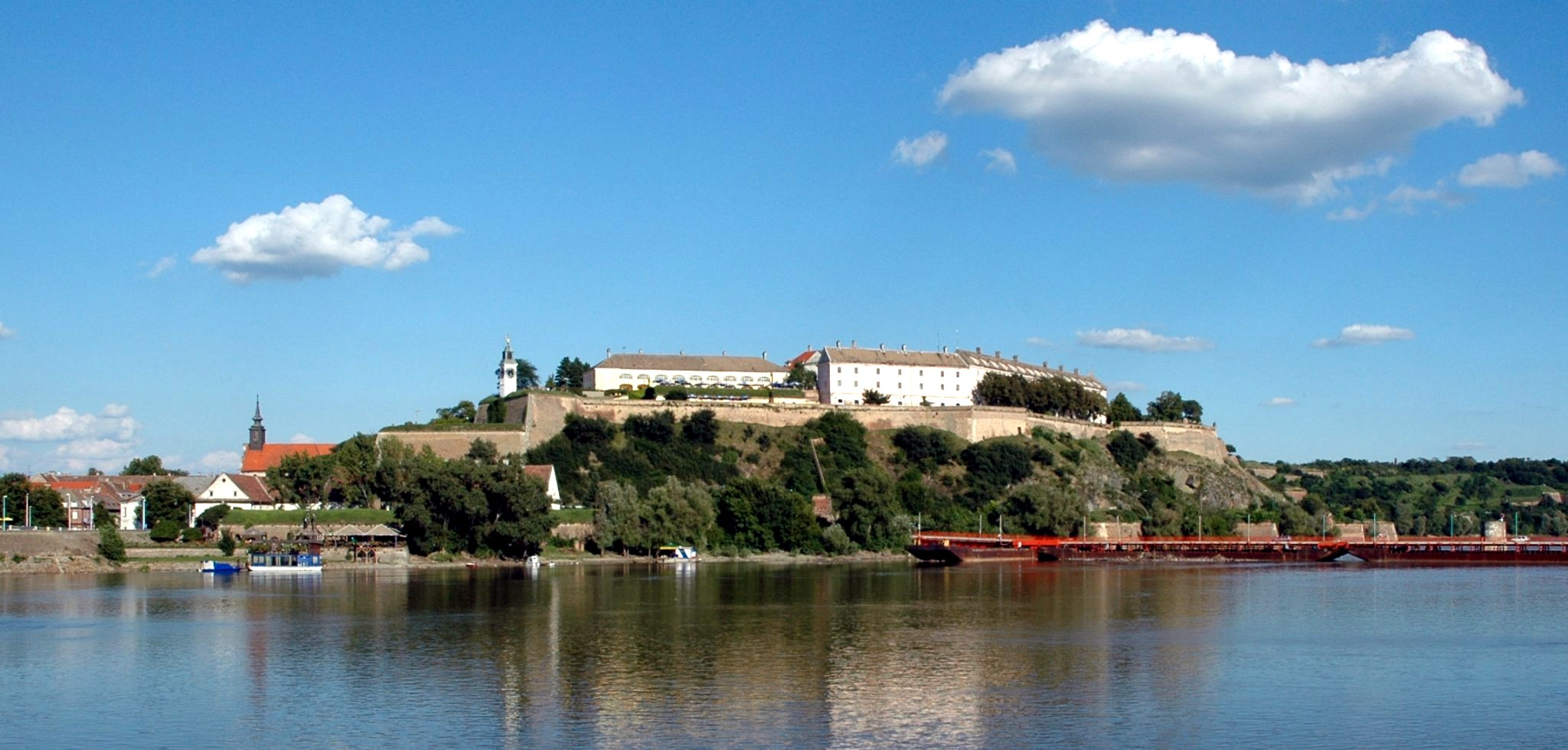
The Fortress from the Danube

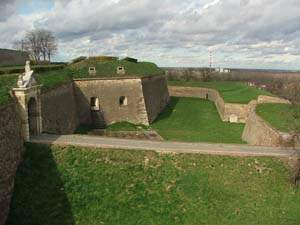
The Royal gate

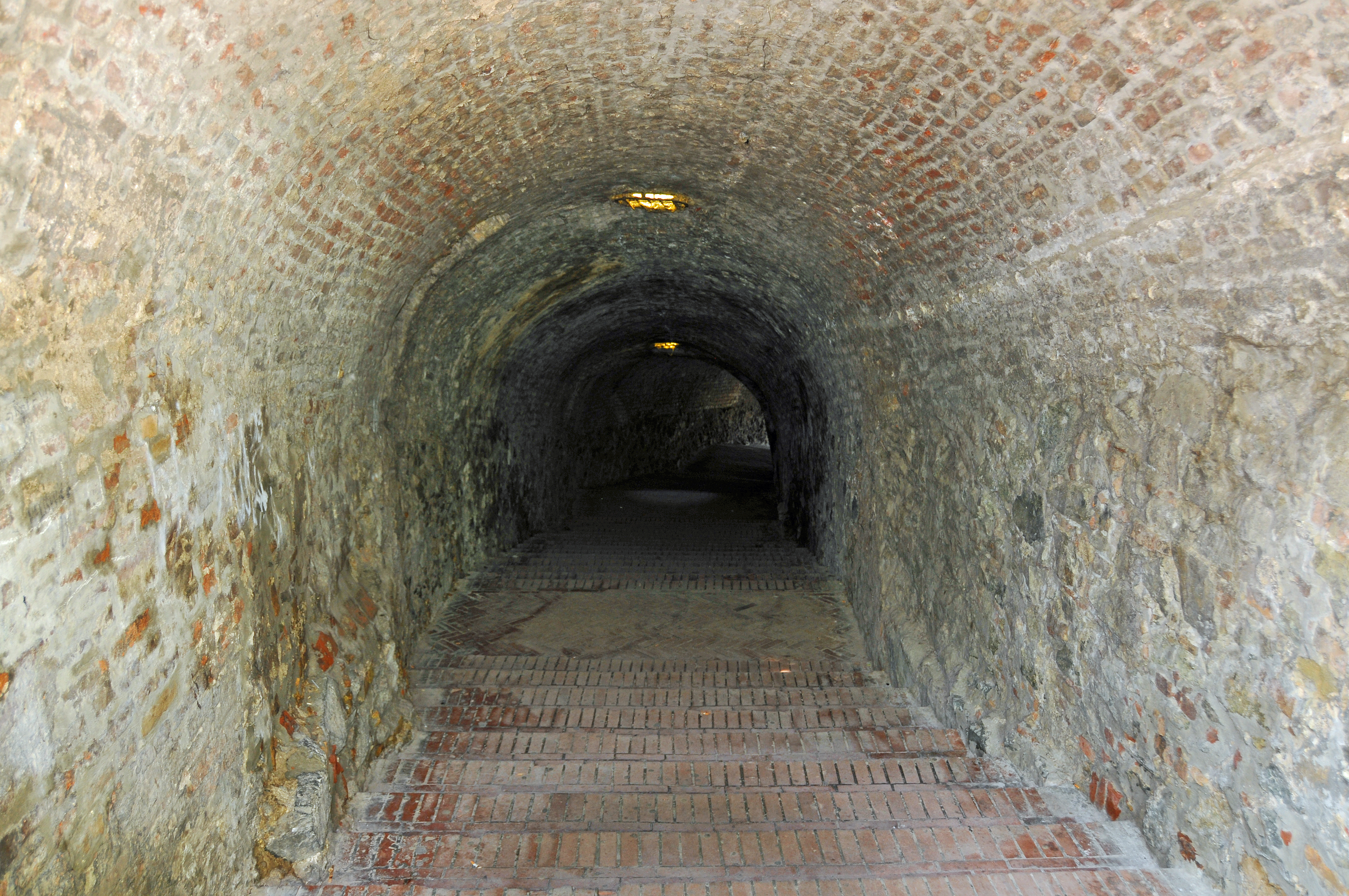
Underground passages

New plans were developed in 1751 and major works began in 1753 and lasted until 1776. When these works were under way, engineer Major Albrecht Heinrich Schroeder proposed a branched system of anti-mine tunnels to the High Military Council in early 1764. In March of the same year the plan was approved, but their construction was delayed for a number of years. During his visit to the Petrovaradin Fortress in May, 1768, Emperor Joseph II observed a military exercise with mine equipment carried out in his honor. The construction of this system of tunnels, having four levels, was completed in 1776 and the total length of the system was 16 kilometers (9.9 mi).

=== In the 19th and 20th centuries ===
After the completion of the Petrovaradin Fortress, there was never any further threat from Turkish forces. The last offensive military role the fortress was to play was during the Hungarian Revolution of 1848, when Austrian troops tried to force the Fortress to surrender after a blockade. The answer came in the form of the shelling of Novi Sad on June 12, when two-thirds of the city was destroyed.

During the following period, the fortress served as a military barracks and storage facility. Following World War I, Petrovaradin became a part of the Kingdom of Serbs, Croats and Slovenes (later known as Yugoslavia).

During these years, the old fortresses at Belgrade, Osijek, Karlovac and Slavonski Brod which were built in the 17th century were razed because they had lost their military significance. The engineer Colonel Dragoš Đelošević, who was responsible for the destruction of the fortresses, regarded Petrovaradin far too beautiful to suffer the fate of the other fortresses and spared it.

=== Clock tower ===
The minute and hour hands on the clock tower are reversed, with the small hand showing minutes, and the big hand showing hours. It was created as such so that fishermen on the Danube river can see the time from a long distance. The "reversed clock" as it is known, is one of the landmarks of Petrovaradin fortress.

=== EXIT festival ===
EXIT festival is an annual summer music festival that used to be held at the fortress since its inception in 2001. Since then, it has grown from the biggest festival in South-Eastern Europe, to one of the biggest in Europe. In 2025, due to cuts in government funding caused by the organizers' support for ongoing student protests, Organizers announced Exit would now take place at the Great Pyramid of Giza.

== See also ==
- Tourism in Serbia
- List of fortresses in Serbia

== Sources ==
- Đurić, Đorđe (2003). "Петроварадинска тврђава, дунавски Гибралтар на размеђу светова". Споменица Историјског архива "Срем". 2: 58–72. ISSN 1451-3676.
- Šeguljev, Nenad (2020). "Petrovaradinska tvrđava u zlatnom dobu vojne arhitekture". DANS - Časopis za arhitekturu i urbanizam.
- Vučković, Miljena; Dajč, Katarina (2019). "Analysis of the purposes, uses and users of the Petrovaradin Fortress" (PDF). Petro Varad In: Dossier. pp. 32-. ISBN 978-86-85871-40-5.
- "Petrovaradin Fortress (Novi Sad, Serbia): Tourism Spatial Planning and Design of The Upper Town for the Function of Cultural Tourism" (PDF). Turizam. 15 (2): 65–76. 2011.
- "Petrovaradin Fortress" (PDF). Turistička organizacija Novi Sad. 2024.
