= Josip Jelačić =

Ban of Croatia between 1848 and 1859

Count Josip Jelačić de Bužim
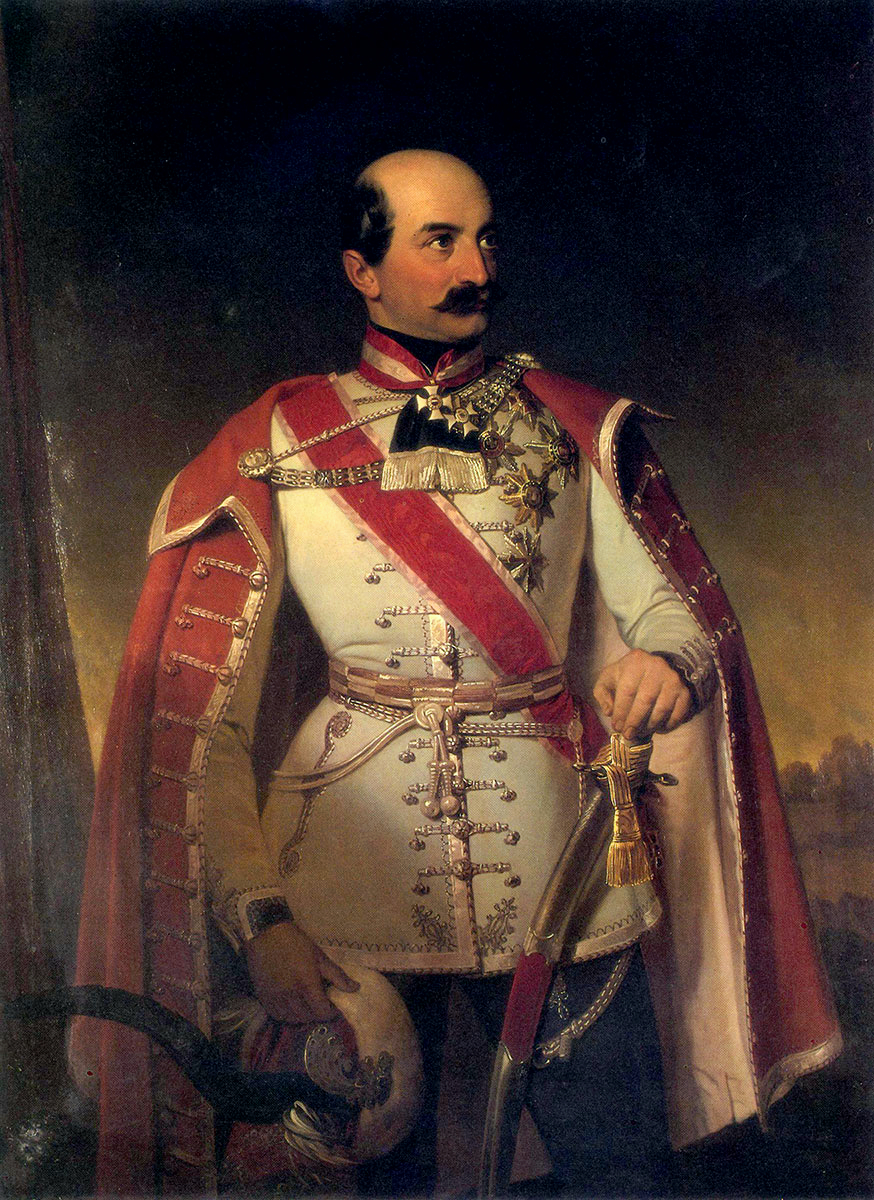
- Portrait by Ivan Zasche

Ban of Croatia
- In office 23 March 1848 – 20 April 1859
- Monarchs: Ferdinand I of Austria (1848); Franz Joseph I of Austria
- Deputy: Mirko Lentulaj
- Preceded by: Juraj Haulik
- Succeeded by: Johann Baptist Coronini-Cronberg

Governor of Dalmatia
- In office 1848–1859
- Preceded by: Ludwig von Welden
- Succeeded by: Lazar Mamula

Personal details
- Born: 16 October 1801 Petrovaradin, Slavonian Military Frontier, Kingdom of Hungary (modern Serbia)
- Died: 20 May 1859 (aged 57) Zagreb, Kingdom of Croatia, Austrian Empire (modern Croatia)
- Resting place: Novi Dvori, Zaprešić, Croatia
- Spouse: Countess Sofija Jelačić (née von Stockau)
- Relations: Franjo Jelačić (father)
- Education: Theresian Military Academy
- Occupation: Politician
- Awards: Military Order of Maria Theresa; Order of St. Andrew

Military service
- Allegiance: Austrian Empire
- Branch/service: Imperial-Royal Army
- Years of service: 1819–1859
- Rank: Feldzeugmeister
- Commands: Imperial-Royal in Hungary and Croatia
- Battles/wars: Bosnian border raids in the Austrian Empire; Vienna Uprising; Hungarian Revolution of 1848: Battle of Pákozd; Battle of Schwechat; Battle of Mór; Battle of Kápolna; Battle of Tápióbicske; Battle of Isaszeg; Battle of Káty; Battle of Kishegyes; Siege of Petrovaradin

Count Josip Jelačić von Bužim (16 October 1801 – 20 May 1859; also spelled Jellachich, Jellačić or Jellasics; Croatian: Josip grof Jelačić Bužimski; Hungarian: Jelasics József) was a Croatian lieutenant field marshal in the Imperial Austrian Army and politician. He was the Ban of Croatia between 23 March 1848 and 19 April 1859. He was a member of the House of Jelačić and a noted army general, remembered for his military campaigns during the Revolutions of 1848 and for his abolition of serfdom in Croatia.

== Early life and military ==
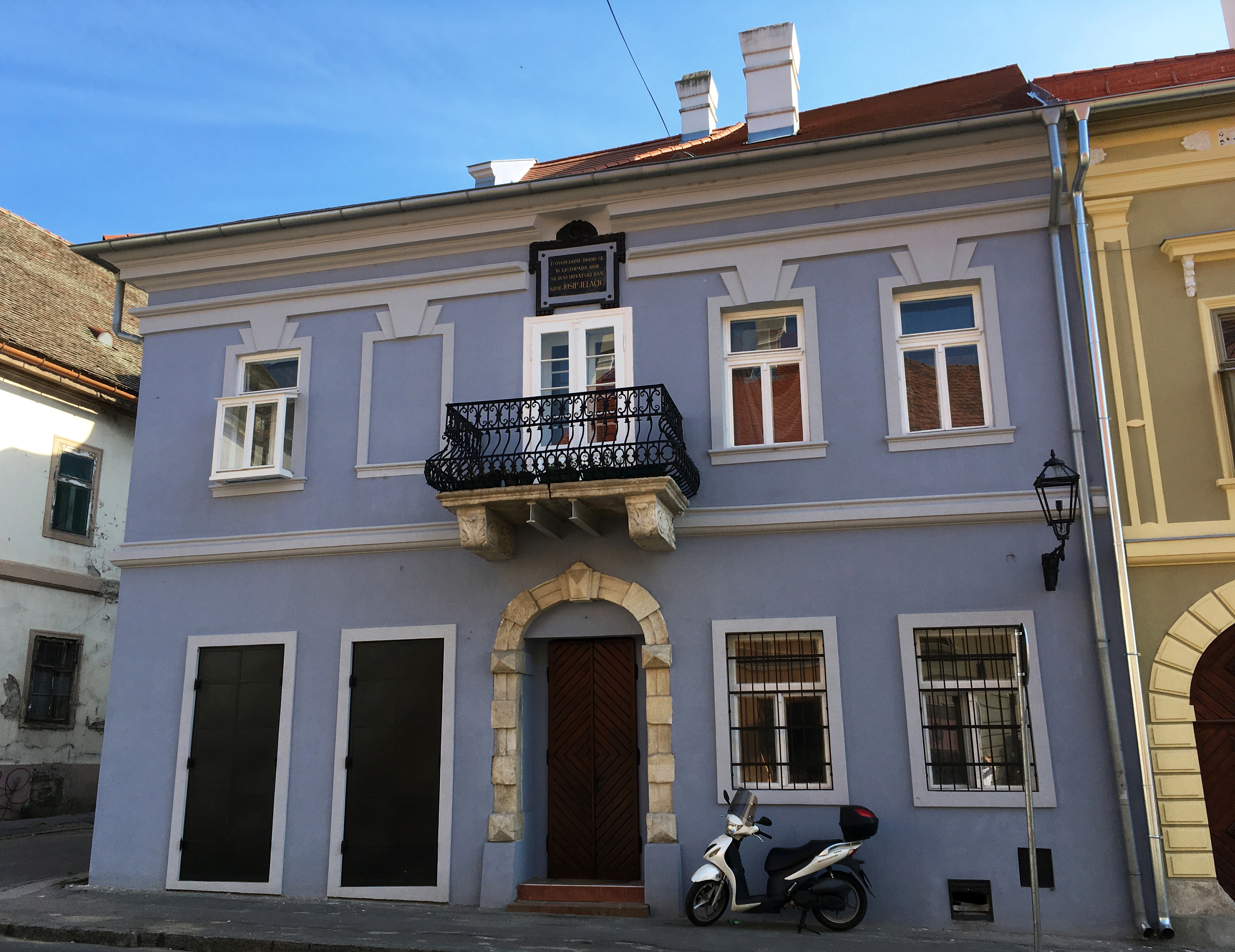
The birth house of Ban Josip Jelačić was bought from private owners by the Serbian state and given as a gift to the Croatian minority in 2020.

The son of Croatian Baron Franjo Jelačić Bužimski (or in other documents, Franz Freiherr Jelačić von Bužim) (1746–1810), a Feldmarschall-Leutnant (Lieutenant Field Marshal), and his wife, Baroness Anna Portner von Höflein, the honorific Bužimski refers to Bužim, a location in the Cazin region, that was used by the Jelačić family.

Jelačić was born in the town of Petrovaradin which was a part of the Slavonian Military Frontier of the Habsburg monarchy and today it is part of Vojvodina, Serbia. Josip Jelačić was educated in Vienna at the Theresian Military Academy, where he received a versatile education, showing particular interest in history and foreign languages. He was fluent in all South-Slavic languages, as well as German, Italian, French, and Hungarian. On the 11th of March 1819 Jelačić joined the Austrian army with the rank of lieutenant in the Vinko Freiherr von Knežević Regiment, named for his uncle.

In 1819, he served as a second lieutenant in the 3rd Cavalry Regiment in Galicia. In 1822, he fell ill and stayed in his parents' house in Zagreb. In 1825 he returned to his regiment in Vienna, where he was appointed first lieutenant and aide to the brigade commander. In 1830, he became a lieutenant captain in the Ogulin regiment.

On 17 October 1835, he led a military campaign against Bosnian Ottoman troops in Velika Kladuša for which he received a medal. He was promoted to major on 20 February 1837 in the Freiherr von Gollner regiment. In May 1841 he received the rank of lieutenant colonel in the 1st Croatian Frontier Guard Regiment in Glina, Croatia. On October 18, he was promoted to colonel.

On 22 March 1848, Jelačić was promoted to major-general, and simultaneously the Sabor (the National Assembly of Croatia) elected him as Ban of Croatia. The Sabor also declared that the first elections or representatives to the assembly would be held in May 1848. Shortly after, he was promoted to lieutenant field-marshal, becoming the commander of all Habsburg troops in Croatia.

During this time, Jelačić was a proponent of the Illyrian movement.

== Hungarian Revolution of 1848 ==
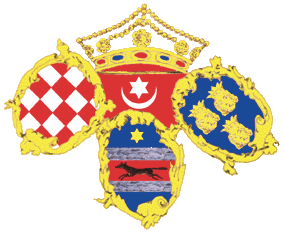
Flag of Ban Josip Jelačić, 1848

Jelačić supported independence for Croatia from the Austrian throne. However, in pursuit of this goal Jelačić sought to support this goal by ingratiating himself with the Austrian throne by supporting Austrian interests in putting down revolutionary movements in northern Italy in 1848 and in opposing the Hungarian Revolution of 1848–1849. Consequently, Jelačić's reputation differs in Austria where he was looked upon as a rebel seeking to break up the Austrian Empire, while in Croatia he is deemed a national hero.

He travelled to Vienna to take oaths to become counsel of Austrian Emperor, Ferdinand I, but refused to take the oath as Ban of Croatia, because it was a Hungarian dependent territory. The relations between the Kingdom of Hungary and the Austrian government deteriorated after the outbreak of the Hungarian Revolution on 15 March 1848. But Jelačić later took the oath as Ban of Croatia on 5 June 1848. Because of the absence of Juraj Haulik, the Catholic Archbishop of Zagreb, he took the oath before the Josif Rajačić, the Orthodox Archbishop of Karlovci and Serbian Patriarch.

Jelačić, now Ban, supported the Croatian aim to maintain autonomy from the Kingdom of Hungary. Jelačić proceeded to sever all official ties of Croatia from Hungary. The Austrian Imperial Court initially opposed this act as one of disobedience and separatism, declaring him to be a rebel and the Sabor to be illegitimate. But the court soon realized Jelačić and his Croatian army were an ally against the newly formed Batthyány Government. Travelling back to Zagreb in April, Jelačić refused to cede to this new government, refused any cooperation, and called for elections to the Sabor on 25 March 1848.

== Croatian Parliament, the Sabor ==
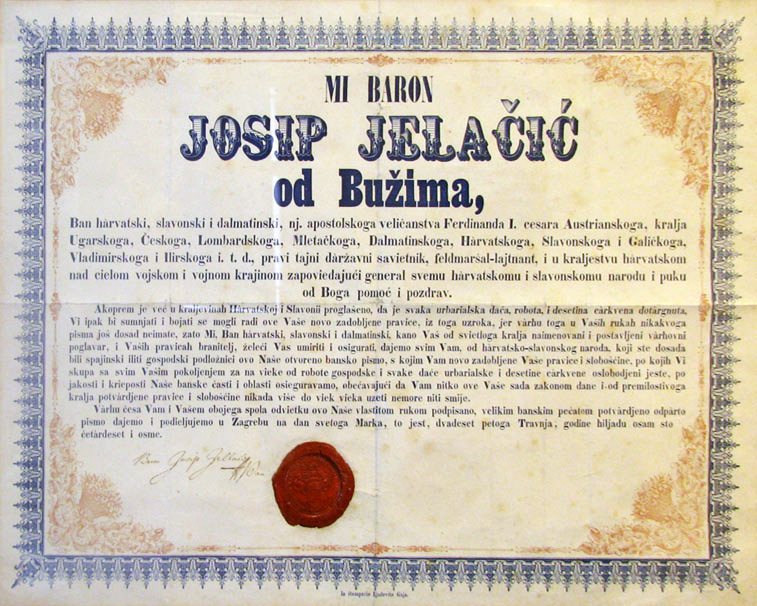
Ban Josip Jelačić's proclamation abolishing serfdom

The Sabor – now acting as the National Assembly – declared the following demands to the Habsburg emperor:

1. The union of all Croatian provinces (Croatian-Slavonian Kingdom, Istria and Dalmatia).
2. Separation from the Kingdom of Hungary.
3. Abolition of serfdom.
4. Full civil rights.
5. Affirmation of the equality of nations.

Many of his points about civil rights were part of the Hungarian twelve points, and were already enacted by the Batthyány Government.

The Sabor strongly opposed the "massive nationalist Magyarization politics of the Kingdom of Hungary from the Carpathians to Adria, which the newly formed government represents, especially Lajos Kossuth."

On 8 April Jelačić took his oath as ban and was appointed a field-marshal-lieutenant and made commander of the Military Frontier. On 19 April 1848 Jelačić proclaimed the union of Croatian provinces, and the separation from the Kingdom of Hungary. At the same time, he proclaimed unconditional loyalty to the Habsburg monarchy. The Croatian Constitution of 24 April 1848 declared "languages of all ethnicities should be inviolable".

On serfdom, it was apparent that changing the status of the Croatian peasantry would have to wait until the end of the revolution. Jelačić kept up the institution of the Military Frontier so he could draft more soldiers. The people in the region protested to this, but Ban Jelačić quashed the dissent by summary courts martial and by executing many dissenters.

In May, Jelačić established the Bansko Vijeće ("Ban Council"). Its scope of authority covered ministerial tasks including Internal Affairs, Justice, Schools and Education, Religion, Finance, and Defense, so this council was acting as a governing body in Croatia. The new Sabor was summoned on 5 June.

== Intermediary discussions ==
The Austrian emperor called Jelačić to Innsbruck, to which the Imperial Court had fled, and the Emperor there told him that the Croatian and Slavonian troops in the Italian provinces wanted to join forces with those in Croatia, but that this would weaken the forces in Italy. So Jelačić called on all troops stationed in the Italian provinces to remain calm and to stay put.

The Austrian court did not grant the separation of Croatia from Hungary. During his travels back to Zagreb, Jelačić read in the Lienz railway station that on 10 June the Emperor had relieved him of all his positions. But Jelačić was still loyal to the Emperor, and kept relations with the Imperial Court, especially with Archduchess Sophia, the mother of Franz Joseph I of Austria.

Immediately after arriving at Zagreb, Jelačić got the order to join the discussions with the Hungarian government in Vienna. During these, Jelačić stated that his position was derived from the Pragmatic Sanction of 1713, while Lajos Batthyány called him "a separatist" seeking to break away from the Habsburg Monarchy. Jelačić called this a "rebellion". Batthyány warned Jelačić that this could mean war. Jelačić stopped the discussions, saying that "civil war is the worst that could happen" – but that he "would not be intimidated by this, however shocking it might be to hear". Negotiations were closed with Batthyány saying "see you (on the river) Drava" and with Jelačić responding "say rather on the Danube."

Jelačić returned to Croatia. Hungarian troops had gathered on the border and hostile proclamations were made against him.

== War against the Kingdom of Hungary ==
In August, Jelačić proclaimed a decree for the Croatians, where he denied accusations of separating Croatia in the name of Panslavism. In the decree he said

Being a son of the [Croatian] nation, being the supporter of liberty, and being subject to Austria, I am faithfully committed to the constitutional Emperor of the Empire and its Kings, and I long for a great, free Austria

His closing words were:

The Hungarian Government, as it is evident, would not like to agree on this; they insist on their separatist moves, which means they struggle to dismantle our Empire. It is the command of our duty and honour to go till the ultimate and to call for arms against them. And we, not sparing our wealth, blood and life, will stand for our rightful demands and sacred deeds.

Jelačić felt disorder growing in the Austrian Empire, and decided on immediate action. On 11 September at Varaždin he crossed the River Drava. His fighting force was limited, due to many of his soldiers fighting in Northern Italy.

Jelačić occupied Međimurje (Hungarian: Muraköz), which was mostly Croatian. The two forces were poorly armed because of the rapid engagement. Materiel was not well organised, so the advance into Hungarian territory was difficult. Supplies were taken from the local population.

The enthusiasm of the Croatian troops grew when at Siófok the Ban received a letter from Ferdinand I cancelling the decree removing him from all positions, also promoting him to be general commander of all troops in Hungary.

During his march toward Pest and Buda (now conjoined as the towns of Budapest), Jelačić got a message from Archduke Stephen, situated in Veszprém, to inform him of the decision of the Emperor that Lajos Batthyány was approved to set up a new government, and calling him to stop the troops, and to discuss further actions at his office. Jelačić replied he could not stop his army then, but was prepared for discussions with the archduke at the port of Balatonszemes. The meeting did not take place. According to Austrian sources, advisors to Jelačić persuaded him not to attend, because of a threat of assassination by agents of the Hungarian Government. After this fiasco, Palatine Stephen resigned and left Hungary, under the Emperor's orders.

=== Battle of Pákozd ===
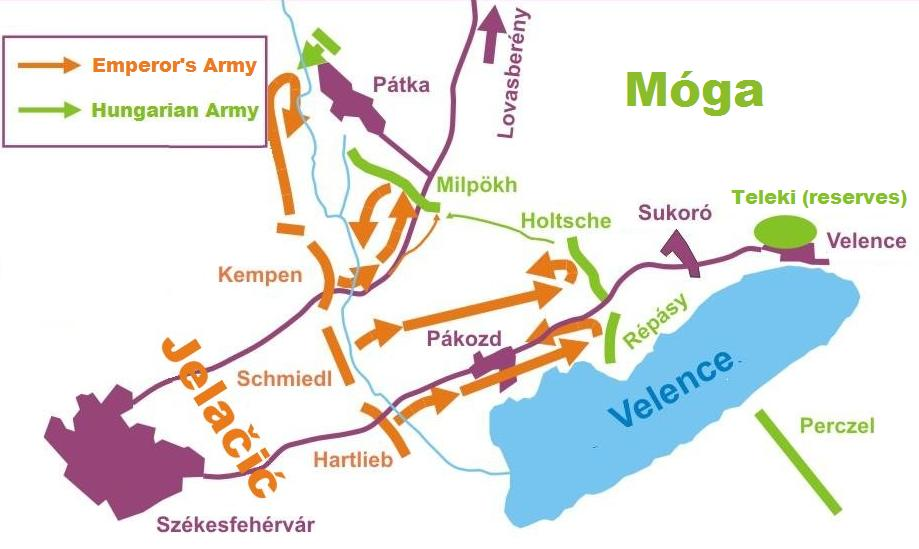
The battle in the Pákozd triangle

Jelačić's army occupied Székesfehérvár on 26 September 1848. The same day the Emperor appointed lieutenant-general Count Franz Philipp von Lamberg as general commanding all troops in Hungary, but this was annulled by the Hungarian Parliament. Lajos Kossuth called the Hungarians for resistance, and the Országos Honvédelmi Bizottmány (National Homeguarding Committee) was given the power of execution. Lamberg, trying to take over the command of the Imperial Hungarian troops was identified and killed.

Jelačić advanced onward, reached Lake Velence on 29 September, where he met Hungarian troops. After the first strikes, lieutenant-general János Móga withdrew to north to Sukoró. Jelačić demanded Móga stand against the rebels, and "get back to the road of honour and duty", but Móga refused, and his army attacked Jelačić between his position and Pákozd.

After the Battle of Pákozd, on 30 September Jelačić asked for a three-day ceasefire; he wanted to use these days to wait for Roth's army. He assessed the greater numbers of the Hungarian troops and the poor armaments and tiredness of his own troops. On 1 October the supply routes to Croatia were cut by rebels, so he advanced toward Vienna. On 3 October Móga was pursuing after Jelačić, but did not want to make an attack.

On 4 October, Ferdinand I of Austria reappointed Jelačić as the general commander of all troops in Hungary, and dissolved the Hungarian Diet.

=== Vienna Revolt ===
Austrian Minister of War Theodor Baillet von Latour called the guards in Vienna to join the troops of Jelačić, but this caused an uprising in Vienna on 6 October in which Latour was killed.

On 7 October Hungarian General Mór Perczel defeated the armies of General Roth and Josip Filipović, and took them prisoner. The Hungarian Parliament annulled the Emperor's decree of October 4.

Jelačić moved onward to Vienna to join the troops around the city. Under Lieutenant-General Kuzman Todorović, he organised a body of 14,000 soldiers to move south to Styria to protect Croatia.

The Viennese revolution committee called for aid from the Hungarian Government. On 10 October at Laaer Berg near Vienna, Jelačić joined Austrian troops led by Auersperg, and the army was strengthened with troops from Bratislava, a regiment of Ludwig von Wallmoden-Gimborn and Franz Joseph I of Austria's regiment. Jelačić's forces were soon under Field Marshal Windisch-Grätz. On 21 October, seeing trouble ahead, Móga stopped at the Austrian border, and the revolution in Vienna was suppressed. Jelačić's forces were fighting in the Landstrasse, Erdberg and Weissgerber suburbs.

=== The winter campaign of Windisch-Grätz ===
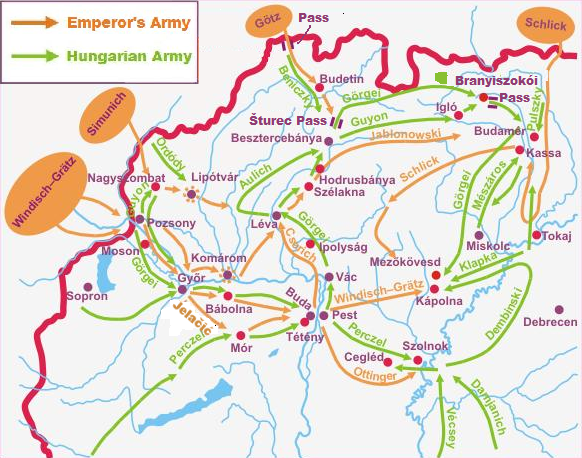
Movements in the Winter Campaign

On 21 October – too late – Lajos Kossuth ordered Móga to turn back to Vienna, they met forces of Jelačić at Schwechat on 30 October. A day of artillery fighting broke out, and Jelačić initiated a counterattack in the evening. Led by General Karl von Zeisberg, the attack pushed back the Hungarian forces and defeated them. After this defeat, Móga stepped down as general commander, and Kossuth nominated general Artúr Görgey in his place.

On 2 December 1848 Ferdinand I of Austria abdicated, and Franz Joseph I of Austria was installed as Emperor. On 13 December Windisch-Grätz crossed the Hungarian border. On 16 December, Jelačić also crossed the border and defeated Hungarian troops at Parndorf, later occupying Mosonmagyaróvár and Győr. Being informed that Mór Perczel was stationed at Mór, Jelačić made a detour toward this city and defeated the Hungarian troops there, taking into custody 23 officers and 2,000 honvéd. With this battle, Pest-Buda became vulnerable, so the Hungarian government fled to Debrecen. Görgey could resist the march of Jelačić at Tétény for some time, but on 5 January Windisch-Grätz, together with Jelačić occupied Pest-Buda.

=== Later military campaigns ===
After the occupation of Pest and Buda the larger campaigns were over. Windisch-Grätz declared a military dictatorship, caught the Hungarian leader Lajos Batthyány and asked for surrender. He moved to Debrecen but was stopped by Perczel at Szolnok and Abony. Kossuth nominated Henryk Dembiński to replace Artúr Görgey, and started a strategic counterattack but was defeated near Kápolna.

Windisch-Grätz ordered Jelačić to quick march to Jászfényszaru. On 4 April Klapka attacked him but at Tápióbicske the bayonets of Jelačić pushed them back. On 5 March Damjanich reoccupied Szolnok. Jelačić now got a new order to turn from Jászfényszaru and head to Gödöllő. On 4 April Jelačić met János Damjanich at Tápióbicske and was defeated. On 6 April Windisch-Grätz and Jelačić, were defeated in the Battle of Isaszeg and retreated.

After the defeat, Windisch-Grätz was relieved of general command, and was replaced by General Welden and later Julius Jacob von Haynau. Jelačić was ordered to gather the scattered troops in southern Hungary and to organise an army. This consisted of 15,800 infantry, 5,100 cavalry and 74 cannon, and moved to Osijek immediately. During his march south, Jelačić had to suppress rebellions, especially in Pécs. After a series of wrong decisions, Jelačić's army could not join up with the Emperor's, so it was put to defensive fights.

=== Battles in Slavonia ===
In May, 1849 Jelačić moved from Osijek to Vukovar, Ilok, Sremski Karlovci, Tovarnik and Irig. He set up base at Ruma.

He was in a bad situation, as the Austrians were calling for the help of Russian Empire to suppress the Hungarians and the support from Vienna dissolved. Jelačić was lacking proper materiel, and many of his troops died of cholera.

The Serbian troops, led by Kuzman Todorović, had to surrender strategic points to the Honvédség (Hungarian Army). The Hungarians occupied and fortified Petrovaradin, where the troops received supplies because the population supported the Hungarian revolution. In April, Mór Perczel occupied Srbobran and broke up the encirclement of Petrovaradin, defeated Todorović so he could occupy Pančevo and finally, together with Józef Bem, occupied Temes County (now Timiș County, Romania).

Jelačić, cut off from all supplies, fortified his armies for defence and fought small battles in Slavonia. The supplies from the Austrian Empire were stuck at Stari Slankamen. In June he decided to break out and advance to Sombor – Dunaföldvár. During his march, on 6 June, Perczel attacked him near Kać and Žabalj. He defeated Perczel, and marched forward, but could not occupy Novi Sad.

On 24 June he successfully occupied Óbecse, but was retaken by Hungarians on 28th. This way Jelačić could not dislodge the Hungarian forces from Bačka. On 6 July Richard Guyon drove out the Croatian troops at Mali Iđoš. On 14 July Hungarians took control over Feketić and Lovćenac, defeating Jelačić in the Battle of Hegyes and forcing him to retreat. This was the last battle in the region.

After Timișoara fell, Jelačić joined Haynau's troops, and after the end of the revolution, he travelled to Vienna to take part in discussions of reorganising Croatia, Slavonia and the frontier regions.

== After the Revolution ==
When peace was restored, Jelačić returned to Croatia where he was treated as national hero, the saviour of the homeland.

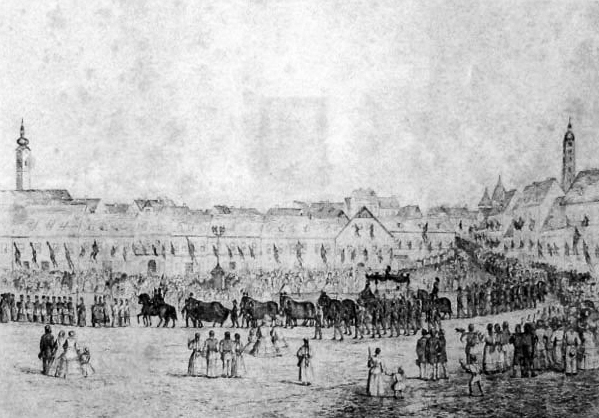
Funeral procession in Zagreb

After the war the Empire's new constitution stripped the local authorities in Hungary of their political power, but this punishment also affected Croatia despite its assistance to the imperial cause during the revolution. Nevertheless, Jelačić implemented the new Constitution (published 4 March 1849), and proceeded to outlaw various newspapers that published anti-Austrian opinions. In 1851, when Baron Alexander von Bach came to power in the Kingdom of Hungary, Jelačić worked under him and made no objections to the Germanization of Croatia. He remained in office until his death.

== Death and legacy ==
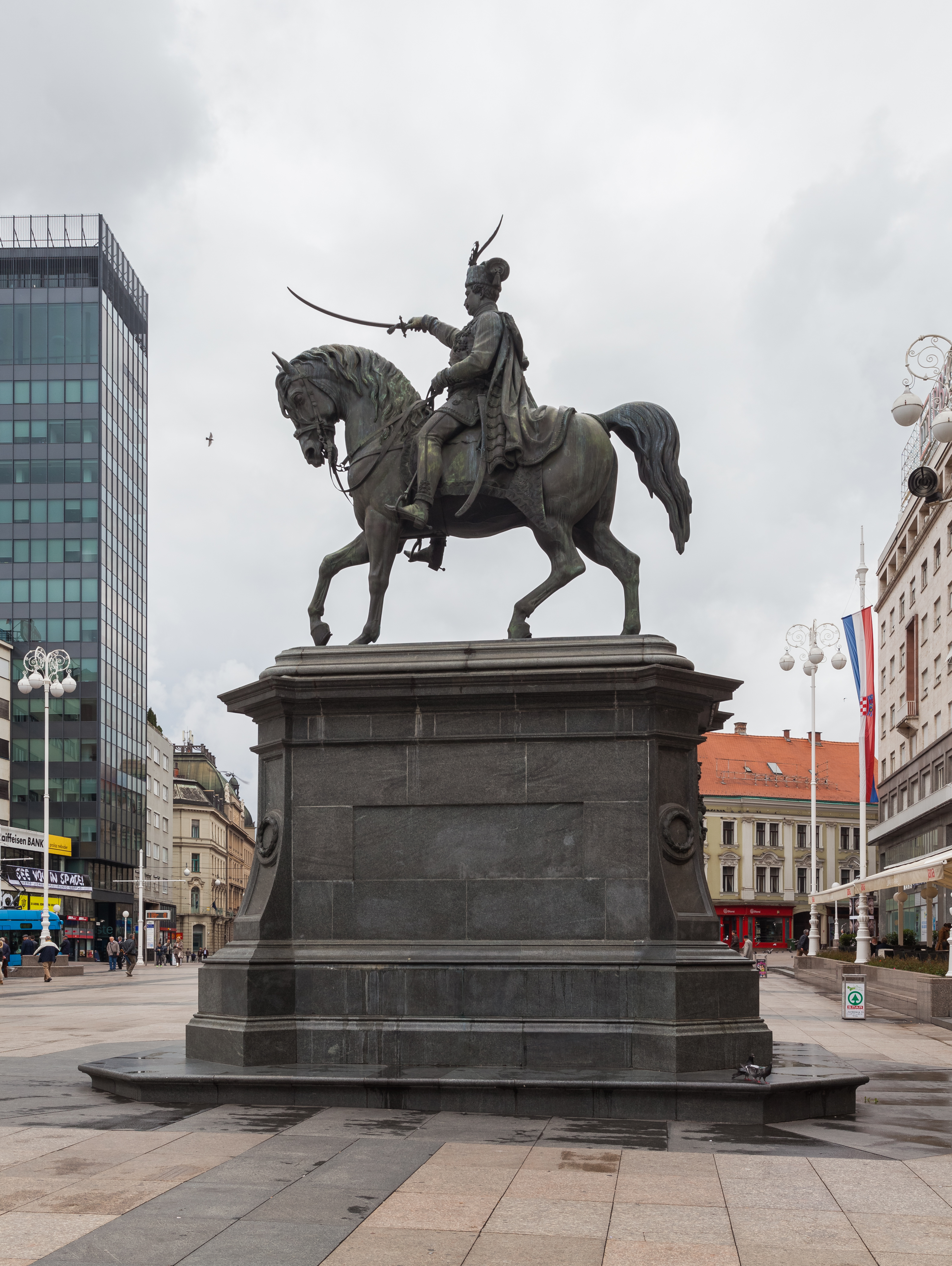
Statue of Ban Jelačić in Zagreb

Jelačić died on 20 May 1859 in Zagreb, after an illness. He is buried in Zaprešić, in a grave near his castle.

In his time and shortly after, Jelačić was a fairly unpopular figure among the Croatian political elite, including Ante Starčević and others, and especially among the people who suffered losses due to his military campaigns and had little benefit from his economic measures.

Today, Jelačić is considered an important and admirable figure in Croatian history, alongside Ante Starčević, and Stjepan Radić, the Croatian political leader until 1928. The central square of the city of Zagreb was named Ban Jelačić Square in 1848, and a statue of him by Anton Dominik Fernkorn was erected in the square in 1866, removed under Communist rule in 1947, and reinstalled in 1990, after the fall of Communism.

In 2020, the home in which Jelačić was born was returned to the Croatian minority to be used as a cultural centre after being purchased by the Serbian government. It was officially opened on the 219th anniversary of Jelačić's birth in a ceremony attended by the President of Serbia Aleksandar Vučić and Croatia's Minister of Foreign Affairs Gordan Grlić Radman.

The patriotic song "Ustani bane" (Rise, Ban) was written to glorify Jelačić.

In Hungary, he is a very unpopular historical figure. He is often referred to as "Jelasics the coward," who "runs back to Vienna with his army beaten", quote from Sándor Petőfi's poem A vén zászlótartó.

Jelačić's portrait was depicted on the obverse of the Croatian 20 kuna banknote, issued in 1993 and 2001.

In 2008, a total of 211 streets in Croatia were named after Josip Jelačić, making him the fourth most common person eponym of streets in the country.

== Marriage and issue ==
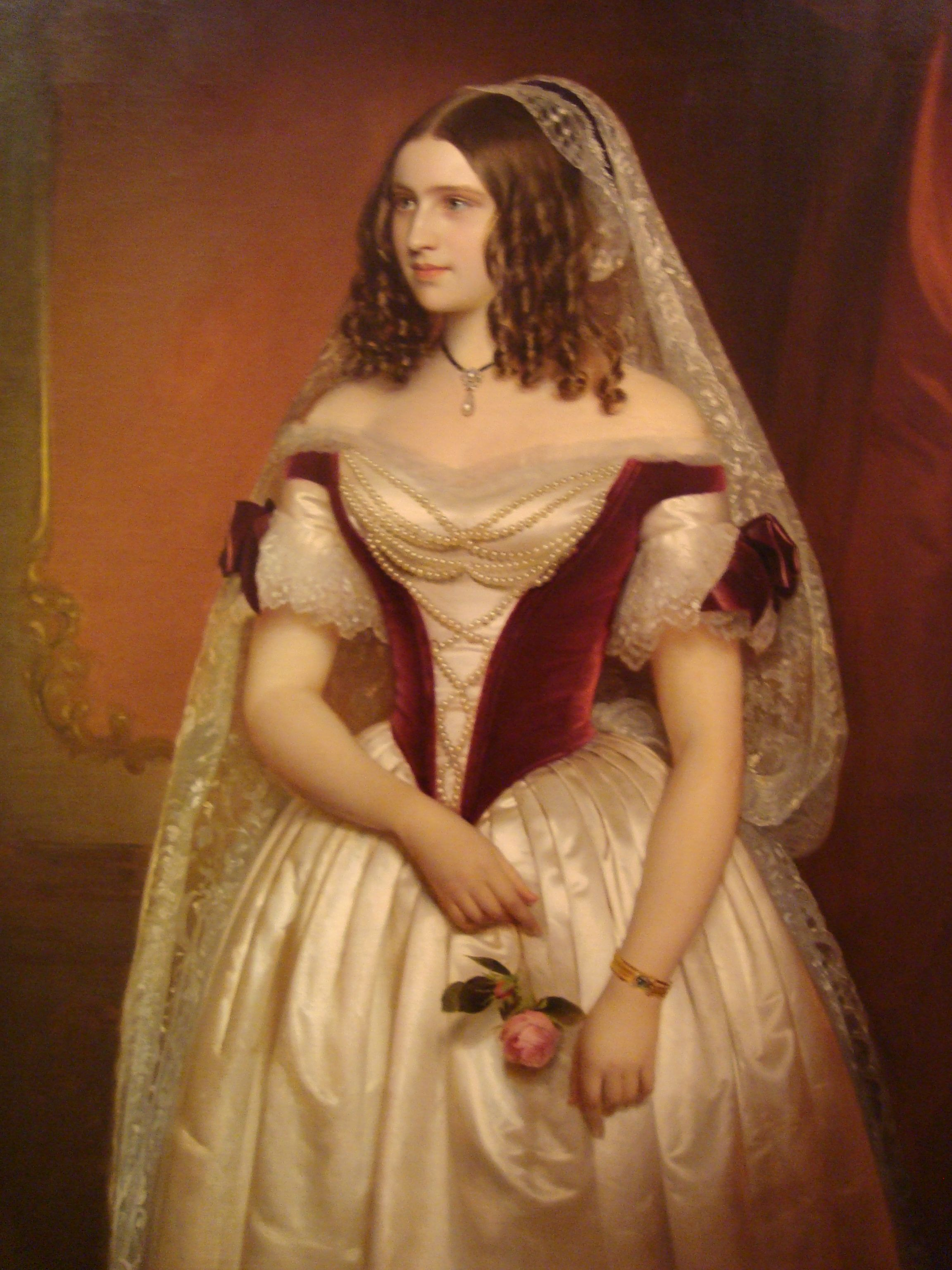
Countess Sophie von Stockau

In 1850, in Napajedla, he married young Countess Sophie von Stockau (1834–1877), daughter of Count Georg Adolf von Stockau (1806–1865) and his wife, Countess Franziska von Fünfkirchen (1801–1870). Her father was an illegitimate son of Duchess Therese of Mecklenburg-Strelitz and her lover, Count Maximilian von Lerchenfeld-Köfering-Schönberg (1772–1809), which made him related to almost all European reigning families. Josip and Sophie had one daughter:

- Countess Anna Josipa Franziska Seraphina Jelačić of Bužim (20 December 1854 - 9 September 1855); died of cholera

After becoming a widow, Sophie married on 16 May 1863 Count Adolf Dubsky von Trzebomislitz (1833–1911). Together, they had one daughter, Countess Maria Kinsky von Wchinitz und Tettau (1864–1926).

== Titles and honours ==
- Granted the title of Count, 24 April 1854 (as Jelačić von Bužim)

=== Orders and decorations ===
- Austrian Empire:
  - Commander of the Military Order of Maria Theresa, 1849
  - Grand Cross of the Imperial Order of Leopold
  - Military Merit Cross
- Duchy of Parma: Senator Grand Cross of the Constantinian Order of St. George
- Kingdom of Hanover: Grand Cross of the Royal Guelphic Order, 1849
- Holy See: Grand Cross of St. Gregory the Great
- Kingdom of Saxony:
  - Commander of the Order of Merit, 2nd Class, 1845
  - Grand Cross of the Military Order of St. Henry, 1849
- Russian Empire:
  - Knight of St. Alexander Nevsky
  - Knight of St. Vladimir, 1st Class
  - Knight of St. Anna, 1st Class
  - Knight of the White Eagle

== Bibliography ==
- Čuvalo, Ante (2008). "Josip Jelačić - Ban of Croatia" (PDF). Review of Croatian History. IV (1). Croatian Institute of History: 13–27.
- Nobili, Johann. Hungary 1848: The Winter Campaign. Edited and translated Christopher Pringle. Warwick, UK: Helion & Company Ltd., 2021.
- Švoger, Vlasta (2013). "Ban Josip Jelačić u očima svojih suvremenika" [Ban Josip Jelačić as Seen through the Eyes of His Contemporaries] (PDF). Zbornik Odsjeka za povijesne znanosti Zavoda za povijesne i društvene znanosti Hrvatske akademije znanosti i umjetnosti (in Croatian). 31. Croatian Academy of Sciences and Arts: 247–271.

| Preceded by Juraj Haulik | Ban of Croatia; 1848–1859 | Succeeded by Johann Coronini-Cronberg |
| Preceded by Matija Rukavina | Governor of the Kingdom of Dalmatia; 1848–1858 | Succeeded by Lazar Mamula |
